= HMS Hardy (1856) =

Gunboat of the Royal Navy

History

United Kingdom
- Name: HMS Hardy
- Ordered: 8 October 1855
- Builder: Charles Hill & Sons, Bristol
- Cost: £12,424
- Laid down: 20 October 1855
- Launched: 1 March 1856
- Commissioned: 7 March 1856
- Decommissioned: 31 March 1867
- Fate: Sold at Hong Kong on 9 February 1869

General characteristics
- Class & type: Albacore-class gunboat
- Tons burthen: 232 68/94 tons bm
- Length: 106 ft (32 m) (gundeck); 93 ft 2.5 in (28.410 m) (keel)
- Beam: 22 ft 0 in (6.71 m)
- Draught: 6 ft 6 in (1.98 m)
- Installed power: 60 nominal horsepower; 270 ihp (200 kW))
- Propulsion: 2-cylinder horizontal single expansion steam engine; Single screw
- Complement: 36–40
- Armament: 1 × 68-pounder (95cwt) MLSB gun; 1 × 32-pounder MLSB gun; 2 × 24-pounder howitzers

HMS Hardy was a Albacore-class gunboat of the Royal Navy, notable for her action during the British involvement in the Taiping Rebellion.

== Design ==
The Albacore-class was almost identical to the preceding Dapper class. Hardy measured 106 feet (32 m) in length at the gundeck and 93 feet 2 1/2 inches (28.410 m) at the keel. They were 22 feet (6.7 m) in beam, 8 feet (2.4 m) deep in the hold and had a draught of 6 feet 6 inches (1.98 m). Their displacement was 284 tons and they measured 23268/94 tons Builder's Old Measurement. The Albacore-class carried a crew of 36-40 men.

She had a two-cylinder horizontal single-expansion direct-acting steam engine, built by Maudslay, Sons and Field, with three boilers, providing 60 nominal horsepower through a single screw, sufficient for 7.5 knots (13.9 km/h; 8.6 mph).

She was armed with one 68-pounder (95 cwt) muzzle-loading smoothbore gun, one 32-pounder muzzle-loading smoothbore gun and two 24-pounder howitzers.

== Service ==
Hardy was commissioned under Lieut. William Leyland Wilson on 7 March 1856, though Wilson died three months later. Thus in July she was paid off at Portsmouth and joined the Steam Reserve.

On 20 September 1859, she was put under the command of Lieut. Archibald George Bogle and began serving in the East Indies and China. Under Bogle's command, Hardy saw action during the British involvement in the Taiping Rebellion. By November, Hardy was stationed in Imperialist-controlled Ningbo, and was present when Taiping forces attacked Ningbo. Arthur Moule, an English missionary, claimed he saw Hardy brandishing her "72-pounder pivot gun" (though the main gun of her class was recorded to be a 68-pounder) in an attempt to halt the Taiping advance but ultimately did not fire. She eventually took part in the recapturing of Ningbo on 10 May 1862, capturing a Chinese flag thought to have belonged to Taiping general Chen Yucheng. The flag is now held at the National Maritime Museum.

On 31 July 1862, Hardy and Confucius assisted the French-led Ever-Triumphant Army in the capture of Yuyao. The ships were also present during the Battle of Cixi on 20 September. Frederick Townsend Ward, commander of the Ever Victorious Army, was fatally wounded by a shot in the early morning of 21 September. He was removed to Hardy, where a surgeon from Encounter operated on Ward and extracted the ball, though Ward ultimately died on 22 September after he had been further removed to Ningbo.

On 2 February 1863, command was transferred to Lieut. Henry John Fletcher Campbell. On 14 April 1864, command was once again transferred to Lieut. George Morice. She was paid off on 31 March 1867 and sold at Hong Kong on 9 February 1869.
