= Edward Seymour (Royal Navy officer) =

British admiral (1840–1929)

Admiral of the Fleet The Right Honourable Sir Edward Seymour GCB OM GCVO
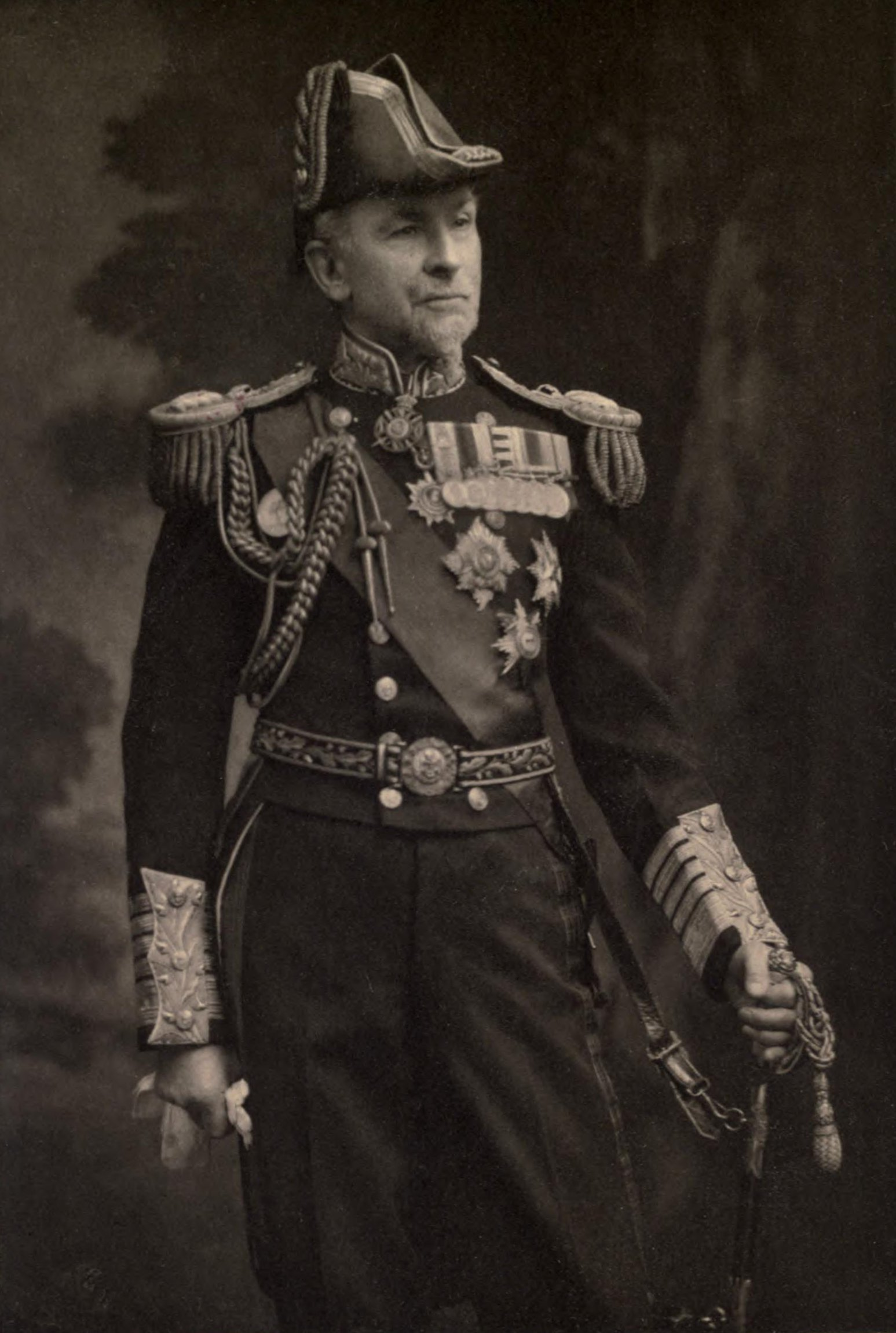
- Sir Edward Seymour
- Born: 30 April 1840; Kinwarton, Warwickshire
- Died: 2 March 1929 (aged 88); Maidenhead, Berkshire
- Military career
- Allegiance: United Kingdom
- Branch: Royal Navy
- Service years: 1852–1910
- Rank: Admiral of the Fleet
- Commands: China Station; SS Oregon; HMS Inflexible; HMS Iris; HMS Orontes; HMS Vigilant; HMS Growler; HMS Waterman
- Conflicts: Crimean War; Second Opium War; Taiping Rebellion; Boxer Rebellion
- Awards: Knight Grand Cross of the Order of the Bath; Member of the Order of Merit; Knight Grand Cross of the Royal Victorian Order

Admiral of the Fleet Sir Edward Hobart Seymour, GCB, OM, GCVO, PC (30 April 1840 – 2 March 1929) was a Royal Navy officer. As a junior officer he served in the Black Sea during the Crimean War. He then took part in the sinking of war junks, the Battle of Canton and the Battle of Taku Forts during the Second Opium War and then saw action again at the Battle of Cixi during the Taiping Rebellion.

Seymour went on to be Second-in-Command of the Channel Squadron and then Admiral Superintendent of Naval Reserves. After that he became Commander-in-Chief, China Station. During the Boxer Rebellion, he led an expedition of 2,000 sailors and marines from Western and Japanese warships to relieve the besieged diplomatic legations in Peking. The expedition was defeated by Chinese and Boxer forces and had to return to Tianjin. Although the mission had failed, when Seymour arrived back at Portsmouth he and his men were welcomed by thousands of people lining the beach and pier.

== Early career ==
Born the son of the Reverend Richard Seymour and Frances Seymour (née Smith), Seymour was educated at Radley College and Eastman's Royal Naval Academy, Southsea and joined the Royal Navy at Portsmouth in 1852. He was appointed to the corvette HMS Encounter and, having been promoted to midshipman, then transferred to the paddle frigate HMS Terrible in 1853. He served in HMS Terrible in the Black Sea throughout the Crimean War. He was appointed to the second-rate HMS Calcutta, flagship of his uncle Sir Michael Seymour, Commander-in-Chief, China Station in 1857 and took part in the sinking of the war-junks in June 1857, the Battle of Canton in December 1857 and the Battle of Taku Forts in May 1858 during the Second Opium War.

Seymour returned to Portsmouth and joined the steam frigate HMS Mersey after which he attended the training ship HMS Illustrious and then the gunnery school HMS Excellent. Promoted to sub-lieutenant on 4 May 1859, he returned to China and, during the voyage, was awarded the Royal Humane Society medal for an unsuccessful attempt to save a marine who had fallen overboard. Promoted to lieutenant on 11 February 1860, he joined the frigate HMS Chesapeake, flagship of the Commander-in-Chief, China Station, and saw action again at the Battle of Taku Forts in August 1860. He became commanding officer of the paddle steamer HMS Waterman at Canton and then transferred to the paddle sloop HMS Sphynx before joining the frigate HMS Imperieuse, the new flagship of the Commander-in-Chief, China Station, and took part in the Battle of Cixi in September 1862 during the Taiping Rebellion.

Seymour became flag lieutenant to the Commander-in-Chief, Portsmouth in 1863 and then joined the Royal Yacht HMY Victoria and Albert in 1865. Promoted to commander on 5 March 1866, after a tour in a whaling ship to obtain experience of arctic waters, he joined the Coast Guard in Ireland in 1868 and then became commanding officer of the gunboat HMS Growler on the West Coast of Africa Station in June 1869. After taking part in operations against African pirates in 1870, he became commanding officer of the despatch vessel HMS Vigilant in the Channel Squadron in January 1872 and then of the despatch vessel HMS Lively later that year, also in the Channel Squadron.

Promoted to captain on 13 March 1873, Seymour spent a year at the Royal Naval College, Greenwich and then became commanding officer of the troopship HMS Orontes. He went on to be commanding officer of the cruiser HMS Iris in the Mediterranean Fleet in April 1880 and commanding officer of the battleship HMS Inflexible in the Mediterranean Fleet in November 1882. He briefly commanded the converted liner SS Oregon when Russian forces seized Afghan territory in March 1885 during the Panjdeh Incident. He went on to be flag captain to the Commander-in-Chief, Portsmouth in May 1886 and, having been appointed a Companion of the Order of the Bath on 21 June 1887, he became assistant to the Admiral Superintendent of Naval Reserves in December 1887.

Promoted to rear-admiral on 14 July 1889, Seymour became Second-in-Command of the Channel Squadron, with his flag in the battleship HMS Anson, in April 1894. Promoted to vice-admiral on 9 November 1895, he became Admiral Superintendent of Naval Reserves later that year. He was advanced to Knight Commander of the Order of the Bath on 22 June 1897.

== Commander-in-Chief, China Station ==
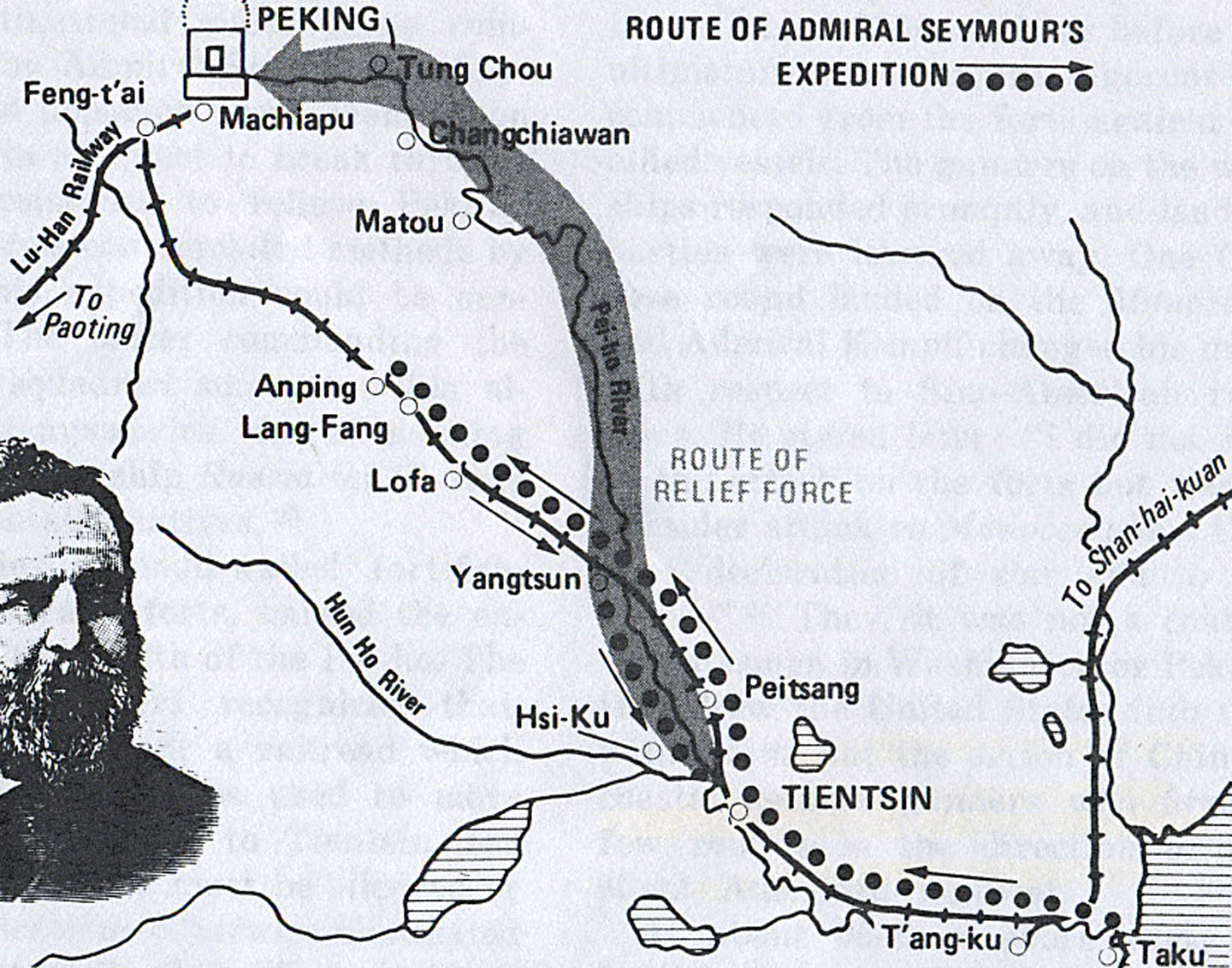
The route of Seymour's Expedition is shown on this map

=== Boxer Rebellion ===
Seymour became Commander-in-Chief, China Station, with his flag in the battleship HMS Centurion, on 18 February 1898. In early 1900 the Boxers, a rural mass movement, decided to rid China of Western influence and in June 1900 they advanced on Peking, initiating the Boxer Rebellion. The diplomatic legations in Peking requested military support. On 9 June 1900 Sir Claude MacDonald the British Minister cabled Seymour, reporting that the situation in Beijing "was hourly becoming more serious" and that "troops should be landed and all arrangements made for an advance to Peking at once." In response Seymour assembled a lightly armed force of 2,000 sailors and marines from Western and Japanese warships in Tianjin. The expedition headed for Beijing by train. Seymour's force consisted of 916 British, 455 Germans, 326 Russians, 158 French, 112 Americans, 54 Japanese, 41 Italians, and 26 Austrians.

On the first day the allied force travelled twenty five miles without incident, crossing a bridge at Yancun over the Hai River unopposed although Chinese General Nie Shicheng and thousands of his soldiers were camped there. The next few days went slowly as Seymour had to repair railroad track and fight off Boxer attacks as his trains advanced. On 14 June 1900, several hundred Boxers armed with swords, spears, and clumsy gingals attacked Seymour twice and killed five Italian sailors who had been acting as pickets. The Americans counted 102 Boxer bodies left on the battlefield at the end of one battle.

On 16 June 1900 there was an allied European and Japanese attack on the Dagu Forts. As a result of the attack in Dagu, the Chinese government decided to resist Seymour's expedition and kill or expel all foreigners in northern China. So, on 18 June 1900, Seymour's force was suddenly attacked by several thousand well-armed Chinese Imperial soldiers – who had not opposed Seymour's passage a few days earlier. The expedition fought off the attack, reportedly killing hundreds of Chinese at a loss of seven dead and 57 wounded. However, the need to care for the wounded, a shortage of supplies and ammunition, and the likelihood of additional Chinese attacks forced Seymour and his officers to decide on a retreat to Tianjin.

=== Retreat ===
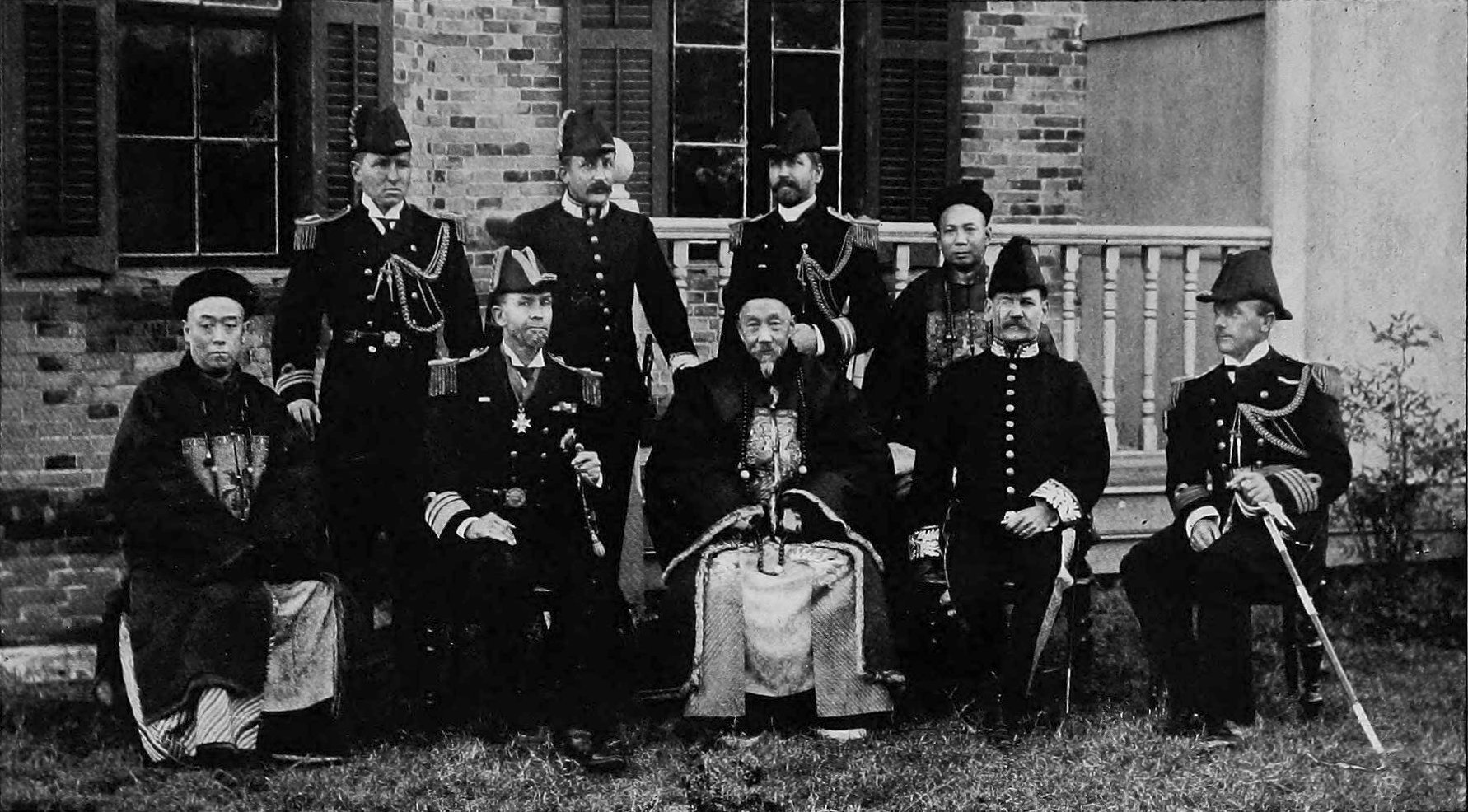
Seymour (third from left) with Li Hongzhang, the Qing dynasty's main negotiator during the Boxer Rebellion, 1900

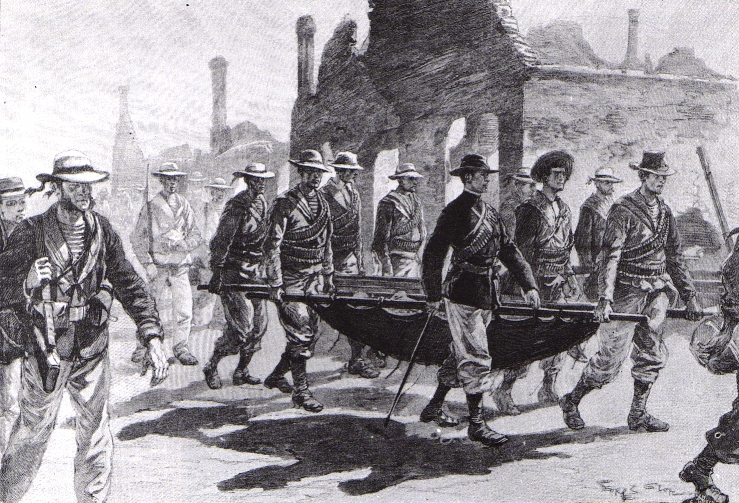
Seymour's battered force arrives back in Tianjin

Seymour turned his trains around and headed back toward Tianjin. But, he found the bridge across the Hai River he had crossed a few days before now destroyed by the Boxers or the Chinese army. The sailors, perhaps more comfortable near water, chose to follow the river – although the railroad route was shorter and ran through open country. Along the heavily populated river banks were Boxer-infested villages every one-half mile. Seymour's retreat down the Hai River was slow and difficult, covering only three miles the first day. Additional casualties included John Jellicoe who suffered a near fatal wound. By 22 June 1900, the allies were out of food and down to less than 10 rounds of ammunition per man – except for the Americans who had brought ample ammunition. But, "there was no thought of surrender," said Lieutenant Wurtzbaugh. "The intention was to fight to the last with the bayonet." On 23 June 1900, six miles from Tianjin, Seymour came across the Xigu fort and arsenal which inexplicably was nearly undefended by Chinese soldiers. The foreign sailors and marines took refuge in the arsenal which contained a wealth of arms and ammunition and some food. Realizing its mistake in leaving the arsenal undefended, the Chinese army attempted to dislodge Seymour, now well-armed, but were unsuccessful.

A Chinese servant of the British slipped through to Tianjin and requested rescue for Seymour. Two thousand allied soldiers marched out of the city to the arsenal on 25 June 1900 and the next day escorted Seymour's men back to Tianjin. The Chinese did not oppose their passage. A missionary reported their arrival in Tianjin. "I shall never forget to my dying day, the long string of dusty travel-worn soldiers, who for a fortnight had been living on quarter rations, and fighting every day…the men were met by kind ladies with pails of tea which the poor fellows drunk as they had never drunk before – some bursting into tears." Seymour's casualties were 62 dead and 232 wounded.

== Later career ==
Promoted to full admiral on 24 May 1901, Seymour arrived back at Portsmouth where he was welcomed by thousands of people lining the beach and pier and honoured by a visit by the Lords of the Admiralty to his flagship. He had been advanced to Knight Grand Cross of the Order of the Bath (GCB) on 9 November 1900; in late September 1901 he was received in a personal audience by King Edward VII, who presented him with the insignia of the order. He was also awarded the Prussian Order of the Red Eagle, First class, with the crossed swords in April 1902.

In May 1902, he was part of a delegation led by the Duke of Connaught to take part in the enthronement ceremonies in Madrid for the young King Alfonso XIII of Spain, and he was awarded the Spanish Crosses of Naval Merit.

Seymour was among the original recipients of the Order of Merit (OM) in the 1902 Coronation Honours list published on 26 June 1902, and received the order from King Edward VII at Buckingham Palace on 8 August 1902. He was also appointed First and Principal Naval Aide-de-Camp to the King on 3 October 1902.

Promoted to Admiral of the Fleet on 20 February 1905 and appointed a Knight Grand Cross of the Royal Victorian Order on 15 May 1906, Seymour became commander of a squadron, with his flag in the battlecruiser HMS Inflexible, sent to attend celebrations in Boston in 1909. In November 1909 he was sworn in the Privy Council. He retired from the Navy in April 1910 and died at his home in Maidenhead on 2 March 1929.

== Family ==
Seymour neither married nor had any children.

== Sources ==
- Bacon, Admiral R. H. (1936). The Life of John Rushworth, Lord Jellicoe. London: Cassell.
- Bigham, Charles Clive (1901). A Year in China. London: Macmilian.
- Davids, Jules (1981). American Diplomatic and State Papers: The United States and China: Boxer Uprising, Series 3, Vol. 5. Wilmington, DE: Scholarly Resources.
- Fleming, Peter (1959). The Siege of Peking. New York: Harper. ISBN 978-0195837353.
- Heathcote, Tony (2002). The British Admirals of the Fleet 1734 – 1995. Pen & Sword Ltd. ISBN 0-85052-835-6.
- Thompson, Larry Clinton (2009). William Scott Ament and the Boxer Rebellion: Heroism, Hubris, and the Ideal Missionary. Jefferson, NC: McFarland. ISBN 978-0786440085.
- Wurtzbaugh, Lt. Daniel W. (June 1902). The Seymour Relief Expedition. U.S. Naval Institute.

Military offices
| Preceded by Sir Alexander Buller | Commander-in-Chief, China Station; 1897–1901 | Succeeded by Sir Cyprian Bridge |
| Preceded by new post | Military Commissioner of Weihaiwei; 1898–1899 | Succeeded by Arthur Robert Ford Dorward |
Honorary titles
| Preceded by Sir James Erskine | First and Principal Naval Aide-de-Camp; 1902–1903 | Succeeded by Sir Henry Stephenson |
