= Kajow =

Steamer

History
- Name: Kajow
- Namesake: Kiao-Chiao (modern day Gaoqiao)
- Fate: Sunk on 12 October 1863; Later refloated, further fate unknown

General characteristics
- Class & type: Armed steamer
- Armament: 1 × 12-pounder howitzer

Kajow (simplified Chinese: 高桥; traditional Chinese: 高橋; pinyin: Gāoqiáo; Wade–Giles: Kao Ch'iao) was a small armed steamer that served with the Imperialist forces during the Taiping Rebellion. It was briefly seized by Taiping forces but was later recaptured by the Imperialists.

== History ==
Kajow was in the service of the local futai, and was frequently used by the Scottish diplomat Halliday Macartney for trips between Sunkiang(now Songjiang) and Shanghai. It was commanded by an American named C. F. Jones, who reportedly became dissatisfied with the Chinese authorities after his employers withheld his pay for nearly a year. Jones eventually left Chinese service and was persuaded by his acquaintance, Henry Andres Burgevine, an American serving the Taiping Heavenly Kingdom—to assist in capturing Kajow.

In August 1863, Macartney, departing from Shanghai, arrived at Sunkiang on Kajow. Shanghai, arrived at Sunkiang on Kajow. On the morning of 2 August 1863, Burgevine and Jones, together with a group of forty European and Chinese men, captured Kajow. At the time of its capture, Kajow was carrying "valuable cargo of arms and ammunition". Kajow was then taken to Suzhou. It was later moved to Nanjing where her engines were repaired.

On 1 October, it took part in an unsuccessful attempt to capture Patachiaou. In the following weeks, Burgevine and Jones negotiated with Charles George Gordon, commander of the Imperial Ever Victorious Army, for the surrender of their men and Kajow, citing the fact that they received no pay during their service with the rebels. The plan was not yet carried out when, on 12 October, Taiping general Li Xiucheng launched an attack on Monding near Suzhou, against Gordon's forces. Kajow and Jones thus took to battle. At 10 a.m., Kajow was sunk at Tajouka (simplified Chinese: 大桥角; traditional Chinese: 大橋角), Wuxi by a "lucky shot" which ignited the magazine of the ship, and the Taiping attack was repelled. Burgevine and Jones surrendered to Gordon, and the wreck of Kajow was recovered by Imperialist forces. Her further fate is not known.
