= Battle of Tientsin =

Battle fought in Northern China in 1900

- Part of the Boxer Rebellion
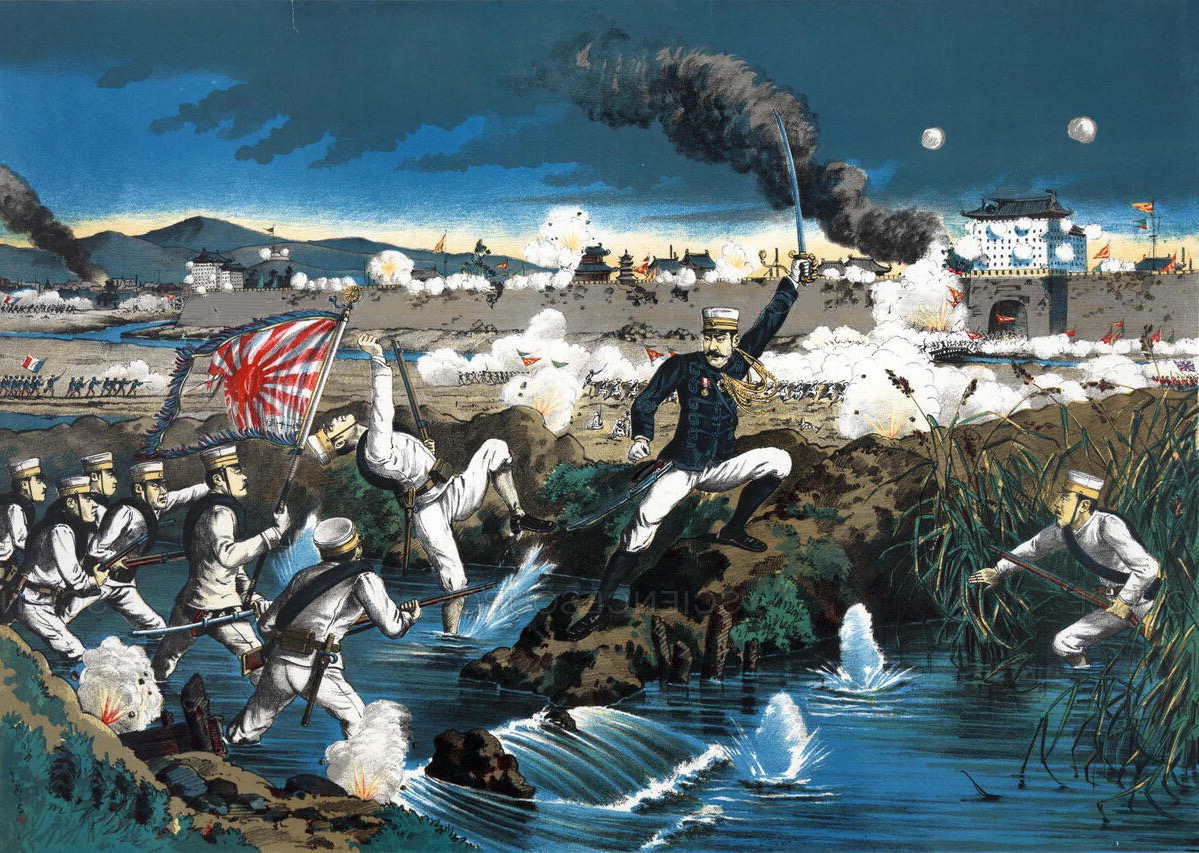
- Japanese soldiers capturing Tianjin
Date	14 July 1900
Location	Tianjin, China
Result	Allied victory

Belligerents
Eight-Nation Alliance British Empire Russia Japan France Germany United States Italy Austria-Hungary	Boxer movement; Qing dynasty

Commanders and leaders
(Russian Empire) Anatoly Stessel (WIA) (United Kingdom of Great Britain and Ireland) Edward Seymour (United Kingdom of Great Britain and Ireland) Arthur Dorward (French Third Republic) Charles de Pélacot (United States) Emerson Liscum † (United States) Austin R. Davis †	(Qing dynasty) Nie Shicheng † (Qing dynasty) Dong Fuxiang (Qing dynasty) Ronglu; Cao Futian; Lin Hei'er (POW)

Strength
6,900 Allied soldiers 20 field guns 4,933 cavalry	(Qing dynasty) 12,000 soldiers; 10,000 Tenacious Army; 2,000 Kansu Braves; Unknown number of Boxers, including many Red Lanterns

Casualties and losses
250 killed, 500 wounded: (Empire of Japan) 320 killed and wounded; (United States) 25 killed, 98 wounded; (United Kingdom of Great Britain and Ireland) 17 killed, 87 wounded; (French Third Republic) 13 killed, 90 wounded; (German Empire) and (Russian Empire) 140 killed and wounded	Unknown

Battle of Tientsin
- Traditional Chinese: 天津之戰
- Simplified Chinese: 天津之战
- Literal meaning: Battle of Tianjin
Transcriptions
Standard Mandarin
- Hanyu Pinyin: Tiānjīn zhī zhàn
- Wade–Giles: T'ien'chin chih chan

The Battle of Tientsin, or the Relief of Tientsin, occurred on 13–14 July 1900, during the Boxer Rebellion in Northern China. A multinational military force, representing the Eight-Nation Alliance, rescued a besieged population of foreign nationals in the city of Tianjin (Postal: Tientsin) by defeating the Chinese Imperial army and Boxers. The capture of Tianjin gave the Eight-Nation Alliance a base to launch a rescue mission for the foreign nationals besieged in the Legation Quarter of Beijing and to capture Beijing.

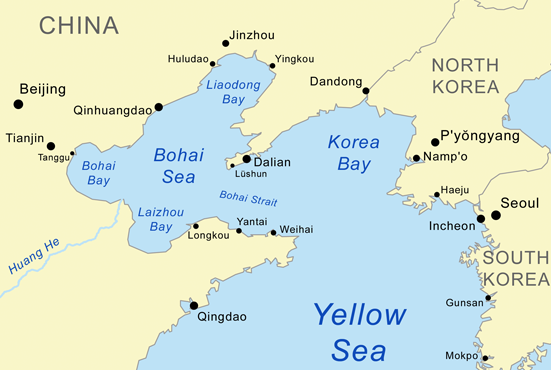
The region of Tianjin (then romanized as Tientsin) and Beijing (then romanized as Peking).

== Background ==
Tianjin, in 1900, consisted of two adjacent, but very different sub-divisions. To the northwest was the ancient high-walled Chinese city, one mile (1.6 km) on each side. To the southeast, one to two miles away (1.6 to 3.2 km), along the Hai River, was the treaty port and foreign settlements, a half-mile wide (0.8 km). About one million Chinese lived within the walled city or in satellite communities outside the wall. In the foreign settlements resided 700 foreign civilians, mostly European merchants and missionaries, along with tens of thousands of Chinese servants, employees, and businessmen. Among the civilians living in the foreign settlement were Herbert Hoover, a future president of the United States, and his wife Lou Henry Hoover. A low mud wall, less than 10 ft tall (3.0 m), surrounded at a distance of several hundred yards (half km) both the higher walls of the old city and the foreign settlements.

In early June 1900, in response to the growing threat of the Boxers (Militia United in Righteousness, Yihetuan), which was a militant, anti-foreign and anti-Christian peasant movement, six countries with interests in China sent 2,400 troops to Tianjin to guard the foreign settlements. Another 2,000 were with Admiral Seymour along the railway line between Tianjin and Beijing, attempting to march to Beijing to protect the foreign community there. The allied military force was composed of soldiers, sailors, and marines from Great Britain, the United States, Japan, France, Russia, Germany, Italy, and Austria-Hungary. With so many nationalities among the Allied force, no overall commander was appointed. Leadership was collective.

== Siege ==
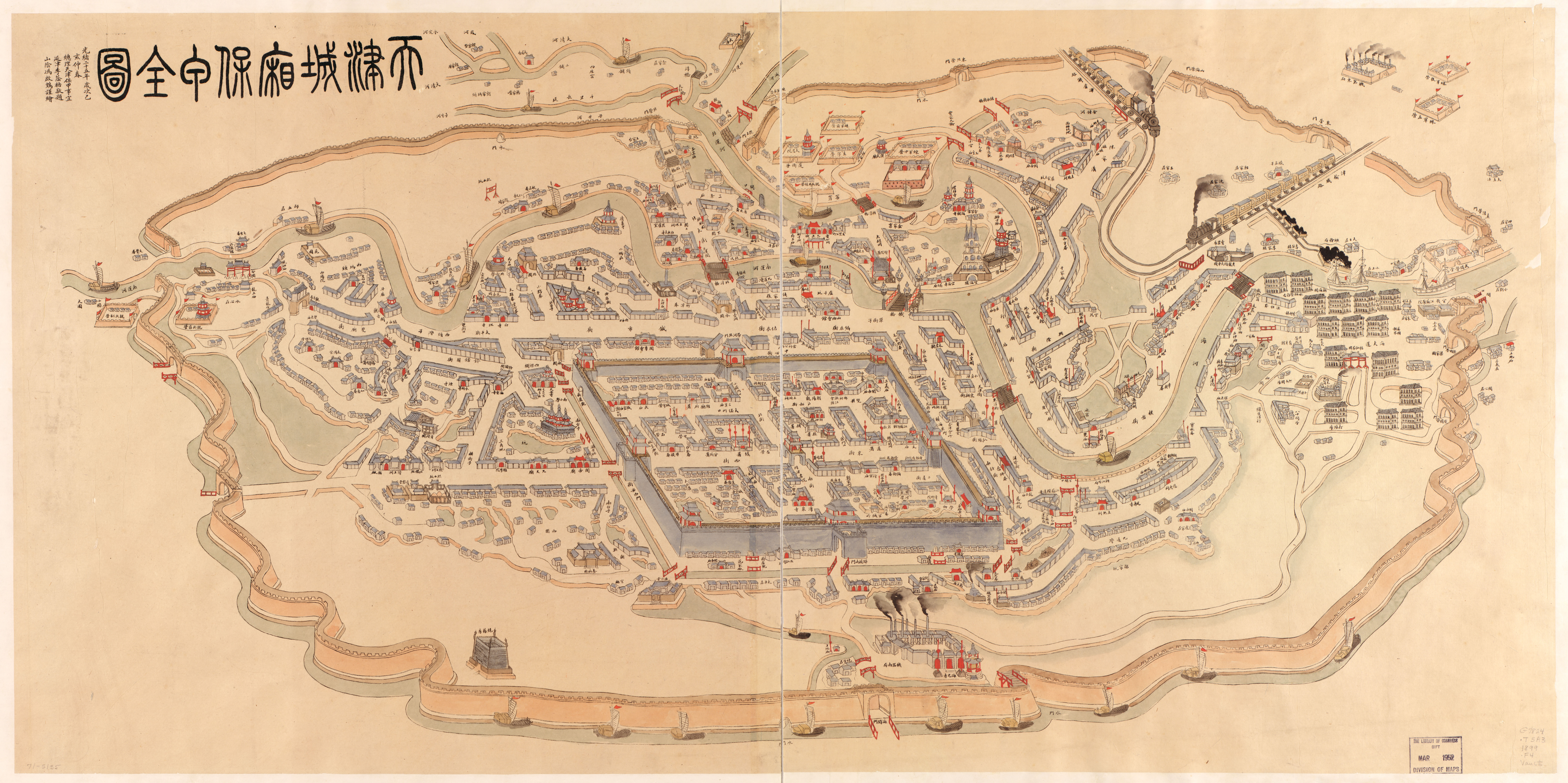
The walled (Chinese) city of Tianjin, at the center of this map, was one mile (1.6 km) square. The foreign concessions are shown on the far right, just inside the low mud wall that surrounds Tianjin and environs. The Americans, British, and Japanese attacked the walled city from the south; the Russians attacked it from the east.

Thousands of Boxers from the countryside converged upon Tianjin, and on 15 June 1900, they rampaged through the walled city destroying Christian churches and killing Chinese Christians. On 16 June, a mob of partially armed Boxers advanced on the foreign settlement. They were driven off by volleys of fire from the defenders. The Chinese army near Tianjin stood by and awaited orders from Beijing to either support the Boxers or protect the foreigners. As a result of the 17 June attack by the foreign armies on the Dagu Forts, the Qing government of China took the side of the Boxers and ordered the army to attack the foreign settlements. The Chinese began bombarding the foreign settlement with artillery on 17 June. The Western and Japanese soldiers defending the foreign settlements were initially stretched thin, and all communication with the coast and the allied fleet was cut off for several days.

The Chinese army numbered an estimated 15,000 in Tianjin plus Boxers armed with swords, spears, and antique guns, although the number of Boxer combatants was diminishing rapidly as the movement was fading back into the countryside from where it came. The army was led by general Nie Shicheng, who was considered one of the ablest Chinese officers. Most of the Chinese army action against the foreign settlements consisted of a daily artillery barrage. The army fired an estimated 60,000 artillery shells at the foreign settlements. However, most of the shells failed to explode on impact due to inefficiency and corruption in the Chinese ammunition factories and did less damage than might otherwise have been expected.

On 21 June 1900, some 131 US Marines and 400 Russians made a desperate attempt to reinforce Tianjin by following the railway from the coast to the city. Only two miles from the city they were ambushed by the Chinese and forced to retire, the Americans losing 3 killed and 13 wounded. Additional Western soldiers were unloaded from ships offshore and rushed up the railroad to Tianjin. Five thousand reinforcements reached Tianjin on 23 June to augment the hard-pressed soldiers and civilians defending the foreign settlements. Their arrival caused the Chinese to withdraw from their position on the east which enabled the besieged to establish a tenuous line of communication and supply along the railroad to the coast, 30 miles (48 km) away. The Chinese army continued to besiege three sides of the Tianjin foreign settlements. On 26 June, a force of 2,000 sallied from the settlements and rescued Admiral Seymour and his 2,000 men who were surrounded six miles (10 km) out of the city. With Seymour's men they returned to the settlements without opposition. Most of Seymour's force of sailors returned to their ships. Reinforced, and with their supply line to the coast secured, the coalition of allied soldiers in the foreign settlement began planning an assault on the walled city of Tianjin to defeat the Chinese army and open the road to Beijing and the relief of the Siege of the International Legations.

Nie Shicheng and Ma Yukun commanded the forces against the Alliance, raining precise and intense ordnance against the Tianjin concessions. The losses suffered by the Alliance in battle was mainly due to artillery bombardment since the Chinese army carried it out with extreme precision and in a superb manner. They hid well, employed good bulwarks of defense by using the landscape and went on the offensive in a dauntless manner and would continue battling until the end. The Chinese artillery fire was so accurate that the besieged westerners falsely believed rumours that it was Russian artillery instructors who were being forced to fire the artillery after being kidnapped at bayonet point.

== Battle ==
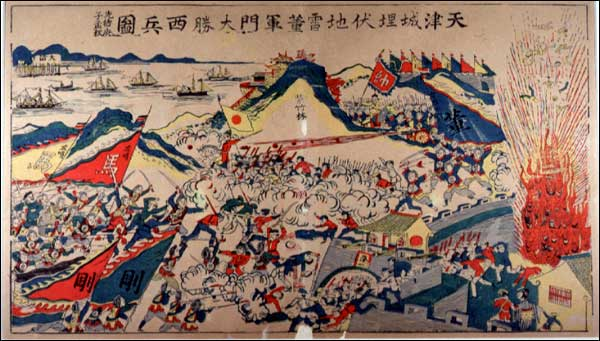
Anonymous Chinese woodblock. Bodies thrown into the sky as Dong Fuxiang's Muslim troops attack Western forces at Tianjin.

The allies had underestimated the capability of the Chinese forces at the beginning of the siege, thinking that foreign troops could easily brush aside Chinese forces. They turned out to be wrong, in the face of fierce Chinese resistance. On 13 July 1900, the allied force to assault the walled city of Tianjin consisted of about 6,900 soldiers: 2,500 Russians, 2,000 Japanese, 900 Americans, 800 British, 600 French, and 100 Germans and Austrians. The challenge was substantial. The walls of Tianjin were 20 ft (6.1 m) high and 16 ft (4.9 m) thick. The Chinese had about 12,000 soldiers within the city or in nearby forts. They were well-armed with artillery, machine guns, and modern rifles. To reach the city wall, the allied troops would have to cross more than a mile (2 km) of flat, unwooded terrain, dotted with farmhouses and swamps and crossed by canals and causeways. An American soldier surveying the scene said that "had a formidable enemy defended the Chinese position the attacking column would have been annihilated."

The plan of the allies was to storm the city on two sides: British, American, Japanese and French troops would attack the South Gate; Russian and German troops would attack the East Gate. Herbert Hoover, who was based in the city as a mining engineer, agreed to guide the Allied forces through the local terrain. Early in the morning of 13 July 1900, Hoover with the US Marines guided the three columns of British, American, Japanese and French troops to the approaches to the South Gate. When the lead troops came under fire, Hoover was permitted to withdraw from the action and return to Tianjin where the civilian population was waiting to be evacuated to the Taku (Dagu) Forts. However, Hoover and his wife, Lou Henry Hoover, remained in Tianjin to care for the wounded.

The attack went poorly for the Allies in large part due to the lack of overall command. Miscommunication and uncoordinated movements plagued the attackers. The main effort against the South Gate became pinned down in an exposed position under Chinese fire from within the city. The Chinese again unleashed a torrent of fire upon the Allies. The allied troops were forced to lie face down in mud. The uniform of the American troops, dark blue, provided a virtual bull's eye to the Chinese troops, equipped with western firearms, such as Winchesters, Mausers, Mannlichers. Severe losses were inflicted on the Allies. Captain David Beatty noted the British forces took cover in an entirely exposed location. Similarly, the 9th U.S. Infantry Regiment was exposed to fire from Chinese sharpshooters as it attacked from the left, right across open ground. The regiment's commander, Colonel Emerson H. Liscum, was fatally shot as he rushed to take the flags after the regiment's standard-bearer fell. His dying words were, "Keep up the fire, men!" The allied troops were held down in the mud by the constant Chinese fire. Herbert Hoover led American Marines to assist the Royal Welsh Fusiliers, and they hit a swamp where Chinese guns murderously targeted them. The Chinese kept the guns firing for over five hours, until nightfall. Bullets were described as "hail", and guns provided a "death tattoo".

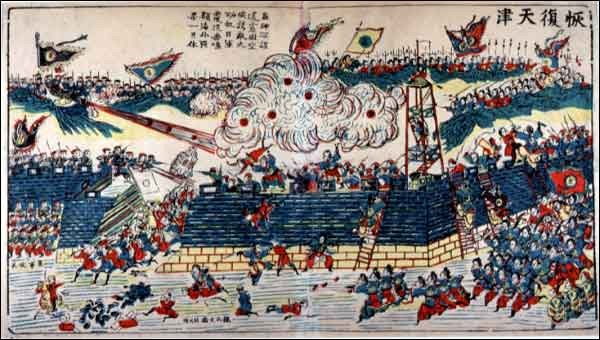
In this nianhua, created by an anonymous artist who did not view the event, there is a depiction of the Boxers bombarding Tianjin in June 1900, and Dong Fuxiang's Muslim troops attacking the expeditionary force led by Royal Navy admiral Seymour.

The Japanese General Fukushima Yasumasa, who had fought against the Chinese previously, warned Allied commander Dorwood that Chinese forces would fight to the death if trapped, but if they left an escape route of two gates open, the Chinese would retreat.

Eventually the attacks were called off. The Japanese soldiers attempted to blast away the South Gate but the defenders continued to simply cut or extinguish the fuses. At 3:00 am the following morning the Japanese finally succeeded. A soldier volunteered to brave the enemy fire and light a short fuse. The soldier was killed in the explosion but succeeded in breaching the gate. Japanese soldiers charged through the open gate and entered the city, followed by the British and American soldiers. The Russians renewed their attack on the East Gate and broke through, causing the remaining Imperial Chinese soldiers to withdraw from the city. Once inside the city the Allied soldiers became disorganized and some engaged in looting.

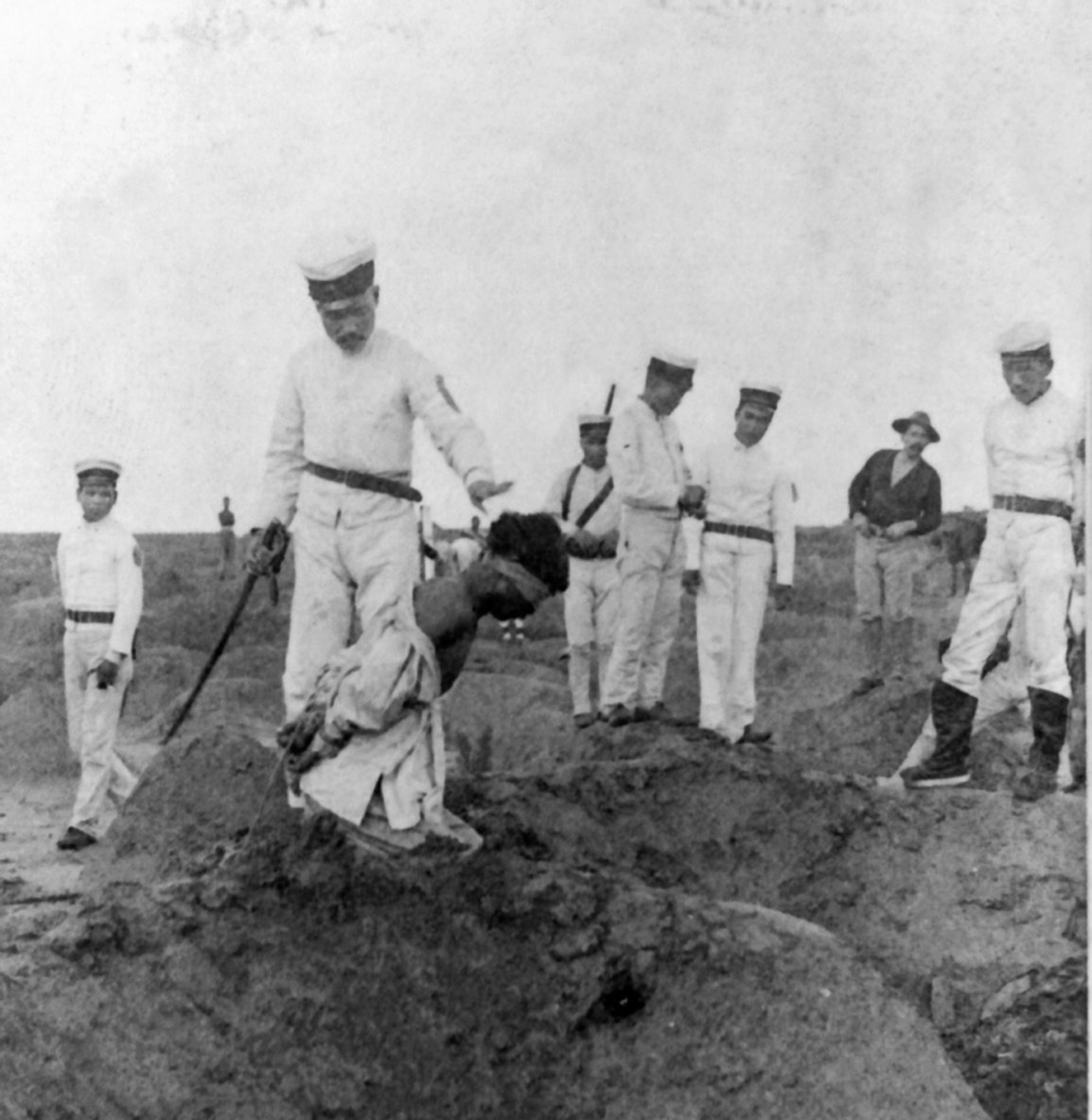
The Japanese executed suspected Boxers by beheading them.

After General Nie was killed and Generals Ma and Song retreated, only Dong Fuxiang remained with his Muslim troops to combat the advancing forces of the Eight-Nation Alliance from Tianjin to Beijing.

== Casualties ==
For the Eight-Nation Alliance, Tientsin was the bloodiest battle of the Boxer Rebellion. Two hundred and fifty soldiers of the allied armies were killed and about 500 wounded. The Japanese lost 320 killed and wounded; the Russians and Germans 140 killed and wounded; the Americans 25 killed, and 98 wounded; the British, 17 killed and 87 wounded; and the French 13 killed and 50 wounded. Casualties for the Chinese Army and the Boxers are unknown.

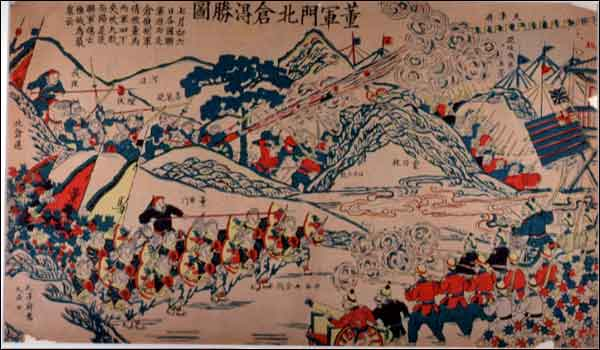
Dong Fuxiang's Muslim troops fighting Allied forces at Beicang outside of Tianjin

== Aftermath ==
After the victory at Tientsin, the foreign soldiers decided that the advance on Beijing should be delayed until sufficient forces were collected. This was largely on account of the changed opinions regarding Chinese valor and the effectiveness of their resistance to the Seymour expedition. As it was, the Allies would have tarried at Tianjin for additional reinforcements some weeks longer had not the British and American commanders threatened to proceed alone with their contingents and risk the consequences. Although it was felt, so had the estimation of Chinese prowess been increased, that at least 50,000 troops were necessary, some thought 70,000, successfully to invade the interior, the second relief expedition to Beijing finally got under way, 4 August, with 18,800 men. This number included 8,000 Japanese, 3,000 British, 4,500 Russians, 2,500 Americans, and 800 French. The Germans were unrepresented, as it was judged best to reserve some strength for Kiaochau and the coast, in case of trouble there.

== Monument ==
In the Nankai District of Tianjin in present-day China, a "Nie Shicheng Martyrs Monument" is in the area, to General Nie Shicheng who died in battle at the Battle of Tientsin.

== See also ==
- Military history of the Qing dynasty
- Military history of China
