= Austin R. Davis =

American captain (1871–1900)

Austin Rockwell Davis
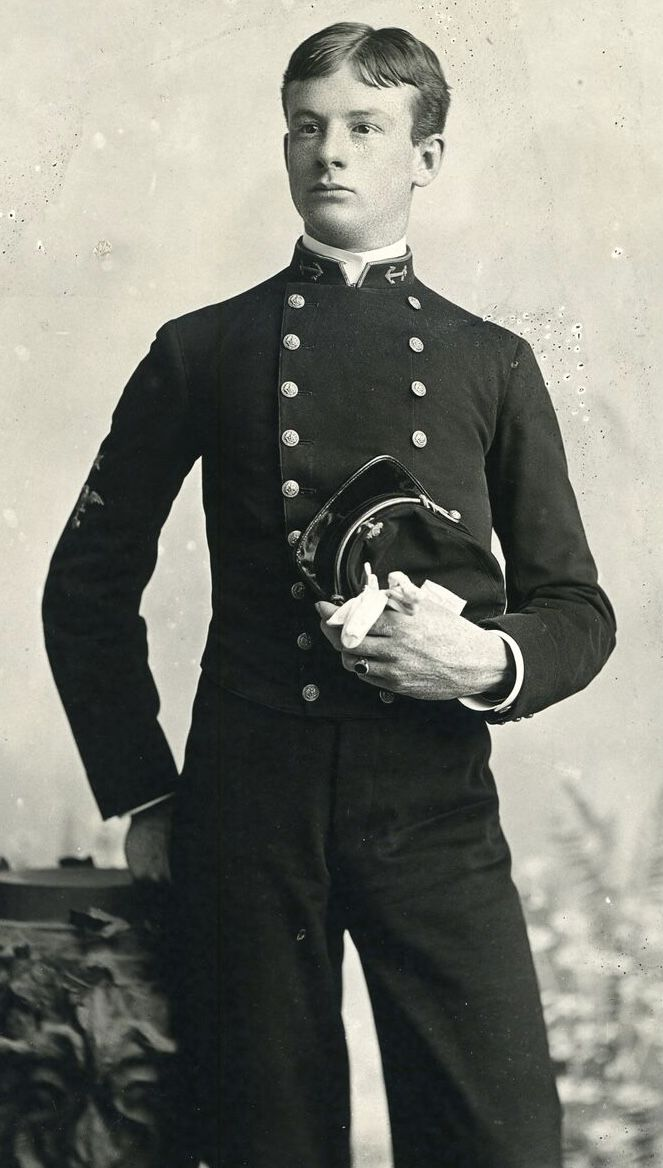
- Born: July 31, 1871; Atlanta, Georgia, U.S.
- Died: July 13, 1900 (aged 28); Tianjin, China
- Burial place: Arlington National Cemetery, Arlington, Virginia, U.S.
- Education: United States Naval Academy
- Military career
- Allegiance: United States
- Branch: U.S. Marine Corps
- Service years: 1887–1900
- Rank: Captain
- Conflicts: Spanish-American War: Battle of Santiago de Cuba; Filipino-American War; Boxer Rebellion: Battle of Tientsin †

Austin Rockwell Davis (July 31, 1871 – July 13, 1900) was an American captain who served in the United States Marine Corps. He was known for his role in commanding the American relief force during the Boxer Rebellion before being killed during the Battle of Tientsin.

== Military career ==
Davis was born on July 31, 1871, at Atlanta, Georgia as the son of Reverend Lucien Bonaparte and Caroline Matilda (née Clarke) Davis. He began his military career upon his successful registration to the United States Naval Academy in the fall of 1887. Despite resigning on February 6, 1888, he would resume his studies on 21 May that same year before graduating on 3 June 1892. During his tenure as a cadet, he served in the sloop-of-war USS Kearsarge before the ship was wrecked off the coast of Colombia at the Roncador Cay on 16 February 1894. Following his commission as a second lieutenant of the United States Marine Corps on 1 June 1894, he continued his studies at the Officer Candidates School where he graduated in June 1895. Prior to the outbreak of the Spanish-American War, Davis had been stationed within the USS Oregon within the docks of San Francisco on 15 July 1896. With the news of the sinking of the USS Maine on 15 February 1898, the USS Oregon began its long journey to the Caribbean beginning on 19 March across Cape Horn before joining the rest of the North Atlantic Squadron on 24 May at Jupiter, Florida where he also made a telegram to his worried mother. Davis participated in the destruction of the remaining Spanish ships that had been stationed across the Caribbean Sea beginning on 3 July with the ship's participation in the Battle of Santiago de Cuba. He was promoted to captain on 4 November that same year and a later promotion to captain on 3 March 1899.

Davis was then transferred to serve in the brewing Filipino-American War as he would arrive in Manila Bay on 3 March 1899 and organized a battalion to later serve in Company C of the 1st Marine Regiment, operating within the Cavite area. Plans were subsequently changed in the summer of 1900 as the failure of the Seymour Expedition saw the creation of the Gaselee Expedition with the goal of relieving the soldiers of the Eight-Nation Alliance against the Boxer Rebellion. For the upcoming Battle of Tientsin, he served as a commander of the 9th Infantry Regiment alongside fellow Americans and Spanish-American War veterans Emerson H. Liscum, George Richards and Littleton Waller. During the battle, whilst the American soldiers were advancing past the mud walls and onto the city itself, they began opening fire near a graveyard after encountering an impassable swamp and Chinese forces surrounding them on three sides. During this stage of the battle, Davis was out in the open and whilst smoking a cigarette, made orders to his men before being mortally struck in the face by a Chinese jingal at 8:30 in the morning. He later died from his wounds and was initially buried at the English Cemetery alongside Liscum who had also died that same day with a single wooden slab marking his name. A year later, Davis was successfully reinterred at the Arlington National Cemetery with a memorial held on 22 May that year.

With news of his death spreading quickly in his home city as the only Atlantan to die in the Boxer Rebellion, his family commissioned a posthumous portrait with Adelaide Chloe Everhart being chosen as the painter with the painting being dedicated in November 1902 in the newly built Carnegie library where his house once stood. As of 1988, the portrait resided in the house of his nephew Wingfield Davis following the portrait no longer being available for public viewing a few years prior.
