= Chinese steamer Confucius =

Chinese armed riverboat

Confucius
History
- Name: Confucius
- Owner: Thomas Hunt & Co.
- Out of service: 1855

Qing Empire
- Name: Confucius; Tien Ping
- Namesake: Confucius
- Acquired: 1855
- Fate: Unknown

General characteristics
- Class & type: Steamer
- Displacement: 430 long tons (437 t)
- Length: 50.29 m (165 ft 0 in)
- Beam: 7.31 m (24 ft 0 in)
- Draught: 2.74 m (9 ft 0 in)
- Complement: 40 (Note: The "Ever-Victorious Army" (2010) lists 40 men in 1862, while China at War: An Encyclopedia (2012) notes in 1860 Confucius had at least 83 Filipino sailors who participated in one attack.)
- Armament: 3 guns

Confucius (Chinese: 孔夫子; pinyin: Kǒngfūzǐ; Wade–Giles: K'ung Fu Tzu) was an early armed riverboat of the Qing dynasty, and one of the earliest modern vessels of China.

Confucius was purchased in July or August 1855, funded by shipping merchants in Shanghai as a response to an increase in piracy due to the Taiping Rebellion. She was transferred to Shanghai's Pirate Suppression Bureau, where she was used as an armed patrol vessel. During her service as a patrol vessel, she was commanded by an American sailor called Gough, and American sailor Frederick Townsend Ward served as the ship's executive officer. Ward would later distinguish himself in battles and assigned the commander of the Ever Victorious Army.

Thereafter, Confucius became part of the Army. In 1860, she took part in the recapture of Songjiang from Taiping rebels. In 1862, she took part in recapturing Ningbo, where she was commanded by Albert Édouard Le Brethon de Caligny. Later that year, she took part in the Battle of Cixi, where Ward was killed in action. Confucius brought Ward's body back to Shanghai.

After the war, Confucius was transferred to Li Hongzhang's fleet in Jiangsu. There, the ship was renamed Tien Ping (Chinese: 天平; pinyin: Tiānpíng), after the model of the steam engine on board. She then returned to patrol duties, and her further fate is unknown.
