= French gunboat Le Brethon =

History

France
- Name: Le Brethon
- Namesake: Lieutenant Albert Édouard Le Brethon de Caligny
- Ordered: 2 September 1862
- Builder: Ningbo
- Laid down: 20 July 1863
- Launched: 17 September 1864
- Stricken: 19 April 1869
- Fate: Struck and sold for scrap on 19 April 1869

General characteristics
- Class & type: Kenney-class gunboat
- Displacement: 268 tonnes
- Length: 35.4 m (116 ft 2 in)
- Beam: 6.7 m (22 ft 0 in)
- Draught: 2 m (6 ft 7 in)
- Propulsion: Sail; 360 shp (270 kW) steam engine
- Armament: 1 × 16-pounder gun; 2 × 12-pounder gun

Le Brethon was Kenney-class gunboat of the French Navy. She served in the Far East, notably during the French campaign against Korea of 1866.

== Career ==
Started as Aigrette upon plans by engineer Verny, using a steam engine cannibalised from the French gunboat Salve, the ship was renamed Le Brethon on 25 September 1863, after Lieutenant Albert Édouard Le Brethon de Caligny. Le Brethon was commissioned in Shanghai on 9 November 1864 and appointed to the Cochinchina Division. Decommissioned on 1 June 1865, she was reactivated on 1 March 1866 and took part in the French campaign against Korea under Huché de Cintré.
