= Albert Édouard Le Brethon de Caligny =

French Navy officer (1833–1863)

- Born: 11 December 1833; Pont-l'Évêque, Calvados
- Died: 17 January 1863 (aged 29); Shaoxing
- Military career
- Allegiance: France; Qing Empire
- Branch: French Navy; Military of the Qing dynasty
- Service years: 1853 - 1863
- Rank: Lieutenant de vaisseau

Albert Édouard Le Brethon de Caligny (11 December 1833 Pont-l'Évêque, Calvados – 17 January 1863, Shaoxing) was a French Navy officer and founder of the Ever Victorious Army. (clarification needed)

== Career ==
After studies at the École Polytechnique, Le Brethon joined the French Navy, rising to midshipman in 1855. He served on Persévérante and on Lavoisier before rising to Ensign on 9 October 1857.

He took part in the Italian unification on Tempête in 1859 before transferring on the frigate Forte the next year. He distinguished himself during the Battle of Shanghai while leading a landing party, and was awarded command of Confucius.

Promoted to lieutenant on 10 May 1862, Le Brethon was tasked to instruct locally recruited troops, leading to the training of the Ever Victorious Army. From October, he commanded a mixed troop of French and Chinese soldiers fighting the Taiping Rebellion. On 17 January 1863, he was killed at Shaoxing by the explosion of an artillery piece.

Posthumously promoted to general in the Chinese Army, he was buried at Kangpo. The gunboat Aigrette was renamed to Le Brethon in his honour.

== Notes, citations, and references ==
Notes

Citations

References

- Roche, Jean-Michel (2005). Dictionnaire des bâtiments de la flotte de guerre française de Colbert à nos jours 1 1671 - 1870. p. 85. ISBN 978-2-9525917-0-6. OCLC 165892922.
- LE BRETHON de COLIGNY Albert, Édouard, MÉMORIAL DES OFFICIERS DE MARINE
