= Eastern Expedition =

19th-century conflict in China

The Eastern Expedition encompassed the Taiping Heavenly Kingdom's efforts to capture the Yangtze River Delta, the provinces of Jiangsu, Anhui, and Zhejiang. Most of the areas would eventually be occupied by the Taipings, but they were notably repulsed at several locations, especially the city of Shanghai. Following the Jintian uprising in the southern province Guangxi and the beginning of open hostilities, Taiping forces attacked and captured Nanjing in central China by 1853. The Western Expedition captured cities along the Yangtze River like Zhenjiang, Anqing were captured later the same year

When Hong Rengan arrived in Tianjing in 1859, he became one of the most senior military officials. Hong used a strategy to draw Qing's attention away from Tianjing by attacking areas to the east like Hangzhou and Suzhou. Then Taiping forces counter attacked Qing armies besieging the capital, successfully lifting the siege. In 1860, during the Second rout the Army Group Jiangnan (1860) Taiping forces captured the following cities: Changzhou (May 26), Wuxi (May 30), Suzhou (June 2), Wujiang (13 June), Jiaxing (15 June). Ningbo is captured by the Taipings in December 1861. Taiping armies advanced towards Shanghai by 1861, but were repulsed with the help of foreign mercenaries like the Ever Victorious Army.
