= Chinese gunboat Hyson =

Hyson
History

Qing Empire
- Name: Hyson; Ching Po
- Namesake: Hyson tea
- Acquired: 1865
- Fate: Sold, 1877

General characteristics
- Class & type: Gunboat
- Length: 21.33 m (70 ft 0 in)
- Beam: 7.31 m (24 ft 0 in)
- Draught: 1.52 m (5 ft 0 in)
- Complement: 38
- Armament: 1 × 32-pounder gun; 1 × 12-pounder howitzer

Hyson (Chinese: 海生; pinyin: Hǎishēng; Wade–Giles: Haisheng) is an early gunboat of the Qing dynasty.

== History ==
Hyson was an armed paddle steamer of the Ever Victorious Army. She was an amphibious vessel, as her wheels allowed her to move across creek beds too shallow for her to float on.

She was originally commanded by an American named Davidson, and later by Charles George Gordon. In 1863, carrying around 350 men and some field artillery, she took part in the retaking of Quinsan.

She was purchased in April or May 1865 by Shanghai daotai Ding Richang on orders from Li Hongzhang. In July or August 1865, she was transferred to the Shanghai's Pirate Suppression Bureau, and performed patrol duties near Shanghai.

Hyson was eventually transferred to the Qing customs and renamed Ching Po (Chinese: 靜波; pinyin: Jìngbō; lit. 'Quiet Waves'). She was sold in 1877.
