= Henry Andres Burgevine =

American sailor and mercenary (1836–1865)

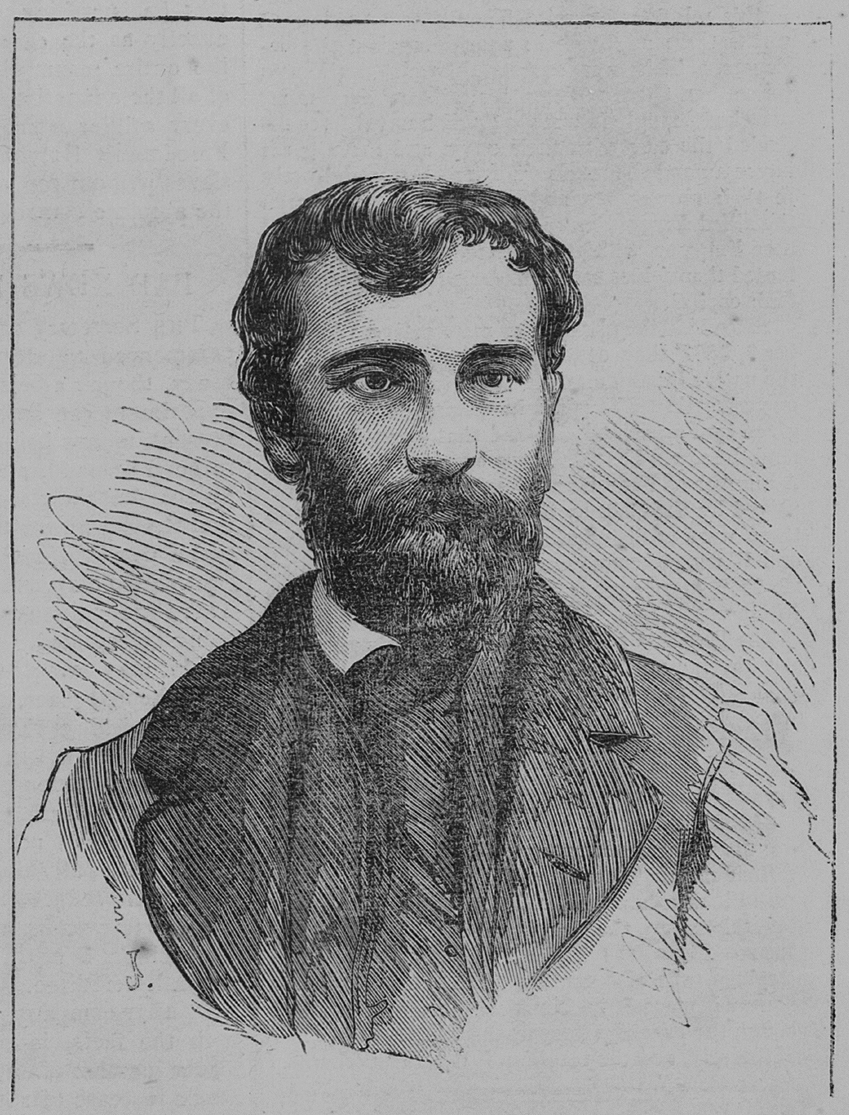
Henry Andres Burgevine.

Henry Andres Burgevine (Chinese: 白齊文) (1836–1865) was an American sailor of French ancestry, mercenary and soldier of fortune, who became famous for his military victories for the Qing dynasty during the Taiping Rebellion.

== Family ==
According to Caleb Carr in his biography of Frederick Townsend Ward, Burgevine was the child of a French officer who had served under Napoleon Bonaparte and who had moved to Chapel Hill, North Carolina where he became an instructor in French at the University of North Carolina at Chapel Hill. His father, after having been caught misappropriating funds by the president of the university, then died in a brawl in South Carolina. Burgevine then lived with his grandparents and sister in Ashford, North Carolina.

== Career ==
At age seven Burgevine moved to Washington, D.C., with his mother and became a Congressional and then a senatorial page until 1853. After travels in India, Hawaii and Australia, he then returned to Washington and then enlisted in the French Army for the duration of the Crimean War, where he was decorated for bravery.

In the early stages of the Taiping Rebellion he sided with the Qing Army, serving as the deputy commander of Ever Victorious Army, and succeeding the commander, Frederick Townsend Ward to command the Ever Victorious Army after Ward's death at the Battle of Cixi in September 1862. Burgevine's assignment was against Ward's will, who wished his loyal Filipino subordinate Macanaya to succeed him as the commander, but the imperial Chinese court selected Burgevine instead. However, Burgevine betrayed the Qing dynasty by later defecting and joining Li Shixian's army. He was later repatriated to the United States but he returned to China after completing half of his journey. On his return Qing police arrested him once again. In 1865 he drowned along with 10 Qing police in Xiamen's sea on the way to Shanghai, China, although some historians believed that Burgevine was murdered on Li Hongzhang's orders.

== Sources ==
- Draft History of Qing annals ch131 The American

Government offices
Preceded by Frederick Townsend Ward	Ever Victorious Army; October 1862 – June 1863	Succeeded by Charles George Gordon
