= Great Hsi-Ku Arsenal =

Qing dynasty arsenal near Tianjin, China

The Great Hsi-Ku Arsenal (Chinese: 西沽武庫; pinyin: Xīgū wǔkù) was a Qing dynasty imperial arsenal that stored munitions, rifles, and millions of rounds of ammunition. In addition, tons of rice and medical supplies were also stored there. The facility was guarded by Qing imperial troops using rifles and Krupp field guns mounted as defensive batteries. On the banks of the Hai River, it was located approximately eight miles northwest of Tianjin, China.

It was principal in providing an impromptu safe haven for Western troops retreating from a failed rescue attempt (Seymour Relief Expedition) of the Beijing foreign legations during the 1900 Boxer Rebellion in China.

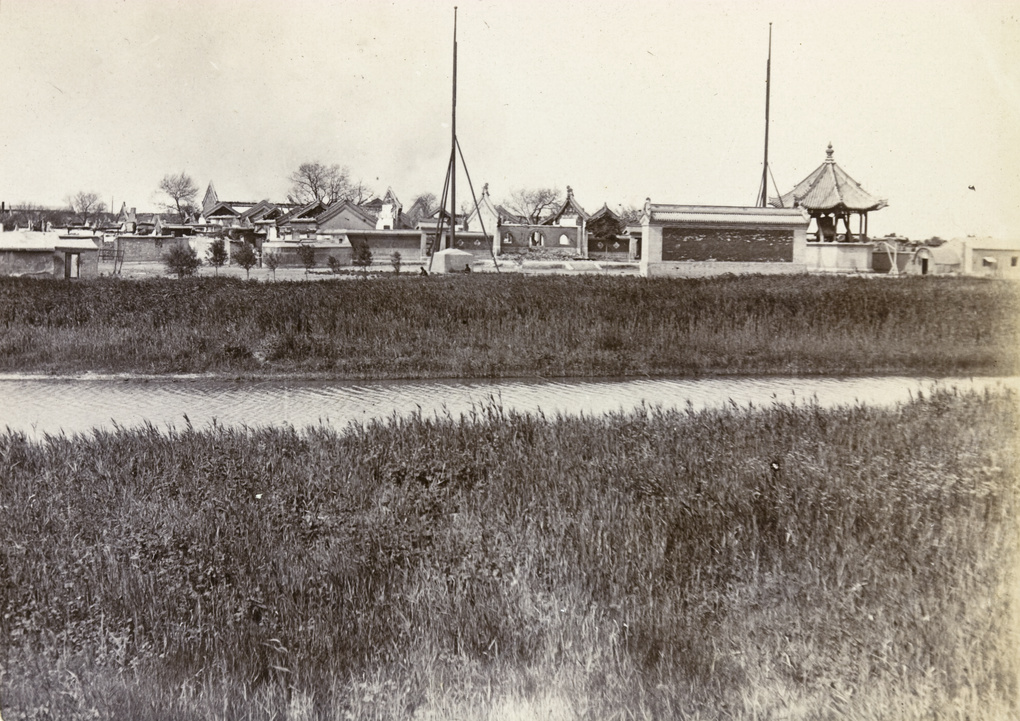
The ruins of the Great Hsi-Ku arsenal at Haiguangsi, taken in 1900

== See also ==
- Self-Strengthening Movement
- Hanyang Arsenal
- Taiyuan Arsenal
- Foochow Arsenal
- Jiangnan Shipyard
- Peiyang University
