= Seymour Expedition =

Expedition of the Boxer Rebellion

- Part of the Boxer Rebellion
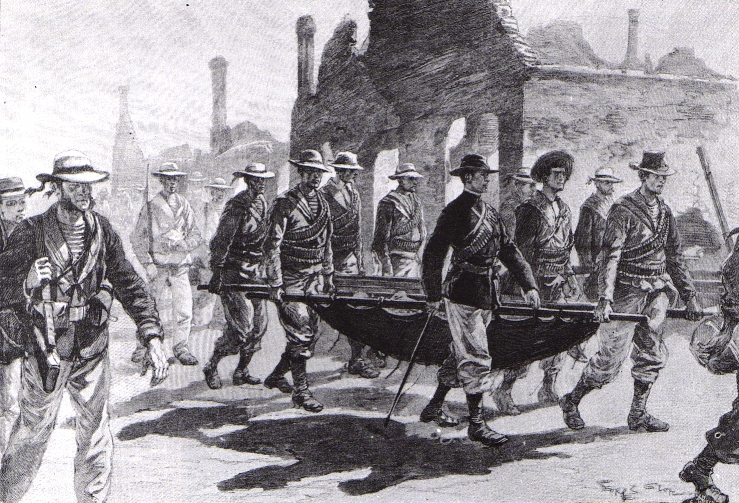
- Seymour returning to Tianjin with his wounded men
Date	10–28 June 1900
Location	Tianjin, China
Result	Chinese victory

Belligerents
Eight-Nation Alliance British Empire Russia Japan France Germany United States Italy Austria-Hungary	Boxer movement; Qing dynasty

Commanders and leaders
(United Kingdom of Great Britain and Ireland) Edward Seymour (United Kingdom of Great Britain and Ireland) David Beatty (German Empire) Guido von Usedom (Russian Empire) Nikolai Linevich (United States) Bowman McCalla (Empire of Japan) Yamashita Gentarō (Kingdom of Italy) Carlo Caneva (Austria-Hungary) Georg von Trapp	(Qing dynasty) Dong Fuxiang (Qing dynasty) Ma Fulu (Qing dynasty) Ma Fuxiang (Qing dynasty) Ma Haiyan (Qing dynasty) Yao Wang (Qing dynasty) Nie Shicheng; Ni Zanqing

Strength
(United Kingdom of Great Britain and Ireland) 916 marines (German Empire) 540 soldiers (Russian Empire) 312 sailors (French Third Republic) 158 sailors (United States) 112 marines (Empire of Japan) 54 sailors (Kingdom of Italy) 40 soldiers (Austria-Hungary) 25 sailors 2,157 total	Tenacious Army; 3,000 Muslim Kansu Braves; 2,000 Boxers

Casualties and losses
62 dead 232 wounded	Unknown

The Seymour Expedition (Chinese: 西摩爾遠征) was an attempt by a multinational military force led by Admiral Edward Seymour to march to Beijing and relieve the Siege of the Legations from attacks by Qing China government troops and the Boxers in 1900. The Chinese and Boxer fighters defeated the Seymour armies and forced them to return to Tianjin (Tientsin). It was followed later in the summer by the successful Gaselee Expedition.

== Historical background ==
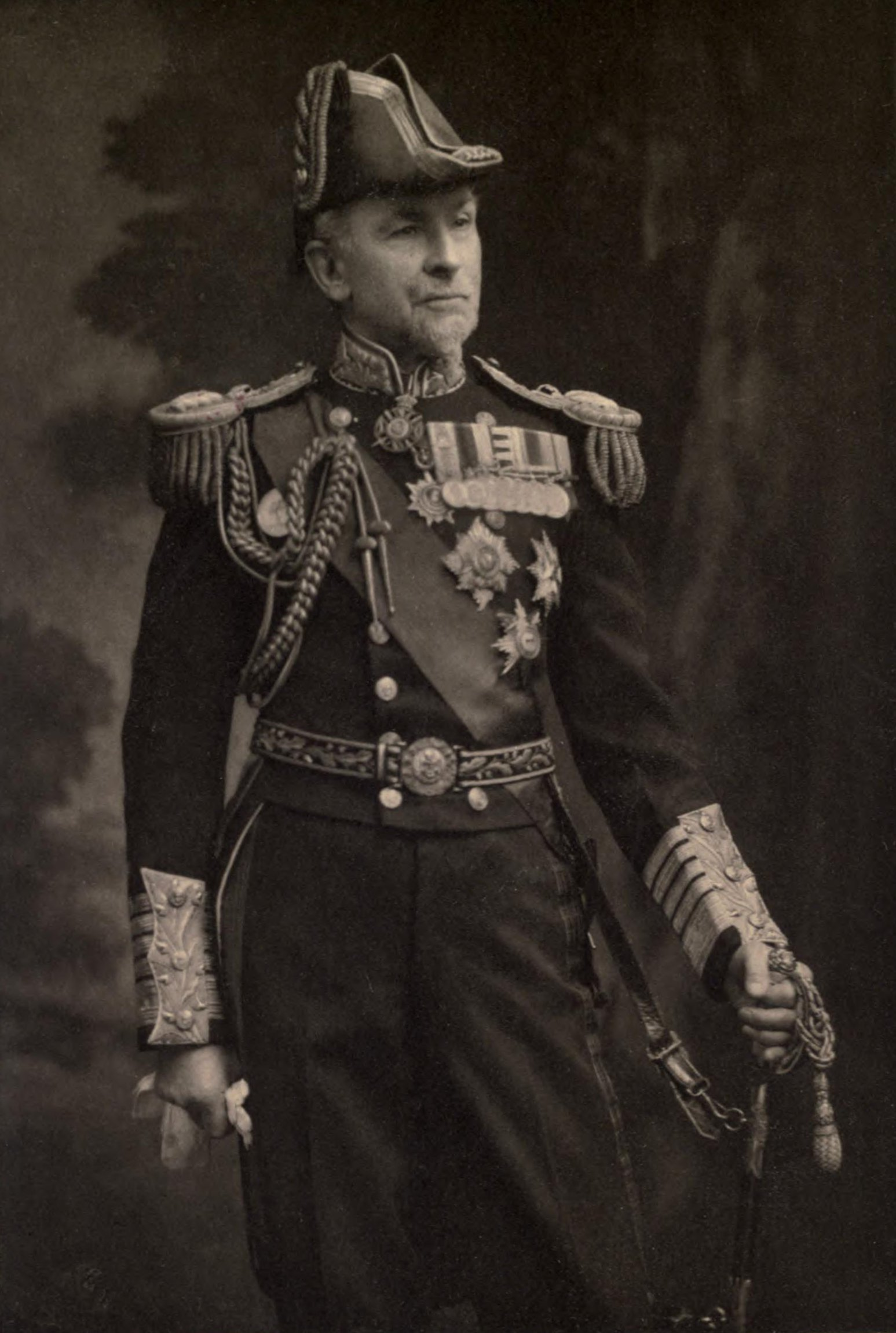
Vice-Adm. Sir Edward Hobart Seymour

Boxer bands advanced on Beijing in May and June 1900. The Qing court was ambivalent about the Boxers, fearing that they might become anti-Qing. The Boxers became a serious threat to Western and Japanese citizens, murdering missionaries and Chinese Christians living in northern China. The diplomatic legations in Beijing requested that guards be sent to protect them. As such, more than 400 marines and naval troops from eight countries arrived in Beijing on 31 May. However, as the Boxers began posing a more significant threat, it became apparent that additional troops were needed. On 9 June, Sir Claude Maxwell MacDonald, the British Minister in China, cabled Vice-Admiral Edward Hobart Seymour, commander of the British navy's China Station, that the situation in Beijing was becoming more serious and that troops should be landed with all arrangements made for an advance to Peking [Beijing] at once.

Responding to MacDonald's message, Seymour assembled in 24 hours a force of more than 2,000 sailors and marines from European, American, and Japanese warships. He prepared to embark for Beijing by train from Tianjin, 75 miles away. His force consisted of 916 British, 455 Germans, 326 Russians, 158 French, 112 Americans, 54 Japanese, 41 Italians, and 26 Austrians. Seymour's Chief of Staff was Capt. John Jellicoe.

The diplomats in Beijing anticipated that Seymour would arrive on 11 June. They neither requested the imperial court's permission nor informed the court of their intentions. They had, in effect, launched an invasion.

== Advance toward Beijing ==
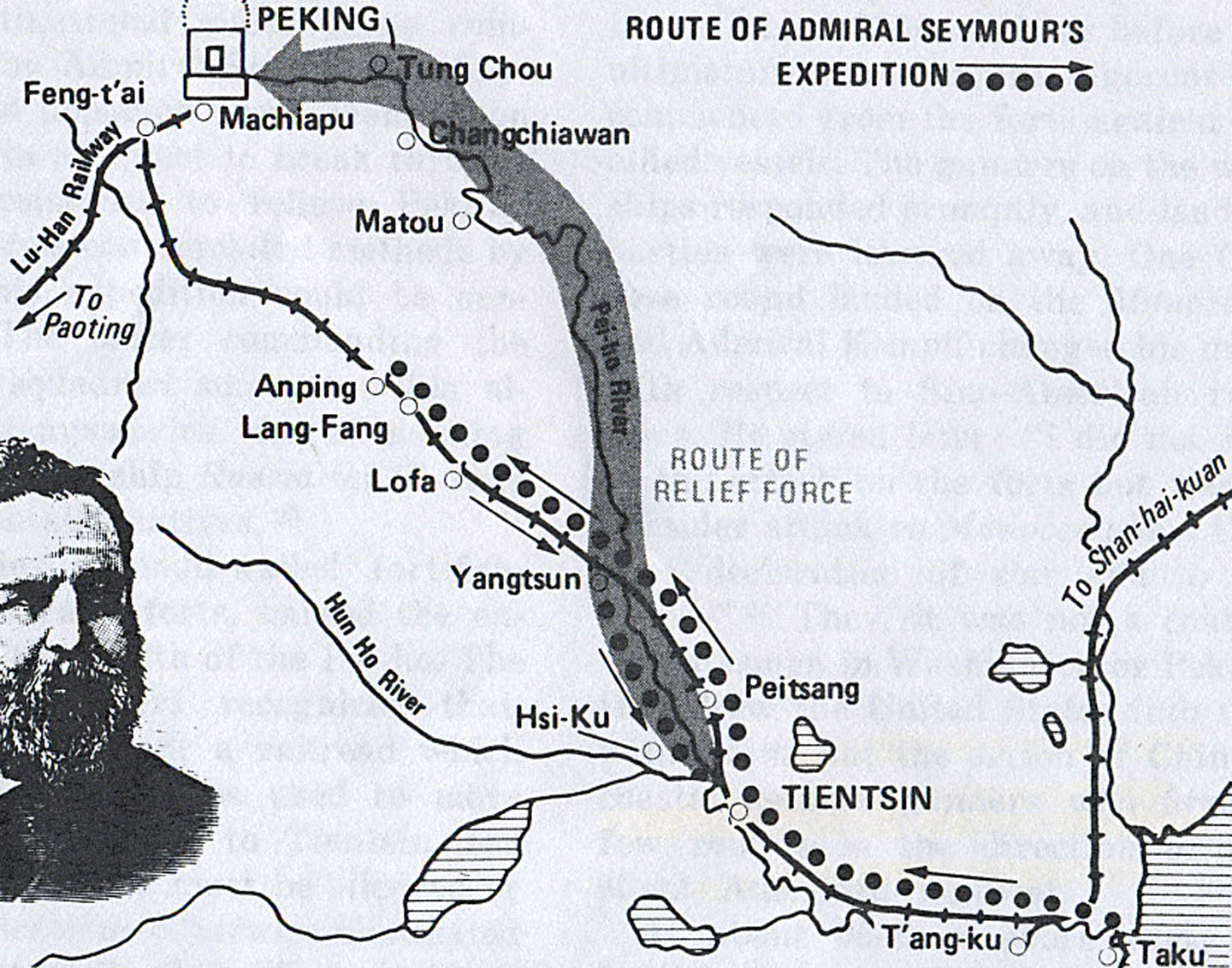
The route of Seymour's Expedition

Seymour commandeered five trains in Tianjin and departed for Beijing with his entire force on the morning of 10 June. On the first day, the soldiers travelled 25 miles without incident, crossing a bridge at Yancun over the Hai River unopposed; although Chinese Gen. Nie Shicheng and thousands of his soldiers were camped there, Nie's soldiers were friendly and did not attack. Nie had let Seymour's army slip past because he had deliberately been issued contradictory orders by Ronglu, a Manchu political and military leader who was working to derail the efforts to capture the legations. The next few days went slowly, as Seymour had to repair railroad tracks and fight off Boxer attacks as his trains advanced. On 14 June, several hundred Boxers armed with swords, spears, and gingals attacked Seymour twice and killed five Italian soldiers. The Americans counted 102 Boxer bodies left on the battlefield at the end of one battle.

The Chinese government had reversed its earlier positions after learning of the invasion, deciding to absorb the Boxer forces and order the army to defend against Seymour's march to the capital.

=== Battle of Langfang ===
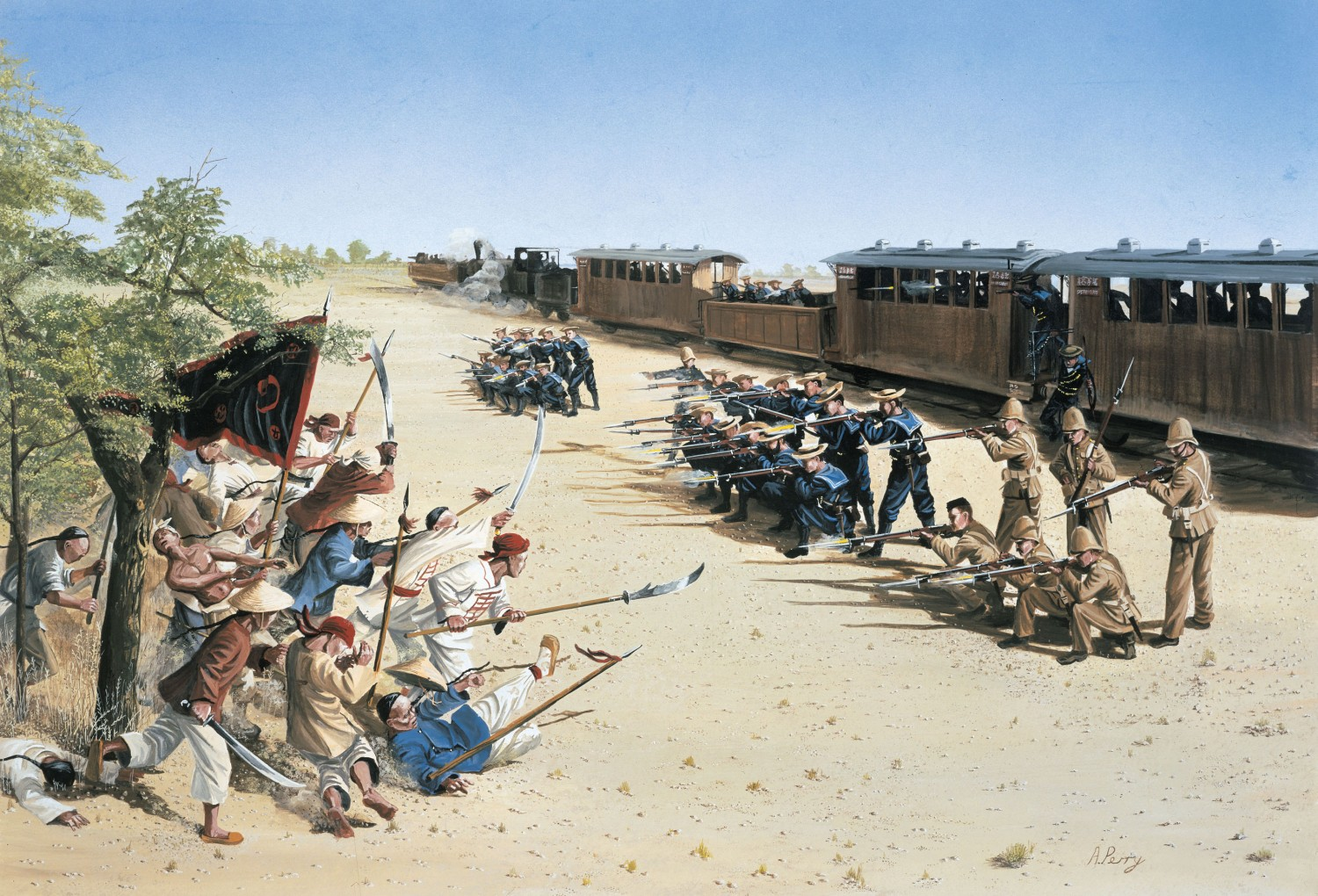
1900 illustration of the Battle of Langfang

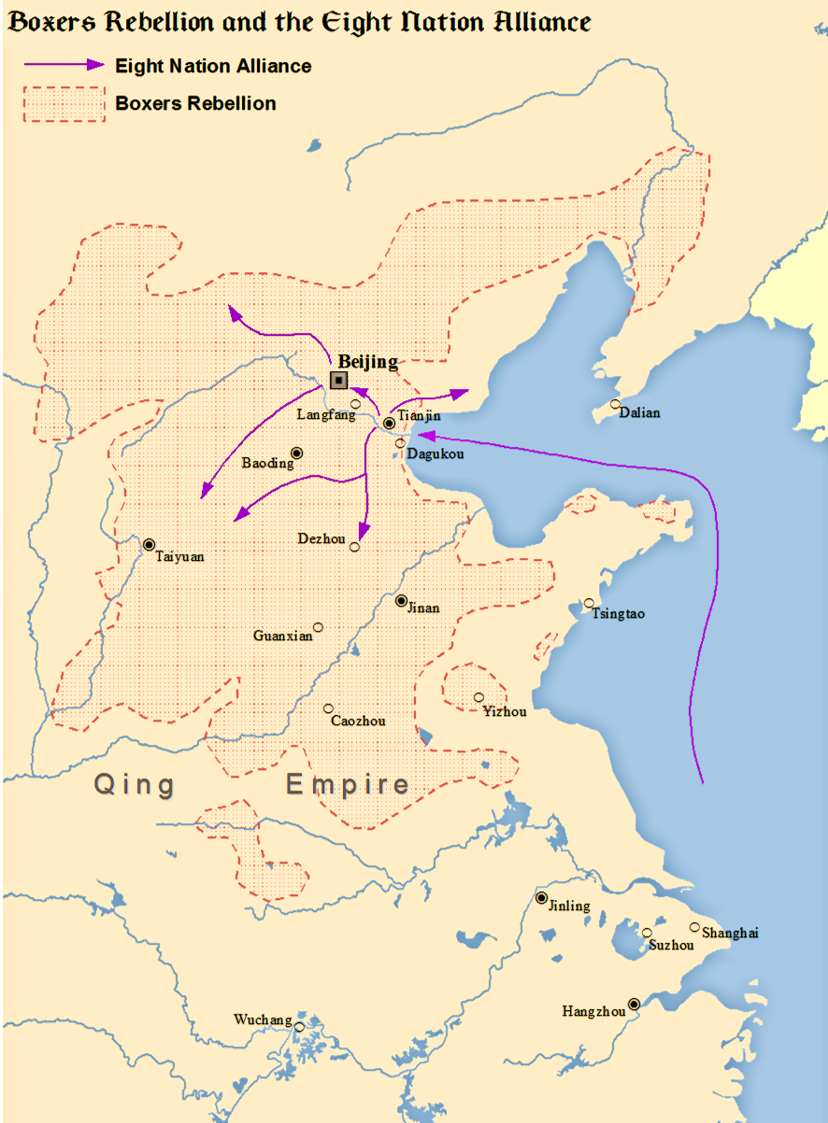
Boxer Rebellion and Eight-Nation Alliance, China 1900-1901

Gen. Dong Fuxiang, along with his Kansu (Chinese Muslim) Braves, prepared to ambush the force. Gen. Ma Fuxiang and Gen. Ma Fulu personally planned and led the attack, with a pincer movement around the European force. On 18 June, Dong Fuxiang's troops, stationed at Hunting Park in southern Beijing, attacked at multiple points, including Langfang. The force of 5,000 included cavalrymen armed with modern rifles. The foreign troops, especially the Germans, fought off the attack, killing hundreds of Chinese at a loss of seven dead and 57 wounded. The Kansu Braves lost 200 and the Boxers another 200. The need to care for the wounded, a lack of supplies, and the likelihood of additional Chinese attacks led Seymour and his officers to decide to retreat to Tianjin. The Chinese army's unexpected attack on Seymour was a response to the European and Japanese attack on the Dagu Forts two days previously; combined with news of Seymour's incursion, the formally neutral Qing government threw its full support behind the Boxer movement.

During one of the battles at Langfang, Boxers armed with swords and spears charged the British and American troops. The British were armed with .303 Lee–Metford rifles, while the Americans carried with them the M1895 Lee Navy. At point-blank range, one British soldier had to fire four bullets into a Boxer before he stopped; the American commander, Bowman McCalla, also reported that his men had witnessed Boxers sustaining multiple bullet wounds before dying.

== The retreat ==
Seymour turned his five trains around and headed back toward Tianjin. However, he found that either the Boxers or the Chinese Army had destroyed the bridge across the Hai River he had crossed previously. The expedition would either have to cross the river by boat and walk eighteen miles to Tianjin along the railroad or follow the river for a longer route of 30 miles. The sailors, perhaps more comfortable near water, chose to follow the river; Seymour did not challenge their decision despite the overland route being shorter and less exposed.

Seymour's retreat down the Hai River was slow and difficult, covering only three miles the first day. The riverbanks were densely populated with civilians sympathetic to the Boxers who ambushed the soldiers as they passed and caused further delays. Additional casualties included Capt. Jellicoe, who suffered a near-fatal wound. By 22 June, the soldiers were out of food and down to fewer than 10 rounds of ammunition per man; only the Americans had thought to pack additional rounds. However, they reportedly never considered surrendering.

On 23 June, six miles from Tianjin, Seymour came across the Chinese army's Xigu fort and arsenal which, inexplicably, was nearly undefended. Seymour captured it and appropriated the food, weapons and ammunition within; thus was able to repel the pursuing Chinese army which attempted to dislodge them.

A Chinese servant of the British slipped through to Tianjin and raised the alarm. A force of 2,000 soldiers marched out of the city to the arsenal on 25 June, and escorted Seymour's men back to Tianjin the next day. The Chinese did not oppose their passage. A missionary reported their arrival in Tianjin: "I shall never forget to my dying day, the long string of dusty travel-worn soldiers, who for a fortnight had been living on quarter rations, and fighting every day . . . the men were met by kind ladies with pails of tea which the poor fellows drunk as they had never drunk before – some bursting into tears." Of the initial 2,000 men in the Seymour expedition, there were 62 dead and 232 wounded.

The besieged foreigners in the legations in Beijing, unaware of the defeat, held out hope for several weeks after that Seymore would come to their aid. Even the Chinese government were initially unaware of the victory.

== Assessment ==
The Seymour expedition was described in foreign media as a "serious failure" and a "humiliation". Seymour had underestimated his Chinese opponent, trusting that he could push through to Beijing quickly with little or no opposition. Instead, "Seymour's expedition became a large moving target for the Boxers and Imperial troops. The would-be rescuers ... required rescue themselves." The Western and Japanese soldiers and civilians in Beijing were left to withstand a 55-day siege by the Boxers and their Qing allies. It took more than a month after the Seymour expedition for the Eight-Nation Alliance to organize a larger and better-equipped army to defeat the Chinese and march on Beijing in order to relieve the siege of the legation quarter.

Compared to the well-armed and trained Western forces, the Boxers had only limited quantities of firearms and largely fought with spears and swords; most of them were boys and common peasants who would simply charge directly into rifle fire without protection. Yet they fought with unmatched courage and determination, sometimes even faking death before springing back up when the enemy approached; an Allied soldier, Bigham, said they had no "fear" or "hesitation".

The expedition failed for several reasons, chief among them being overconfidence on the part of the Westerners, who regarded the Chinese as cowards and barbarians with no fighting skill; thus, the expedition was lightly armed and supplied on the assumption that reaching Beijing would be a matter of days. The Spectator pointed out that the expedition was "to embark on the assumption that any force of Europeans however small can beat any force of Chinamen however large." Further reasons include the loss of communication between the expedition and the Tianjin command due to Boxer sabotage of telegraph lines, the over-reliance on rail transport coupled with a failure to guard the railway (which allowed the bridge to be destroyed and rendered the trains useless), and the overall lack of strategic planning and vision of Admiral Seymour.
