= Frederick Townsend Ward =

American sailor and mercenary (1831–1862)

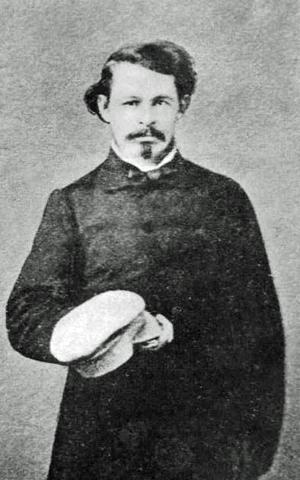
- Ward in 1861
- Born: November 29, 1831; Salem, Massachusetts, United States
- Died: September 22, 1862 (aged 30) Tzeki (Cixi), Chekiang (Zhejiang), Qing Dynasty
- Allegiance: Republic of Sonora; French Empire; Qing dynasty
- Branch: French Army; Qing Imperial Army
- Service years: 1854–1855 (France); 1860–1862 (Imperial China)
- Rank: Lieutenant (France); General (Imperial China)
- Commands: Ever Victorious Army
- Conflicts: Taiping Rebellion: Battle of Cixi (DOW)

Frederick Townsend Ward
- Traditional Chinese: 華爾
- Simplified Chinese: 华尔
Transcriptions
Standard Mandarin
- Hanyu Pinyin: Huá Fēiliè
- Wade–Giles: Hua2 Fei1-lieh4

Frederick Townsend Ward (Chinese: 華爾; November 29, 1831 – September 22, 1862) was an American sailor and mercenary known for his military service in Imperial China during the Taiping Rebellion. He commanded the Ever Victorious Army, a joint Sino-foreign force, against the Taiping rebels. He remained in command of the Ever Victorious Army until his death in battle in 1862, after which leadership was taken over by Henry Andres Burgevine.

== Early life and education ==
Ward was born in Salem, Massachusetts on November 29, 1831 to Frederick Gamaliel Ward, a ship’s master and to Elizabeth Colburn Spencer. The Wards could trace their ancestry back to Salem English colonist, Miles Ward (1615-1650) a mariner and landowner from East Ruston, Norfolk. Ward was rebellious in his youth, so his father removed Ward from school in 1847 and found him a position as second mate on the Hamilton, a clipper ship commanded by a family friend. Another version is that Ward demanded to leave school.

Life at sea proved difficult. Ward was given authority over many "old salts". He was thrown overboard after complaints that he gave too many orders for a youth. Captain William Allen recalled that Ward possessed traits of "reckless daring", but was on the whole a valuable officer.

On the Hamilton, Ward sailed from New York to Hong Kong in 1847, but probably saw little beyond the port city because the Qing dynasty forbade foreigners from venturing inland (Hong Kong Island had become a British Crown Colony in 1842, at the end of the First Opium War).

In 1849, Ward enrolled at the American Literary, Scientific and Military Academy, now Norwich University in Vermont from 1846 to 1848, where the curriculum included military tactics, strategy, drill, and ceremonies. In 1850 he shipped out as first mate of the clipper ship Russell Clover. His father was the captain.

=== Timeline through the 1850s ===
- 1850 First Mate, clipper ship Russell Clover, New York to San Francisco. Visits Gold Fields (?) Meets Giuseppe Garibaldi in Panama or Peru (?)
- 1851 First Mate, trading barque, San Francisco & Shanghai. Sailor, coastal cargo ships, China coast
- 1852 Sailor, coastal cargo ships, China coast, First Officer (XO), cargo ship Gold Hunter, carrying coolie labor to Mexico. Debarks in Tehuantepec, Mexico. Meets William Walker, joins Walker forces as filibuster.
- 1853 Part of Walker's Sonora Filibuster Invasion of Mexico, resigns sometime in 1853 or 1854, remains in Mexico
- 1854 Mexico, scrap metal business. Venture fails, travels to San Francisco by mule. First Mate, Westward Ho! clipper ship, San Francisco – New York – Hong Kong. Refuses to filibuster for Manchu Government unwilling to employ Westerners. Ward returns to New York, enlists in French Army, Enters Crimean War
- 1855 Ward in Crimean War, allowed to resign after insubordination to superior
- 1856 Whereabouts unknown
- 1857 China, First Mate on coastal steamship Antelope
- 1858 Mercenary for Juarez in Mexico(?) Texas Ranger (?)
- 1859 New York City, clerk in father's shipping agency office. Travels to San Francisco en route to Shanghai (accompanied by brother Harry)
- 1860 Arrives in Shanghai, (never to return to United States). XO on the Confucius, armed pirate suppression river steamer. Commander, Foreign Army Corps.

== Filibustering ==
Aside from working as a sailor during the 1850s, Ward found employment as a filibuster. Filibustering is "raising private mercenary armies and leading them into other countries to advance either [one's own] schemes or those of wealthy sponsors". Ward worked for the infamous "King of the Filibusters", William Walker, in Mexico, where he learned how to recruit, train, and command mercenary troops.

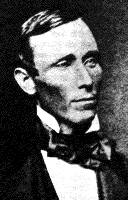
William Walker

Ward also learned to avoid some of Walker's practices and behaviors. Walker had a reputation for being "excessively vain, weak minded and ambitious… his weakness renders him cruel…" During Ward's later time in China, he displayed respect and concern for the Western and Chinese troops under his command, whom he referred to as "my people".

Ward learned about practical warfare during his "filibusteresque" experience in 1854 and when he served as a lieutenant with the French Army in the Crimean War. He learned about weapons, tactics, using riflemen in mobile platoons rather than in fixed firing lines and siege techniques. Ward also learned that the frontal assault was of limited value against disciplined long-range firepower, and he gained experience under fire. He did not serve throughout the entire war, because he was 'allowed' to resign after being insubordinate to a superior officer.

In 1857, Ward sought work as a mercenary, but when he did not secure such work, he served as the first mate on a coastal steamship in dangerous waters. He worked as a shipping agent in his father's New York City office alongside his brother in 1859.

== Shanghai newcomer ==
The Gen. Ward came to Penang on the steamer Ganges accompanied by the U.S. Minister and was transferred to the USS Powhatan on his way to Peking in May 1859. The American government also at the same time chartered the steamer Hong Kong to accompany Ward into the north and to return the remains of Ye Mingchen's for interment in Canton, 13 May 1859.

According to a contemporary account written in early 1862, Ward and his brother arrived in Shanghai, China in 1860 for the purpose of trading, perhaps as an extension of their father's New York office. This may be true, but given Ward's activities in the 1850s it is almost certain that Ward had ulterior motives for his return. He had little respect for the Shanghai business practices, which he dismissed as "lying, swindling and smuggling". Their arrival coincided with a buildup of Taiping forces in the area.

While Ward's brother set up a trading business in Shanghai, Ward himself took up customary employment as the executive officer on the Confucius, an armed riverboat commanded by an American, employed by the Shanghai Pirate Suppression Bureau. The Bureau was organized by Xue Huan and Wu Xu, Shanghai governmental officials who took pains to shield explicit imperial association with Western mercenaries and military, and primarily funded by Yang Fang, a prominent Ningbo banker and mercantilist.

Ward's show of bravery and initiative on board the Confucius reflected great credit upon him, and the prominent men of Shanghai took notice. His exploits, previous military experience, ability to empathise with local populations and motivate Chinese soldiers, and his stated mercenary intentions, made him an attractive candidate to lead a force of foreign nationals in defense of Shanghai against encroaching Taiping forces.

Wu Xu and Yang Fang both increasingly recognized that such a force was necessary, as Imperial forces, frequently staffed by Confucian scholars and conscripts, rather than experienced commanders and soldiers, had all too often proven unequal to the task of defeating Taiping forces.

Through their contacts with the Western business community, and Ward's own relentless self-promotion, in the spring of 1860 Wu and Fang reached out to Ward and became his employers. Ward then began scouring the wharves of Shanghai for every Westerner, sober or otherwise, capable of firing a weapon. With this, the Shanghai Foreign Arms Corps was born, which in defeat, would form the nucleus for the Ever Victorious Army.

== Shanghai Foreign Arms Corps ==
In 1860, both Chinese and Westerners would place more faith in a small, motley group of mercenaries than readily available local citizenry, because the average Chinese of the time had little understanding of marksmanship, nor much impetus to defend the Manchu throne. Further, with Taiping armies edging closer to Shanghai, there was no time to train native peasants in either conventional Chinese or Western warfare.

On the Shanghai docks, however, Westerners with diverse military experience existed as "discharged seamen, deserters, and other drifters who made Shanghai their temporary home, and even the gainfully employed could be tempted by the prospect of adventure, high pay, and loot" into joining Western-led mercenary endeavours.

This weapon, already forged, was used by Ward against the Taipings, with the backing of local Shanghai ministers and merchants, in a highly charged political atmosphere in which the Manchu Imperial forces had no desire to show their reliance upon Western powers. By the same token, the diplomats and military men of the Western powers discouraged foreign involvement in domestic Chinese matters, even by Westerners in Chinese employ. The Western powers' concerns did not relate to principle; they were most concerned about the power of the Taipings to block trade downriver from the interior to Shanghai if neutrality were violated.

By June 1860, Ward had a polyglot force of 100 Westerners, trained in the best small arms (including Colt revolvers) and rifles available for purchase in Shanghai. Protesting that his forces were not fully trained, Ward was forced by his Shanghai backers to take his men into action alongside Imperial forces probing Taiping advances, retaking two captured towns. They were then forced by circumstances (and the urging of their Shanghai backers) to assault the Taiping occupied and fortified city of Songjiang, without artillery—a near-impossible task.

The attack failed, sending the thoroughly defeated force back to Shanghai. However, by mid-July, Ward had recruited additional Westerners and over 80 Filipino "Manilamen", and purchased several artillery pieces, and once again, his forces assaulted Sung-Chiang (松江). They were successful, but at enormous cost. Out of a force of roughly 250 men, 62 were killed, and 100 were wounded, including Ward himself.

Ward and his forces now gained a notoriety that attracted new recruits (for the pay was attractive, even if looting was discouraged by Ward), and enraged local Westerners who saw Ward as an inflammatory, filibustering element sure to force the Taipings to stop the flow of trade. More disconcertingly, the Taipings themselves were now aware of a new and potent force against them.

On August 2, 1860, Ward led the Foreign Arms Corps against Chingpu (上海青浦), the next town from Sung-chiang on the approaches to Shanghai, and this time the Taiping were prepared. As the Corps stormed a garrison wall, Taiping forces lying in ambush waited for the optimum moment and then delivered a withering barrage of close-range musket fire. Within 10 minutes, the Foreign Arms Corps had suffered 50% casualties, and Ward himself was shot in the left jaw, with an exit wound in the right cheek, scarring him for life and leaving him with a speech impediment.

The force retreated and Ward returned to Shanghai for medical treatment and to attempt to recruit more forces and buy additional artillery. Within several days he and the remnants of the Foreign Arms Corps laid siege to Chingpu and bombarded it with artillery. By this time, the Taiping's best military leader Li Xiucheng (李秀成), called Zhong Wang (忠王) or "The Faithful King", dispatched 20,000 troops downriver to break the siege, sending the Foreign Arms Corps fleeing back to the Songjiang area, where Ward's second-in-command, Henry Andres Burgevine (another American fortune seeker), held the Corps briefly together, but it soon "ceased to function as an organized entity".

Ward returned to Shanghai for further treatment of his injury, and was there while the Zhong Wang's forces laid siege, and were beaten back by Western and Imperial forces within the city. Ward left Shanghai (apparently secretly) in late 1860 for further treatment of his facial wound, while the remnants of the Corps remained more or less under the command of Burgevine. After Ward's death, Burgevine briefly took command of the force, but could not get along with his Imperial Chinese superiors and struck Yang Fang, whereupon Burgevine was relieved of command; he later went over to the Taiping rebels. In 1865, Burgevine was arrested by Imperial officers and died in a drowning accident.

It is unclear as to whether Yang was still funding the Corps in the late fall of 1860, but upon Ward's return in the spring of 1861, Ward was able to attract desired elements of the Corps back to his employ. After his return, Ward tenaciously began to recruit and train replacements for the Foreign Arms Corps, offering terms attractive enough to cause desertion among the many British warships in port. Ward, facing arrest and numerous political difficulties arising from the Western governments' desire to remain neutral, opted to become a Chinese subject, by entering a seemingly rushed marriage with a Chinese woman. In addition, the provincial governor in Shanghai (who happened to be one of Ward's patrons) produced falsified papers (Ward would not become a citizen until February) ostensibly proving his Chinese citizenship. These papers were seemingly convincing enough that the US consul refused to prosecute him, at which point British Admiral James Hope locked him up in a room of his flagship to prevent more British men from being lured into Qing military service. Ward jumped through an open window late one night, and promptly disappeared.

In May 1861, Ward once again led the Foreign Arms Corps into battle at Chingpu, and once again, the assault failed, with heavy casualties. This was the last major engagement of the Foreign Arms Corps in its "primarily Western" configuration.

Judgments as to the effectiveness of the Foreign Army Corps vary depending upon the sympathies of the author. The most recent Ward biographer, Caleb Carr, seems fairly generous in his estimation of Ward's accomplishments in his 1992 work. However, perhaps the most authoritative judgment was rendered by Richard J. Smith, who stated:

Repeatedly sent into the field without adequate preparation by Ward's frantic sponsors, the poorly trained and ill-disciplined contingent stood virtually no chance of success against Li Xiucheng's seasoned troops. Sometimes drunk and always disorderly, the Foreign-Arms Corps depended primarily on the element of surprise and the superiority of Western weapons to obtain victory.

Ward clearly recognized the harsh truth of this statement. He soon embarked upon a new scheme, in which he would reform the more reliable elements of the Corps into the nucleus of an effective fighting force, composed primarily of local Chinese.

== Commander of the Ever Victorious Army ==
Credit for the concept of training Chinese in Western military tactics and arming them with the best available weaponry is sometimes given to Ward, other times to Li Hongzhang, a local Imperial commander "ordered to cooperate with — and keep an eye on — Ward's unruly contingent" and other times to Burgevine, who according to some began the training while Ward was recuperating, having been inspired by the sight of a Chinese gun crew acting under French direction.

Perhaps another factor in the reconsideration of local Chinese troops was the changing mood of the local peasantry. Where before they had been unwilling to fight for Manchu primacy, they were now constantly threatened and in some cases occupied by Taiping forces that were, despite their "heavenly" origin, ruthless in their treatment of local populations. Indeed, in many cases informal militias were formed to drive Taiping forces out, and conduct guerilla operations.

Regardless of the concept's true origin, Ward became its champion and after his untimely death, no other commander could quite repeat his success. Ward's decision to turn to local Chinese forces would ensure his place in history, and help to end the Taiping Rebellion.

By summer 1861, a training camp was established by Xue Huan's "right hand man" Wu Xu (吳煦) at Song Chiang (松江), where Ward set up operations. Working with the best of the survivors of the Foreign Arms Corp, and supported by a strong Headquarters staff, Ward trained an increasing number (see below) of Chinese in western small arms, gunnery, tactics, customs and drill and ceremonies. Particular care was taken to train the Chinese to hold their fire until their targets were within effective range. Chinese troops, both Taiping and Imperial, "had a lingering faith… in the intimidating power of noise".

He even trained them to respond to western bugle calls and verbal commands, and most strikingly, outfitted them in Western-style utility uniforms, color-coded for branch of arms (infantry or artillery), with Indian Sepoy-style turbans. This garb, at first distressing to the Chinese troops, earned them the nickname "Imitation Foreign Devils" among the local populace, as well as a fair share of mockery. In time, as the troops proved themselves the equal of their European counterparts, both on the parade ground and the battlefield, their distinct uniforms would become a point of pride.

Another point of pride was their pay, which was both high and consistent by Chinese standards – a strong recruiting drive that triumphed over most discomfort with unfamiliar uniforms. The pay was high in part to attract new recruits to dangerous work, but also to compensate for the lack of "looting" opportunity. Ward strongly discouraged looting, as he knew the practice turned local populaces against their "liberators". Other benefits offered to Ward's men included better rations, billets, and of course, better chance of survival in combat.

By January 1862, with about one thousand Chinese soldiers trained and ready, Ward stated that his unit was ready for the field – much to the relief of his Shanghai backers, particularly Yang Fang, who had significantly invested both government and private funds into the force's recruitment, arms and supplies. This was timely, as within the same month, the Chung Wang's forces reentered that region with over 120,000 troops, in an attempt to first cut off, and then enter and occupy Shanghai.

Ward, ever hungry for glory and no doubt seeking redress for his facial injury, welcomed the conflict, and was absolutely confident in his troops' ability to defend his Songjiang headquarters, while simultaneously operating as "flying columns" to be directed to strategic areas and Taiping vulnerabilities. He soon had several opportunities to test this confidence.

In the middle of January, about 10 miles north of Shanghai in Wu-Sung, and over 25 snow-covered miles from their own headquarters, Ward led his new army into action, under a banner carrying a Chinese rendering of his own name reading "HUA" (華, 华). His forces drove the Taipings from their entrenched positions, despite greater rebel numbers. A week later, after a return march, Ward's forces struck at the city of Guangfulin, occupied by over 20,000 Taiping troops, just five miles from Ward's own headquarters.

Ward, at the head of five hundred men, attacked the city without artillery support. The defenders, seeing the strange attire, military skill and foreign leadership of their own countrymen, wavered and "were filled with dismay and fled precipitately.

In February, again facing Taiping forces moving near his training area, Ward took five hundred troops and in joint operations with local Imperial commanders, drove the rebels from Yinchipeng, Chenshan, Tianmashan, and other areas around Songjiang. In the course of these actions against superior numbers, thousands of Taiping were killed or wounded, while Ward himself suffered five wounds, including the loss of a finger to a musket ball.

Li Xiucheng, enraged at this foreign irritant, had a force of 20,000 attack Songjiang, defended only by Ward's force of about 1,500 men. Upon approach, rebel forces came under the fire of camouflaged artillery and lost over 2,000 men. Immediately thereafter infantry struck out of the city at the rebels, and cut off and captured another 800, while capturing a large number of boats bearing Taiping supplies and arms.

The Taipings beat a hasty retreat, rather than lay siege to such a hornet's nest. It was this moment, perhaps, that secured Ward's reputation among all the people of the Shanghai area; Chinese, Western and Taiping alike. From this moment on, the key Western commanders and politicians would support him, funds for troops would flow relatively freely from Imperial coffers, and his decisions would no longer be second-guessed by his backers in Shanghai.

By March 1862, Ward's force would be officially named by the Qing government, and to history, as the "Ever Victorious Army", and Ward himself would be made first a 4th-rank, and then a 3rd-rank mandarin, high honors from the Manchu court for a "barbarian".

Through the course of 1862, the Ever Victorious Army (常勝軍) would essentially live up to its name, repeatedly defeating numerically superior opponents, often in entrenched positions. Further, its presence on the battlefield and example of effective Chinese soldiering served as a "force multiplier" for Imperial Anhui units commanded by Li Hongzhang, between whom and Ward mutual respect grew during joint operations.

During the summer, Ward's "duckfoot" background found immediate application to the problems of land warfare. The Chung Wang's growing Taiping forces in the area led to multiple threats at multiple points across the region. Clearly, mobility was needed for Ward's limited forces, but the road system was inadequate.

While another commander might have tried to solve the problem through additional wagons and horses, Ward saw the rivers and canals criss-crossing the region not as obstacles, but as passageways. He quickly secured the use of several river steamers, fitted them out as mobile artillery and troop transports, and increased his army's effectiveness several times over. Li Xiucheng himself later "attributed his defeats in the Suzhou area to Western steamers. Taiping land forces could contend with 'foreign devils,' he believed, but rebel water forces could not".

Throughout this time, Ward's reputation continued to grow. Ward himself, outwardly caring little for public adulation, still sought to quench some inner need for further glory, and hoped to participate in an eventual strike against Nanjing, the Taiping capital, but this was not to be. The Manchu court, suspicious of Ward from the beginning, grew even more concerned that as time passed, he refused to shave his forehead, wear a queue or even appear in his fine Mandarin robes. These and other comments regarding his ambitions led the court to limit the size of his unit far beneath his potential to recruit for it, and to give Ward far less rein than they would have to a commander with more Confucian leanings.

By September, the Ever Victorious Army would number over 5,000 men, organized in four battalions as well as an artillery corps, with several riverboats used for transport and mobile artillery.

== Ward's army: Troop strength over time ==
- June 1860: 100 Foreign mercenaries, (no artillery at this time)
- July 1860: 250 Foreign mercenaries, severe casualties, artillery present from this date on
- August 1860: 200+ Foreign mercenaries, severe casualties, perhaps 50% effective
- December 1860: Corps inactive (and unpaid?) while Ward absent
- May 1861: 200+ Foreign mercenaries, severe casualties
- June 1861: 50+ Foreign mercenaries, Chinese training camp established
- July 1861: 150 Chinese + foreign officers
- October 1861: 400 Chinese + foreign officers
- November 1861: Officially 430 Chinese + foreign officers, Spence states perhaps 3,000 more in actuality + armed riverboats & transports
- January 1862: 1,000 Chinese + foreign officers
- May 1862: 3,000 Chinese + foreign officers
- September 1862: 5,000 Chinese + foreign & Chinese officers

Sources – Carr, Smith, Spence

== Death in battle ==
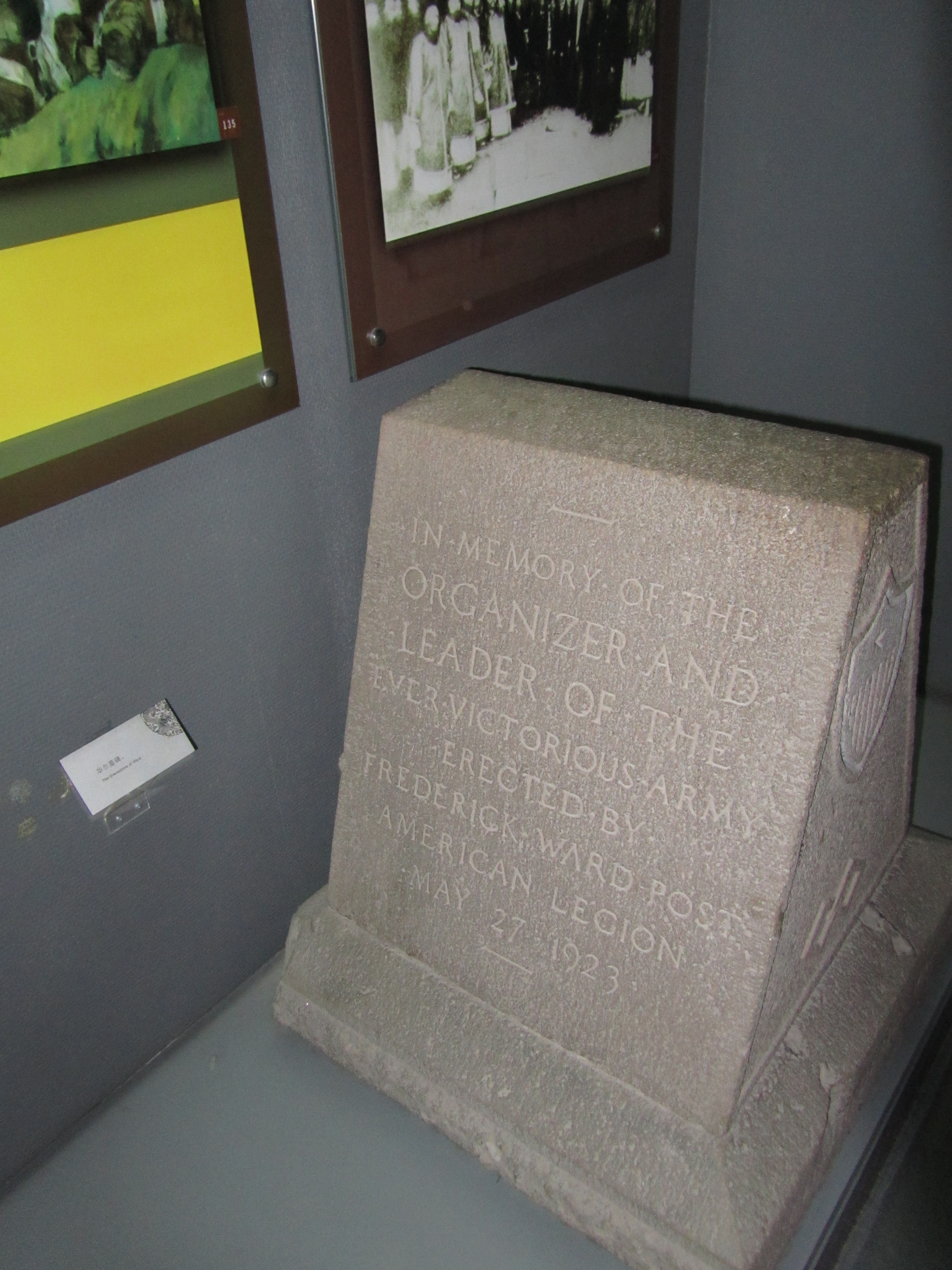
Ward's tombstone in Taiping Kingdom History Museum

Ward was mortally wounded in the Battle of Cixi, about 10 miles from Ningbo on September 21, 1862, when he was shot in the abdomen. One version is that he was wounded at the base of the city wall. Ward had survived 14 previous battlefield injuries.

Ward lingered for a day. During that time he dictated a will ensuring his brother, sister and Chinese wife, Chang Meihua, would be cared for; he died on the morning of September 22, 1862. A poor man when he entered China, Ward became able in his will to also bequeath a large sum of money towards the Union cause in his own country's Civil War.

== Legacy ==
Just as the events of the American Civil War overshadowed Ward's accomplishments in China during his life, his reputation after his death was overshadowed by Charles George Gordon, aka "Chinese Gordon", a British Army officer. After Ward's death, the command of the Ever-Victorious Army passed to his second in command, Henry Andres Burgevine, and later to Gordon. Gordon biographers diminish or disregard that Ward creation, the Ever Victorious Army, an original and unique military development which made Gordon's famed success in China possible. Today, Chinese Gordon is remembered, while Ward is largely forgotten. Some of Gordon's fame is due to his dramatic death in Khartoum years after the Taiping Rebellion.

There have been several books on Ward and the Ever Victorious Army by Ward's contemporaries and biographers published in the century since his death that seek to acknowledge Ward's contributions. The bestseller, The Devil Soldier (1992), by novelist and military historian Caleb Carr, was optioned for a motion picture soon after publication. Actor Tom Cruise and director John Woo were developing a movie scripted by Carr, but the project was never completed.

=== Physical remains and monuments ===
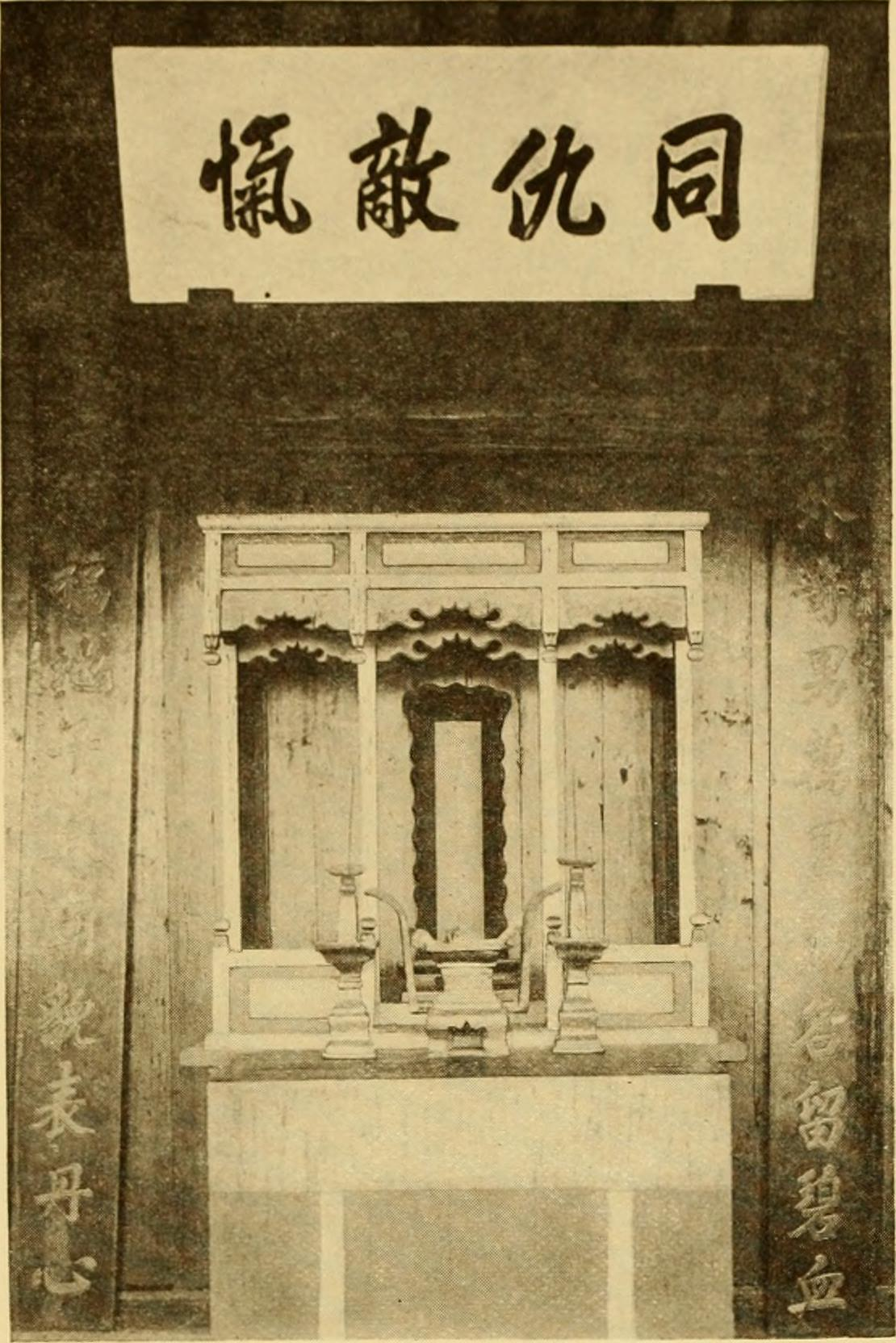
A Songjiang shrine to General Ward

There are just two U.S. memorials to Ward, both in Salem, Massachusetts: a headstone at an unfilled grave, and a collection of materials detailing his life and times by the Essex Institute. According to Caleb Carr, that "Ward's remains were dug up, and his grave site and shrine were destroyed and paved over. The whereabouts of Ward's bones today are unknown. They have almost certainly been destroyed. A plain headstone over a cenotaph in Salem is the only memorial to this most noteworthy of nineteenth-century American adventurers".

Ward is also remembered in a Songjiang Roman Catholic Church, and in a Nanjing museum. One visitor wrote "The grave of Ward, a Protestant, revered as a Chinese Confucian hero, with a temple in his honour, now lies under the altar of a Roman Catholic church [built in 1982], whilst the land itself is the property of the local Buddhist monastery in a Communist state… Ward has not been forgotten in Songjiang and local memory still has Ward's bones under the high altar of the Catholic church". Ward's accomplishments are documented in the Taiping Rebellion Museum in Nanjing. One visitor remarked "To my surprise I saw, in a museum in Nanjing, a tribute to Ward — a large headstone bearing Ward's name, put in place by the American Legion on May 29, 1923".

== In fiction ==
Ward appears in Flashman and the Dragon, the eighth volume of George MacDonald Fraser's fictional Flashman Papers as a gun smuggler (apocryphal) and as the leader of the embryonic Ever Victorious Army.

Ward appears as Fletcher Thorson Wood in the novel Yang Shen by James Lande, which relates the tale of the first three years of the Ever Victorious Army, from its beginning as the Foreign Rifles in 1860 through September 1862.

== Sources ==
- A Massachusetts Soldier Becomes A God Of The Chinese Some Events of Boston and Its Neighbors Boston, The State Street Trust Company, 1917. Hosted at kellscraft.com.
- original. The Columbia Encyclopedia, Sixth Edition. 2001, Bartleby.com.
- Frederick Townsend Ward. Appletons Encyclopedia, 2001. Virtualology.com.
- The King from the Sky —Conclusion— China Watch 2002, John Maher. Travel; Stickyourneckout.com.
- The American Soldier of fortune Frederick Townsend Ward honoured and revered by the Chinese with a memorial temple. Keith Stevens (PDF) Scan from Journal of the Hong Kong Branch of the Royal Asiatic Society, Vol. 38 (1998), 8 pages. Hong Kong Journals Online, University of Hong Kong.
- Frederick Townsend Ward Papers (MS 1666). Manuscripts and Archives, Yale University Library.
