= Nie Shicheng =

Chinese general (1836-1900)

- 聂士成
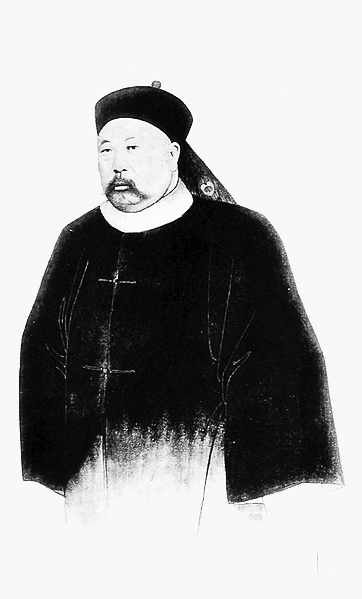
- Portrait in the 1934 book Portraits and Praises of the Loyal Heroes of the Gēngzǐ and Xīnhài Years
- Born: 1836; Anhui Province, Qing China
- Died: July 1900 (aged 63–64); Tianjin, Qing China
- Military career
- Allegiance: Qing dynasty
- Service years: 1850s–1900
- Rank: General
- Conflicts: Taiping Rebellion; Nian Rebellion; Sino-French War; First Sino-Japanese War; Boxer Rebellion; Battle of Tientsin †

Nie Shicheng (Chinese: 聂士成; pinyin: Niè Shìchéng; Wade–Giles: Nieh Shih-ch'eng; 1836 – July 1900) was a Chinese general of the Qing dynasty who served the imperial government during the Boxer Rebellion. Rising from obscure origins from Hefei, Anhui Province, in the early 1850s, Nie Shicheng managed to pass the county examinations for bureaucratic positions, but due to the Taiping Rebellion he was forced to abandon a bureaucratic career and become a soldier.

== Military career ==
In the late 1850s, Nie was in the service of Yuan Jiasan (the father of Yuan Shikai) against rebel forces in the Nian Rebellion, under whom he was commissioned as a lieutenant and then in the Huai Army in the suppression of the Taiping Rebellion, at the end of which he was promoted to general.

During the Sino-French War of 1885, Nie was sent with reinforcements to Taiwan, where he participated in combat operations against the French. After the war, he was sent to Lushunkou, where he was assigned to command the newly constructed base for the Beiyang fleet. During this time, he came into contact with numerous foreign military advisors hired by Beiyang commander Li Hongzhang. After the success of China's first imperial naval review in 1891, he was reassigned to command troops in Tianjin. During this period, he was active in the suppression of various minor revolts against the Qing dynasty, for which he was awarded the title of taiyuan (brigadier general) in 1892.

In 1893, at the request of Li Hongzhang, Nie conducted an inspection tour of the Manchurian borders with Russia and Korea, with the aim of planning strategies for potential combat operations.

=== First Sino-Japanese War ===
In April 1894, Nie was recalled from Manchuria due to the worsening situation in Korea vis-à-vis the Empire of Japan. By order of Li Hongzhang, he landed with a detachment of 800 soldiers in Asan, Korea on 9 June 1894, where he constructed fortifications and made forays to suppress the activities of the Donghak rebels in the surrounding provinces. He was noted for implementing strict discipline in his forces to prevent looting and violence against the local civilian population. Reinforcements brought his command to 3800 troops; however, the Japanese had occupied Seoul and Incheon by the end of July with approximately 30,000 troops.

On 27 July, after receiving information about the Battle of Pungdo, and realizing that neither reinforcement nor retreat would be possible by sea, Nie decided to withdraw his forces by a circuitous route to Pyongyang to avoid becoming trapped at Asan. However, on 29 July, a Japanese combat brigade led by General Oshima Yoshimasa attacked his positions in the Battle of Seonghwan. Nie lost approximately 500 men in the engagement, along with his artillery and most of his stores, but the remainder of his forces escaped to Pyongyang. Using his good relations with the local population, he was able to avoid the bulk of the Japanese army during his escape.

On 3 September, after reviewing the defenses of Pyongyang, Nie departed for Tianjin on an unsuccessful mission to request reinforcements. Ordered back to Pyongyang, he was still travelling when he received word of the Chinese defeat at the Battle of Pyongyang. Nie was subsequently in the Battle of Jiuliancheng, where his forces were assigned to the Chinese flank at the village of Hushanqian (虎山), which bore the brunt of the Japanese assault of 24 October. His forces mostly deserted their posts, and Nie escaped with the remnants to Dandong and then to Fenghaungcheng. He burned the city on 30 October rather than to let it fall into Japanese hands, and moved north to block the path of the Japanese advance towards Mukden. He was promoted to the rank of captain general for his efforts. On 12 February 1895, he was withdrawn to Shanhai Pass, the critical point in the route to Beijing, and took no further combat role.

After the war, in 1899 his army was restructured and renamed as Wuwei Front Division, trained by Russian military advisers and equipped with German and Russian weaponry, it was considered the most modern of the Qing armies of the time.

=== Boxer Rebellion ===
In general, Nie was not an active participant in the political intrigues of the Qing court, but was considered politically conservative and supported Empress Dowager Cixi against the Hundred Days' Reform. In his suppression of the Boxer Rebellion, Nie was in an ambiguous position. On one hand, as a general in the Qing army, he pursued a vigorous offensive against rebel guerilla forces in early 1900. Condemned by the pro-Boxer faction of the imperial court, Nie achieved impressive success inflicting large numbers of casualties during the year. On the other hand, he could not accept the invasion of China by the Eight-Nation Alliance so he fought against the Alliance forces. Because Nie's forces killed so many Boxers, it was Dong Fuxiang's Kansu Braves who instead allied with the Boxers to oppose the Seymour Expedition, a multinational force of over 2,000 men, in its march to Beijing.

On 9 July 1900, while personally leading a counterattack against Russian forces under the command of General Anatoly Stessel in the Battle of Tientsin, Nie was fatally wounded when an artillery shell exploded nearby.

In the Nankai District of Tianjin in present-day China, a "Nie Shicheng Martyrs Monument" is located in the area, to General Nie Shichen who died in battle in the Boxer Rebellion at the Battle of Tientsin.
