= Battle of Cixi =

Battle of the Taiping Rebellion

- Part of the Taiping Rebellion (Eastern Expedition)
| Date | September 21, 1862 |
| Location | Cixi, Zhejiang |
| Result | Qing victory |

Belligerents
| Qing dynasty | Taiping Heavenly Kingdom |

Commanders and leaders
| (Qing dynasty) Frederick T. Ward (DOW) | ? |

Strength
| Ever Victorious Army | ? |

Casualties and losses
| ? | ? |

The Battle of Cixi or Battle of Tzeki (慈溪之戰) was an armed engagement in the Taiping Rebellion fought between the Ever Victorious Army of the Qing dynasty and forces of the Taiping Heavenly Kingdom on September 21, 1862, at Cixi. The battle, which was won by the Ever Victorious Army, resulted in the mortal wounding of Frederick Townsend Ward, the American mercenary who founded and commanded the force. Ward's death after the battle led to the succession of Henry Andres Burgevine as commander of the Ever Victorious Army and initiated a period of decline for the force.

== Background ==
When Shanghai was successively attacked by Taiping Rebels in 1862, foreign inhabitants favored removing the potential threat and cooperating with imperial forces; as a result, combined British and French naval troops under the command of Adm. James Hope were involved in military conflict with the Taiping Rebellion. One of the communities inhabited by the rebels was Ningbo, a port and walled city located south of Hangzhou Bay.

The imperial army laid siege to Ningbo's occupiers on 6 May. After a false flag attack on the British ships docked outside Ningbo, the western ships began bombarding the Taiping. They then sent their crews into the city, overpowering rebel forces and turning over Ningbo to the imperial army. With Ningbo secure, Ward's soldiers and the Qing forces began launching attacks in the surrounding areas against the rebels. During this time Cixi was one of the encircling cities ravaged by violence.

== Battle ==
The Ever Victorious Army attacked Cixi on 21 September. As well as being trained in artillery and rifle usage, they were accompanied by the gunboats H.M.S. Hardy and Confucius. Ward led from the front and was hit in the stomach by a musket ball. However, he remained on the battlefield until victory was certain.

== Aftermath ==
Ward died from his wound the day after the battle. The death of Ward started a period of decline for the Ever Victorious Army. Henry Andres Burgevine, another American mercenary and Ward's second-in-command, succeeded Ward as commander, despite initial objections from the British army officer Charles Staveley and the Huai Army commander Li Hongzhang. As commander, Burgevine allowed the soldiers under his command to become unruly, mismanaged the army's finances, and frequently quarreled with his superiors. The resulting disagreements between Burgevine, British officials, Li Hongzhang, and the army's sponsors led to his betrayal of the Qing Dynasty.
