= Occupation of Ningbo =

1861–1862 occupation by the Taiping Heavenly Kingdom

- Part of Taiping Rebellion (Eastern Expedition)
Date	December 9, 1861 – May 10, 1862
Location	Ningbo, Zhejiang, China
Result	Initial Taiping victory: Capture of Ningbo; Eventual Qing victory: Recapture of Ningbo

Belligerents
Qing dynasty France; United Kingdom	Taiping Heavenly Kingdom

Commanders and leaders
(United Kingdom of Great Britain and Ireland) Roderick Dew	Huang Chengzhong; Fan Youzeng

Strength
	60,000

The Occupation of Ningbo was the five-month period in 1861 and 1862 during which the Taiping Heavenly Kingdom successfully occupied the city of Ningbo during the Taiping Rebellion. British and French support eventually allowed the Qing to retake the city.

== Fall of Ningbo ==
In December 1861, the Taiping, having already controlled the hinterlands of Zhejiang for many months, began marching on Ningbo under the command of Huang Chengzhong and Fan Youzeng. When the Taiping neared the city, they were approached by British, French, and American diplomats who attempted to dissuade them from taking the city. Although Western diplomats had previously been successful in warning off the Taipings, they were ultimately only able to extract promises that foreign interests would not be harmed. On December 9, 1861, 60,000 Taiping stormed Ningbo. Despite the fact that the British had been training the local Qing forces, there was no military opposition to the Taiping's capture Ningbo.

== Occupation of Ningbo ==
The capture of Ningbo provided the Taiping with access to the sea and the opportunity to demonstrate that Taiping rule would not harm foreign interests. Initially, foreign reaction to the occupation was positive, even from those who were normally critical of the Taiping, such as Harry Parkes and S. Wells Williams. However, although the Taiping were well-disciplined and took steps conducive to trade, later missives became more negative and the British began to prepare for an eventual retaking of the city by the Qing.

Chen Zhengyue, a bagongsheng and member of the wealthiest household in Ying County, developed a plan to retake Ningbo. He convinced the Qing troops to attempt to retake Ningbo, collaborated with foreign armies to organize an allied action, and provided funding for the expedition.

== Retaking Ningbo ==
On May 10, 1862, Zheng Afu, the personal servant of Frederick E. B. Harvey, and Apak, a coastal pirate who commanded a fleet of 150 small, armed boats, successfully incited a British attack by firing upon HMS Encounter from the Taiping side of the river. This false flag attack killed two British soldiers and caused Roderick Dew, the commander of the Encounter, and the French to begin a full-scale artillery barrage on the Taiping with six gunships. Peasants and pirates then stormed Ningbo. Zheng was personally responsible for directing the torture and summary execution of captives in the aftermath of the operation.

== Aftermath ==
After Ningbo was retaken by the Qing, Apak and his pirate fleet began blockading the river and disrupting trade with the city.
