= Ever Victorious Army =

Chinese Westernized army, 1860 to 1864

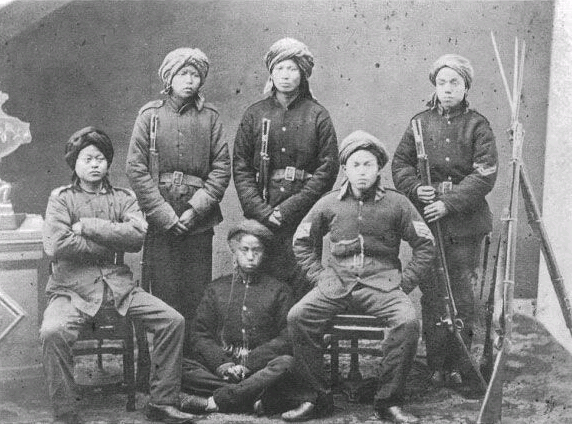
- Members of the Ever Victorious Army in uniform
- Active: 1860–1864
- Country: China
- Allegiance: China
- Type: Shock troops
- Size: 5,000
- Engagements: Nian Rebellion and Taiping Rebellions

Commanders
- Notable commanders: Frederick Townsend Ward; Charles George Gordon; Henry Andres Burgevine; Albert Édouard Le Brethon de Caligny

Ever Victorious Army
- Traditional Chinese: 常勝軍
- Simplified Chinese: 常胜军
Transcriptions
Standard Mandarin
- Hanyu Pinyin: Chángshèngjūn
- Wade–Giles: Ch'ang^{2} Sheng^{4} Chün^{1}

"Ever Victorious Army" (Chinese: 常勝軍; pinyin: Chángshèng Jūn) was a minor imperial army of the Qing dynasty that fought rebels in late-19th-century China. It was directed and trained by Europeans. The Ever Victorious Army fought against the rebels of the Nian and Taiping Rebellions. Though the Army was only active for a few years, from 1860 to 1864, it was instrumental in putting down the Taiping Rebellion. It was the first Chinese army which was trained in European techniques, tactics, and strategy.

== History ==
=== Origins ===
The Ever Victorious Army had its beginnings as a force formed under the command of Frederick Townsend Ward in 1860. The Ever-Victorious Army repulsed another attack on Shanghai in 1862 and helped to defend other treaty ports such as Ningbo. They also aided imperial troops in reconquering Taiping strongholds along the Yangtze River. Qing forces were reorganised under the command of Zeng Guofan, Zuo Zongtang and Li Hongzhang, and the Qing reconquest began in earnest. By early 1864, Qing control in most areas was reestablished. Townsend Ward introduced what were for the time radical ideas involving force structure, training, discipline, and weaponry (though there are historians who question whether his lieutenant and confidant Li Hongzhang was also responsible for some of the then-unique ideas that forged the Ever Victorious Army). He believed in a more flexible command structure, and that well trained, disciplined, mobile units could defeat larger forces lacking these qualities. Following several early victories, the Qing dynasty officially bestowed the title "Ever Victorious Army" on the corps in March 1862.

=== Composition ===
The new force originally comprised about 200 mostly European mercenaries, enlisted in the Shanghai area from sailors, deserters and adventurers. Many were dismissed in the summer of 1861, but the remainder became the officers of 1,200 Chinese soldiers recruited by Ward in and around Songjiang (romanized at the time as "Sungkiang"). The Chinese troops were increased to 3,000 by May 1862, all equipped with Western firearms and equipment by the British authorities in Shanghai. Throughout its four-year existence the Ever Victorious Army was mainly to operate within a thirty-mile radius of Shanghai.

=== Tactics ===
The Ever Victorious Army numbered around 5,000 soldiers at its height. It was the first Chinese army to incorporate western style training and tactics, modern weaponry, and most important, the concept of light infantry units which could move faster than their opponents.

=== Change in command ===
Following Ward's death in September 1862 after the Battle of Cixi, command of the Ever Victorious Army passed, after a short period of time, to Charles George Gordon, known as "Chinese" Gordon. Under Gordon the Ever Victorious Army, in collaboration with the Chinese Imperial forces, would fight some of the final and decisive battles that ended the Taiping Rebellion. Li Hongzhang said of Gordon: "What a sight it is for tired eyes, what an elixir for a weary heart to watch this Englishman fight. Planning by day, executing by night, planning by night, executing by day; he is a glorious fellow."

=== Structure ===
The infantry of the Ever Victorious Army was organised into battalions, usually referred to during the period of Gordon's command as regiments. By 1864 there were six regiments numbering between 250 and 650 men. Each comprised six companies, with a nominal establishment of two foreign officers, seven Chinese non-commissioned officers and up to 80 Chinese privates. There was one Chinese interpreter per regiment, although commands were given exclusively in English which had to be learnt by rote.

==== Bodyguard ====
Ward created a separate Bodyguard of Filipinos numbering 200–300. Under Gordon this force comprised a company of foreigners (including both Africans and Europeans) and 100 handpicked Chinese soldiers.

==== Artillery ====
By 1863 the Ever Victorious Army included a separate artillery arm, comprising six batteries of Heavy and Light Artillery. Each had an establishment of five foreign officers, 19 Chinese non-commissioned officers and 120–150 Chinese gunners.

==== River-boat fleet ====
Ward bought and chartered a flotilla of about twelve armed paddle steamers, supported by 30–50 Chinese gunboats. Under Gordon this small navy dwindled to two steamers, subsequently increased to six. Both steamers and gunboats were fitted with 9- or 12-pounder bow-guns. The largest vessel was the Hyson, which was 90 feet long and carried a 32-pounder gun as well as a 12-pounder howitzer.

=== Uniforms ===
According to the North China Herald, the Bodyguard wore blue uniforms with scarlet facings and green shoulder straps bearing unit identification in Chinese characters. Artillerymen wore light blue uniforms with red facings and trouser stripes. Infantry wore dark green in winter dress with red facings and shoulder straps in regimental colours. In summer all branches wore white uniforms with scarlet facings. All units wore green turbans.

=== End of the Ever Victorious Army ===
Gordon's stringent discipline led to an increase in desertions and several small scale mutinies. Accordingly, by June 1863 the force had declined in numbers to 1,700 men. In the final year of its existence, the Ever Victorious Army was largely recruited from former Taiping rebels who had been taken prisoner and persuaded to change sides. By April 1864 the Army had become less effective and had suffered several setbacks. It was disbanded in May 1864 with 104 foreign officers and 2,288 Chinese soldiers being paid off. The bulk of the artillery and some infantry was transferred to the Chinese Imperial forces.

== Literary allusions ==
Robert Jordan named the Seanchan army in his Wheel of Time fantasy series after the Ever Victorious Army.

Ward turns up in George MacDonald Fraser's fictional The Flashman Papers series novel Flashman and the Dragon as a Yangtze opium smuggler (apocryphal) and as the leader of the embryonic Ever Victorious Army.

In the time-travel novel This Is How You Lose the Time War by Amal El-Mohtar and Max Gladstone, the character Red refers to Blue and the Ever Victorious Army burning down a palace.
