= Stenz =

Stenz is a surname of German origin, derived from the name Stanislav. Notable people with the surname include:

- Georg Maria Stenz (1869–1928), German missionary
- Markus Stenz (born 1965), German conductor
