= Juye Incident =

1897 murders of Catholic missionaries in China

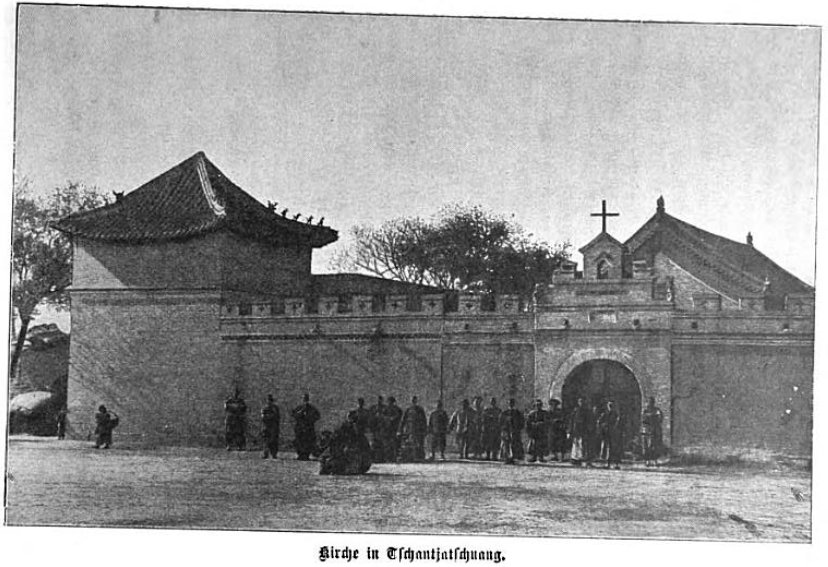
- Mission compound in Zhangjia Village, site of the Juye Incident
- Native name: Chinese: 曹州敎案 or 鉅野敎案; pinyin: Cáozhōu Jiào'àn or Jùyě Jiào'àn
- Date: November 1, 1897 – November 2, 1897
- Location: Zhangjia Village, Juye, Shandong, Qing China; 35.547°N 115.992°E
- Cause: Missionary-local tensions / disputes
- Participants: 3 German missionaries, 20 to 30 local villagers
- Outcome: 2 missionaries killed, German occupation of Jiaozhou, Scramble for China

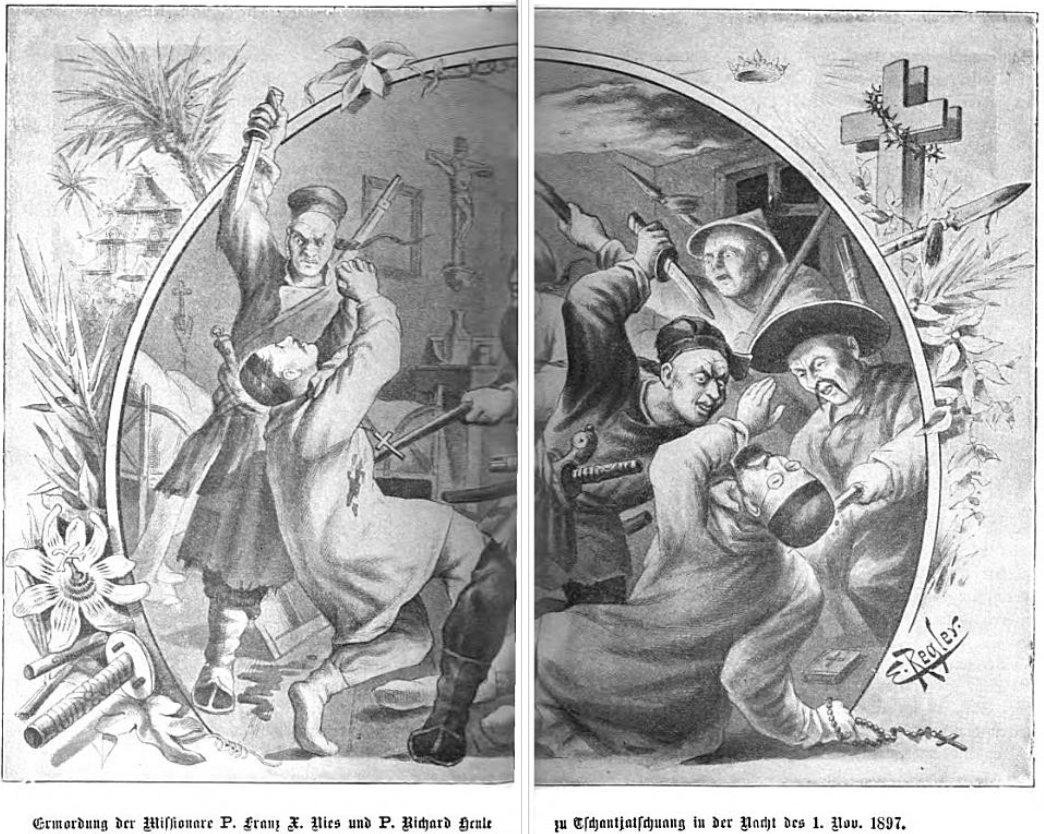
Contemporary German depiction of the Juye Incident.

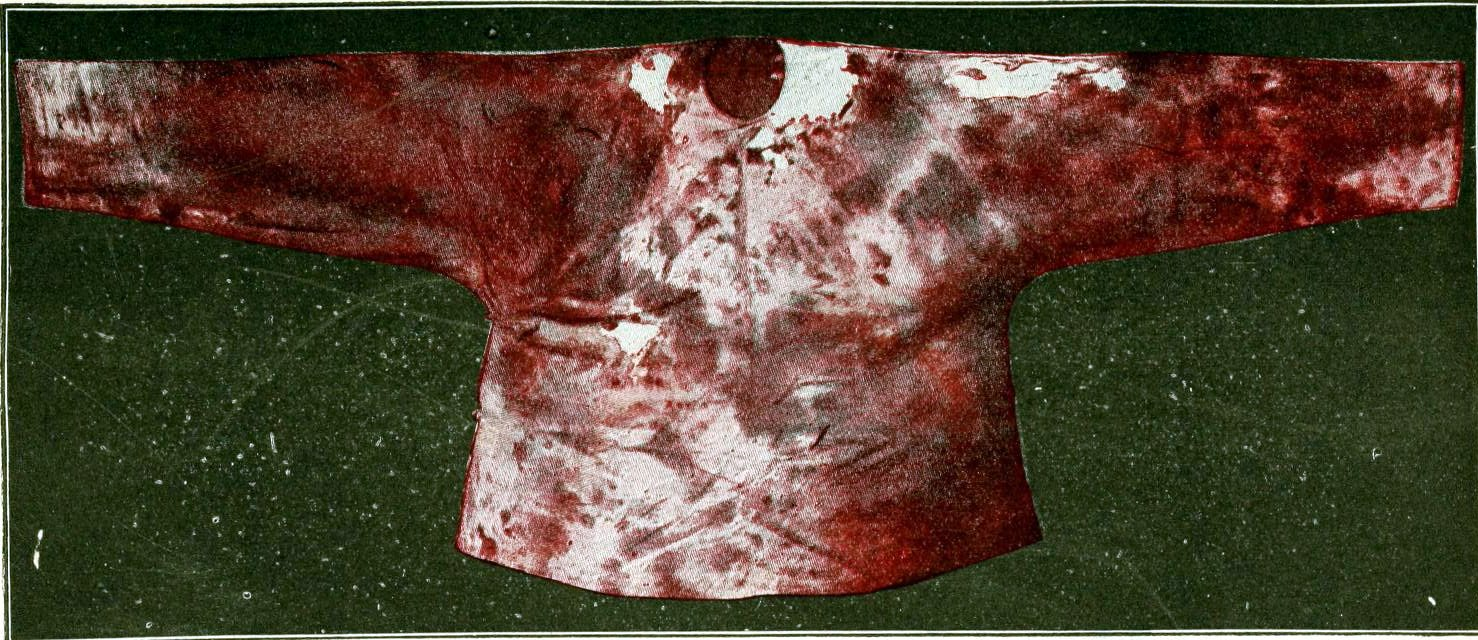
Bloodstained undershirt of Franz Xaver Nies.

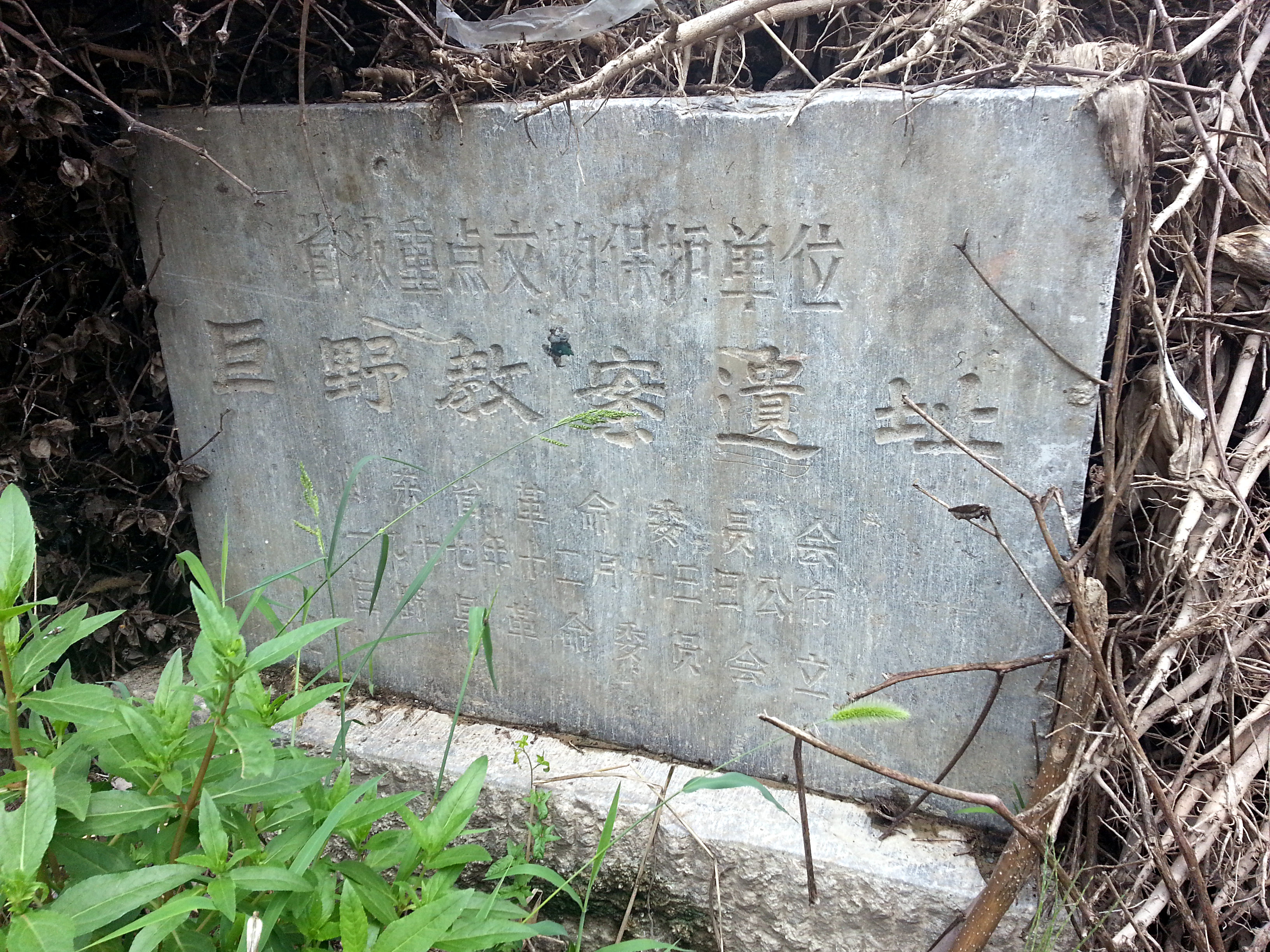
Roadside marker near the site of the incident.

Juye Incident (Chinese: 鉅野敎案; pinyin: Jùyě Jiào'àn, German: Juye Vorfall) or Caozhou Incident (Chinese: 曹州敎案; pinyin: Cáozhōu Jiào'àn) refers to the killing of two German Catholic missionaries, Richard Henle and Franz Xaver Nies, of the Society of the Divine Word, in Juye County Shandong Province, Qing China in the night of 1–2 November 1897 (All Saints' Day to All Souls' Day). The likely target of the attack, the local resident missionary Georg Maria Stenz, survived unharmed. The German Empire used the Juye Incident as a pretext for occupying territory in China which prompted other foreign powers to follow suit.

== Location ==
The mission compound where the incident took place was located in Zhang Jia Village (simplified Chinese: 张家庄; traditional Chinese: 張家莊; pinyin: Zhāng Jiā Zhuāng, spelled "Tshantyachuang" in writings by Georg M. Stenz, modern name: Mopan Zhang Village, simplified Chinese: 磨盘张庄; traditional Chinese: 磨盤張莊; pinyin: Mòpán Zhāng Zhuāng), about 10 km northeast of the town of Juye and about 25 km northwest of the city of Jining. The compound had been established in 1887 as part of the Society of the Divine Word's expansion into Southern Shandong that had started in 1882. Georg M. Stenz took up his residence in the mission compound during the autumn of 1896. In the year after the incident, the compound was again raided by a band of armed locals. The assault formed part of the broader wave of anti-missionary violence that preceded the Boxer movement. After the Boxer Rebellion, the compound was restored to a size of 1,807 square meters for the church building plus an additional 558 square meters for a chapel, the living quarters, stables, storage, and a gatehouse. The remains of the compound were demolished during the Cultural Revolution in 1966 leaving a water well as the only remnant on the site.

== Causes ==
It has not been established who committed the killings, although it is most commonly assumed that the attack was launched by members of the Big Swords Society, a decentralized network of peasant groups formed for the purpose of self-defense against local threats, e.g., from bandits. Like the identities of the perpetrators, their specific motivations also remain unknown. However, it is clear that missionaries of the Society of the Divine Word, including Henle and Stenz, had gotten themselves involved in a number of local conflicts, which included indiscriminately taking the side of Chinese Christians who were parties to the disputes. Hence, it is possible that the killings were motivated by such local grievances. This was certainly the opinion of Stenz, who blamed the attack on the warden of a neighboring village (Cao Jia Zhuang, spelled "Tsaotyachuang" by Stenz and located about 10 km to the south of Zhang Jia Village). Stenz had denied the warden admission to the Catholic church as he had been accused of stealing an ox from a neighboring village. Stenz had, however, allowed comparatively wealthy families from the same village to convert to Catholicism. He believed that the attack was motivated by the ensuing dispute between the warden and the converts who had refused to pay for local temple feasts on the basis of their newly-adopted religion.

== Attack ==
Georg M. Stenz was the priest ("rector") stationed in Zhang Jia Village and the other two missionaries, Richard Henle and Franz Xaver Nies, had come to visit him there. Stenz describes the events of the incident as follows: Before they went to bed towards midnight, the missionaries had practiced the Requiem Mass ending with the song Miseremini mei ("Have pity on me") for the following All Souls' Day. Stenz had given his room to his guests for the night and had himself moved into a vacant small porter's room near the gate. Believing the area to be peaceful, the missionaries did not take any precautions and Stenz even left the door to his room unlocked. A band of twenty to thirty armed men invaded the mission compound shortly after the missionaries had gone to bed. They used force to break the door to the room where Henle and Nies were staying and killed the two missionaries inside. The attackers searched for Stenz in different parts of the compound, but could not find him as they mistakenly believed the porter's room was occupied by the porter. Hence, they only placed a guard in front of the room and did not enter it. They retreated when the local Chinese Christians arrived at the scene to help. Both victims were found to have suffered numerous wounds from stabbing and both were dead while it was still shortly before midnight.

== Investigation ==
The Chinese authorities portrayed the attack on the mission station as an act of robbery - despite the mismatch between the lethal violence used and the observation that only a few clothing items had been taken from Stenz's quarters. A total of about 50 people were arrested by the authorities and seven of the arrested were convicted for the attack. Two were sentenced to death and beheaded; the other five were sentenced to life in prison. Stenz himself believed that none of the convicted were guilty of the attack.

== Impact ==
Less than two weeks after the Juye Incident, the German Empire used the murders of the missionaries as a pretext to seize Jiaozhou Bay on Shandong's southern coast. Under German threats, the Qing government was also forced to remove many Shandong officials (including Shandong governor Li Bingheng) from their posts and to build three Catholic churches in the area (in Jining, Caozhou, and Juye) at its own expense. The mission that had been attacked also received 3,000 taels of silver in compensation for stolen or damaged property, and received the right to construct seven fortified residences in the area, also at government expense. This settlement strengthened missionary work in southern Shandong province and was part of the events that led to the Boxer Uprising (1899–1900), a movement directed against the Christian and foreign presence in northern China. Imitating Germany, other powers (Russia, Britain, France, and Japan) began a "Scramble for China" (or "scramble for concessions") to secure their own spheres of influence in China.

Historian Paul Cohen has called the Juye incident "the opening wedge in a process of greatly intensified imperialist activity in China" and Joseph W. Esherick comments that the Juye killings "set off a chain of events which radically altered the course of Chinese history."

== Bibliography ==
- Clark, Anthony E. (2011), China's Saints: Catholic Martyrdom During the Qing (1644–1911), Lexington Books.
- Cohen, Paul (1997), History in Three Keys: The Boxers as Event, Experience, and Myth, New York: Columbia University Press, ISBN 0-231-10651-3.
- Esherick, Joseph W. (1987), The Origins of the Boxer Uprising, Berkeley and Los Angeles: University of California Press, ISBN 0-520-06459-3.
- Stenz, Georg Maria (1902), In der Heimat des Konfuzius: Skizzen, Bilder und Erlebnisse aus Schantung, Druck und Verlag der Missionsdruckerei
- Stenz, Georg Maria (1915), Life of Father Richard Henle, S.V.D. missionary in China : assassinated November 1, 1897, Techny, IL: Mission Press, S.V.D.
- Tiedemann, R. G. (2007a), "The Church Militant: Armed Conflicts between Christians and Boxers in North China", in Robert Bickers; R.G. Tiedemann (eds.), The Boxers, China, and the World, Plymouth: Rowman & Littlefield, pp. 17–41, ISBN 978-0-7425-5395-8.
