= Open Door Policy =

US policy of equal trade with China

- 1899–1949
Spheres of influence in China	Chinese Communist Revolution
- Old China proposes to give a worlds fair. China standing on a platform saying China's World's Fair welcomes the world through a door possibly representing the open door policy.
- Duration: 50 years
- Leader: John Hay (Architect)
- President(s): William McKinley; Theodore Roosevelt
- Key events: September 6, 1899: First Note issued * July 3, 1900: Second Note issued * 1900: Boxer Rebellion * 1922: Nine-Power Treaty

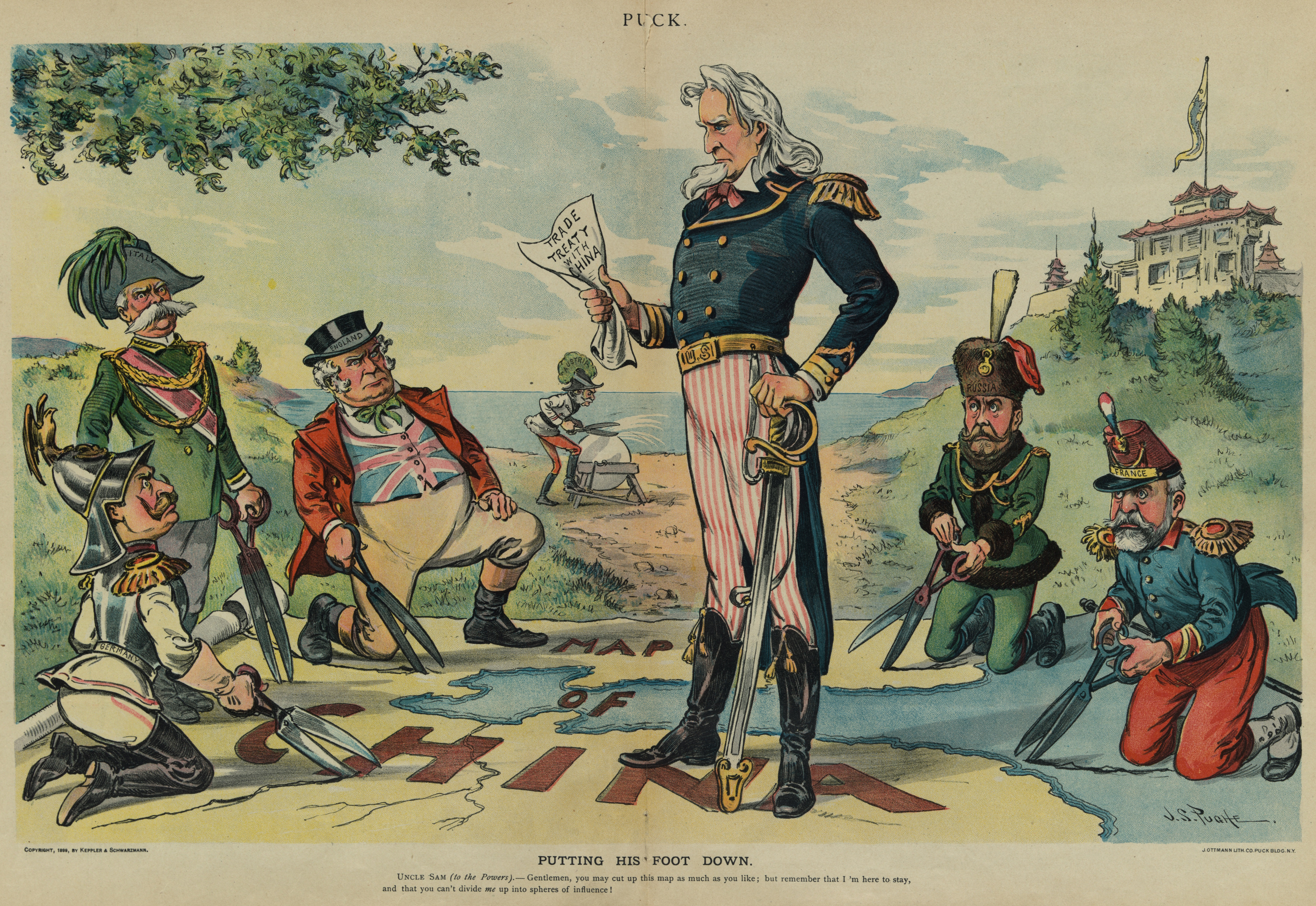
US cartoon from 1899: Uncle Sam (center, representing the United States) demanding Open Door access to trade with China while European powers plan to cut it up for themselves. From left to right: Kaiser Wilhelm II (Germany), King Umberto I (Italy), John Bull (Britain), Tsar Nicholas II (Russia) and President Émile Loubet (France). Emperor Franz Joseph I (Austria) is in the back.

The Open Door Policy (Chinese: 門戶開放政策) was the United States diplomatic policy established in the late 19th and early 20th century that called for a system of equal trade and investment and to guarantee the territorial integrity of Qing China. The policy was created in U.S. Secretary of State John Hay's Open Door Note, dated September 6, 1899, and circulated to the major European powers. In order to prevent the "carving of China like a melon", as they were doing in Africa, the Note asked the powers to keep China open to trade with all countries on an equal basis and called upon all powers, within their spheres of influence to refrain from interfering with any treaty port or any vested interest, to permit Chinese authorities to collect tariffs on an equal basis, and to show no favors to their own nationals in the matter of harbor dues or railroad charges. The policy was accepted only grudgingly, if at all, by the major powers, and it had no legal standing or enforcement mechanism. In July 1900, as the powers contemplated intervention to put down the violently anti-foreign Boxer uprising, Hay circulated a Second Open Door Note affirming the principles. Over the next decades, American policy-makers and national figures continued to refer to the Open Door Policy as a basic doctrine, and Chinese diplomats appealed to it as they sought American support, but critics pointed out that the policy had little practical effect.

The term "Open Door" also describes the economic policy initiated by Deng Xiaoping in 1978 to open China to foreign businesses that wanted to invest in the country. The policy set into motion the economic transformation of China. In the 20th and 21st centuries, scholars such as Christopher Layne in the neorealist school have generalized the use of the term to applications in 'political' open door policies and 'economic' open door policies of nations in general, which interact on a global or international basis.

== Background ==
The theory of the Open Door Policy originated with British commercial practice, as reflected in treaties concluded with the Qing dynasty China after the First Opium War (1839–1842) which included most favored nation provisions designed to keep any one nation from gaining an advantage. The concept was seen at the Berlin Conference of 1885, which declared that no power could levy preferential duties in the Congo. As a concept and policy, the Open Door Policy was a principle that was never formally adopted via treaty or international law. It was invoked or alluded to but never enforced as such. The policy collapsed in 1931 when the Japanese seized and kept Manchuria, despite international disapproval. Technically, the term Open Door Policy is applicable only before the founding of the People's Republic of China in 1949. After Deng Xiaoping took power in 1978, the term referred to China's policy of opening up to foreign business that wanted to invest in the country, which set into motion the economic transformation of modern China.

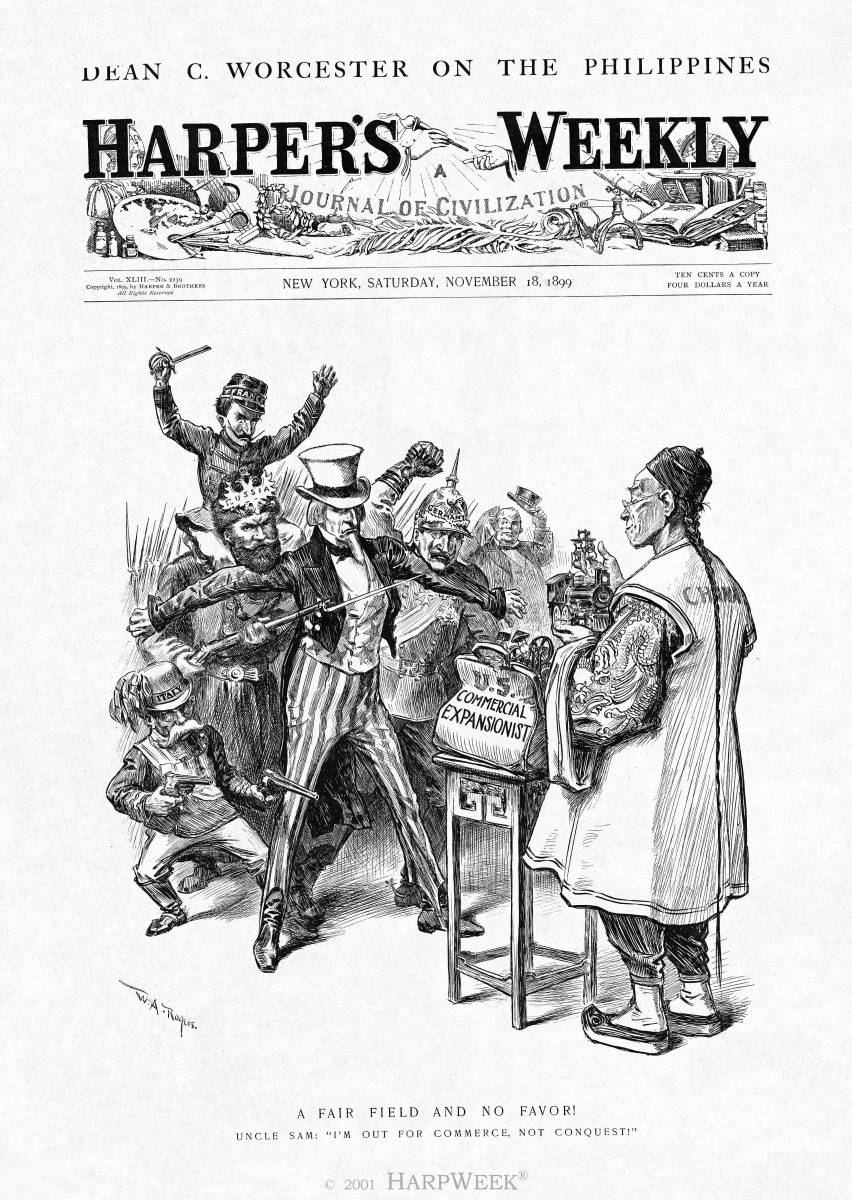
Uncle Sam (United States) rejects force and violence and ask "fair field and no favor," equal opportunity for all trading nations to enter the China market peacefully, which became the Open Door Policy. Editorial cartoon by William A. Rogers in Harper's Magazine (New York) November 18, 1899.

== History ==
=== Formation of policy ===
With its defeat in the First Sino-Japanese War (1894–1895), China faced an imminent threat of being partitioned and colonized by imperial powers with a presence in China (which included France, Germany, Britain, Italy, Japan, and Russia). After winning the Spanish–American War of 1898, with the newly acquired territory of the Philippine Islands, the United States increased its Asian presence and expected to further its commercial and political interests in China. It felt threatened by other powers' much larger spheres of influence in China and worried that it might lose access to the Chinese market if it were to be partitioned. As a response, William Woodville Rockhill formulated the Open Door Policy to safeguard American business opportunities and other interests in China. On September 6, 1899, U.S. Secretary of State John Hay sent notes to the major powers (France, Germany, Britain, Italy, Japan, and Russia) to ask them to declare formally that they would uphold Chinese territorial and administrative integrity and they would not interfere with the free use of the treaty ports in their spheres of influence in China. The Open Door Policy stated that all nations, including the United States, could enjoy equal access to the Chinese market. Hay's logic was that American economic power would then be able to dominate the Chinese market and fend off other foreign competitors.

In reply, each country tried to evade Hay's request by taking the position that it could not commit itself until the other nations had complied. However, by July 1900, Hay announced that each of the powers had granted its consent in principle. Although treaties after 1900 referred to the Open Door Policy, competition continued abated among the various powers for special concessions within China for railroad rights, mining rights, loans, foreign trade ports, and so forth.

On October 6, 1900, Britain and Germany signed the Yangtze Agreement to oppose the partition of China into spheres of influence. The agreement, signed by Lord Salisbury and Ambassador Paul von Hatzfeldt, was an endorsement of the Open Door Policy. The Germans supported it because a partition of China would limit Germany to a small trading market, instead of all of China.

=== Subsequent development ===
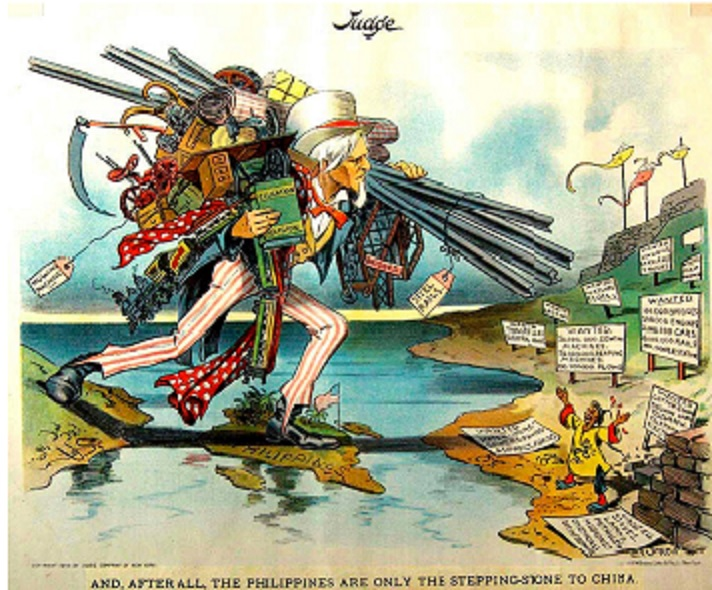
Stepping stone to trade to huge China Market, from Judge March 11, 1900

The policy built popular sympathy for China and raised hopes for a vast "China market" and American influence in China's development. The effect of the policy was partly diplomatic, but it also reflected what the historian Michael Hunt calls a "paternalistic vision" of "defending and reforming China." This vision defined China in terms of two struggles, first, a Chinese domestic struggle between progressive reform and feudal inertia, and the second an international struggle which pitted the "selfish imperialism" of Britain, Russia, and Japan against the supposedly benevolent policies of the United States. Over the next decades, American diplomats, missionaries, and businessmen took a special interest in China, many of them envisioning that China would follow the American example.

However these dreams proved difficult to realize. American investments, while considerable, did not reach major proportions; the Open Door policy could not protect China against Japanese interference, first the Manchurian Incident of 1931, then the Second Sino-Japanese War (1937–1945), and Chinese leaders, while willing to seek American aid, were not willing to play the passive role that the Open Door implied.

In 1902, the U.S. government protested that the Russian incursion into Manchuria after the Boxer Rebellion was a violation of the Open Door Policy. When Japan replaced Russia in southern Manchuria after the Russo-Japanese War (1904–1905) the Japanese and American governments pledged to maintain a policy of equality in Manchuria. In 1905–1907 Japan made overtures to enlarge its sphere of influence to include Fujian. Japan was trying to obtain French loans and also avoid the Open Door Policy. Paris provided loans on condition that Japan respect the Open Door principles and not violate China's territorial integrity.

In finance, American efforts to preserve the Open Door Policy led in 1909 to the formation of an international banking consortium through which all Chinese railroad loans agreed in 1917 to another exchange of notes between the United States and Japan. There were renewed assurances that the Open Door Policy would be respected, but the United States would recognize Japan's special interests in China (the Lansing–Ishii Agreement). The Open Door Policy had been further weakened by a series of secret treaties in 1917 between Japan and the Allied Triple Entente that promised Japan the German possessions in China after the successful conclusion of World War I. The subsequent realization of the promise in the 1919 Versailles Treaty angered the Chinese public and sparked the protest known as the May Fourth Movement. The Nine-Power Treaty, signed in 1922, expressly reaffirmed the Open Door Policy. In 1949, the United States State Department issued the China White Paper, a selection of official documents on United States-China relations, 1900–1949. The introductory "Letter of Transmittal," signed by Secretary of State Dean Acheson, asserted that the United States policy had consistently maintained fundamental principles, "which include the doctrine of the Open Door...."

Since the policy effectively hindered Chinese sovereignty, the government of the Republic of China endeavored to revise the related treaties with foreign powers in the 1920s and 1930s. However, only after the conclusion of World War II would China manage to regain its full sovereignty.

=== In modern China ===
The term "Open Door Policy" also refers to the economic policy initiated in China in the late 1970s to expand foreign trade and investment. Mao Zedong's handpicked successor initiated a transitional period and introduced his Open Door policy in 1977. This policy laid the groundwork for Deng Xiaoping's reforms and were incorporated in 1987 under the "Four Modernizations" which expanded foreign investment, agriculture, industry, science and technology, and national defense. Special Economic Zones (SEZ) were set up in 1980 in his belief that to modernize China's industry and boost its economy, he needed to welcome foreign direct investment. Chinese economic policy then shifted to encouraging and supporting foreign trade and investment. It was the turning point in China's economic fortune, which started its way on the path to becoming 'The World's Factory'.

Four SEZs were initially set up in 1980: Shenzhen, Zhuhai and Shantou in Guangdong, and Xiamen in Fujian. The SEZs were strategically located near Hong Kong, Macau, and Taiwan but with a favorable tax regime and low wages to attract capital and business from these Chinese communities. Shenzhen was the first to be established and showed the most rapid growth, averaging a very high growth rate of 40% per annum between 1981 and 1993, compared to the average GDP growth of 9.8% for the country as a whole. Other SEZs were set up in other parts of China.

In 1978, China was ranked 32nd in the world in export volume, but by 1989, it had doubled its world trade and became the 13th exporter. Between 1978 and 1990, the average annual rate of trade expansion was above 15 percent, and a high rate of growth continued for the next decade. In 1978, its exports in the world market share was negligible and in 1998, it still had less than 2%, but by 2010, it had a world market share of 10.4% according to the World Trade Organization (WTO), with merchandise export sales of more than $1.5 trillion, the highest in the world. In 2013, China overtook the United States and became the world's biggest trading nation in goods, with a total for imports and exports valued at US$4.16 trillion for the year.

On 21 July 2020, Chinese Communist Party general secretary Xi Jinping made a speech to a group of public and private business leaders at the entrepreneur forum in Beijing. Xi emphasized that "We must gradually form a new development pattern with the domestic internal circulation as the main body and the domestic and international dual circulations mutually promoting each other." Since then "internal circulation" became a hot word in China.

== Applications in 20th and 21st centuries ==
Scholars such as Christopher Layne in the neorealist school have generalized the use of the term to applications in 'political' open door policies and 'economic' open door policies of nations in general, which interact on a global or international basis.

William Appleman Williams, considered as the foremost member of the "Wisconsin School" of diplomatic history, departed from the mainstream of U.S. historiography in the 1950s by arguing that the United States was more responsible for the Cold War than the Soviet Union by expanding as an empire. Pivoting the history of American diplomacy on the Open Door Policy, Williams described the policy as "America's version of the liberal policy of informal empire or free trade imperialism." That was the central thesis in his book, The Tragedy of American Diplomacy.

== See also ==
- New Imperialism § China
- China-United States relations
- Scramble for China
- Russian invasion of Manchuria
- Economic history of China before 1912
- Economic history of China (1912–1949)
- Iraq Petroleum Company

== References and further reading ==
- Hayford, Charles W. (1996), "The Open Door Raj: Chinese-American Cultural Relations, 1900–1945", in Cohen, Warren (ed.), Pacific Passage" The Study of American-East Asian Relations on the Eve of the Twenty-first Century, New York: Columbia University Press, pp. 139–162, ISBN 978-0-231-10406-7 State-of-the-field essay.
- Hu, Shizhang (1995). Stanley K. Hornbeck and the Open Door Policy, 1919–1937. Greenwood Press. ISBN 0-313-29394-5.
- Hunt, Michael H. (1973). Frontier Defense and the Open Door: Manchuria in Chinese-American Relations, 1895–1911. New Haven: Yale University Press. ISBN 0-300-01616-6.
- ———— (1983). The Making of a Special Relationship: The United States and China to 1914. New York: Columbia University Press. ISBN 0-231-05516-1.
- Israel, Jerry (1971). Progressivism and the Open Door: America and China, 1905–1921. Pittsburgh: University of Pittsburgh Press. ISBN 0-8229-3210-5.
- Lawrence, Mark Atwood/ "Open Door Policy", Encyclopedia of American Foreign Policy, (online).
- McKee, Delber (1977). Chinese Exclusion Versus the Open Door Policy, 1900–1906: Clashes over China Policy in the Roosevelt Era. Wayne State Univ Press. ISBN 0-8143-1565-8.
- McFarland, Philip. John Hay, Friend of Giants: The Man and Life Connecting Abraham Lincoln, Mark Twain, Henry James, and Theodore Roosevelt (2017).
- Moore, Lawrence. Defining and Defending the Open Door Policy: Theodore Roosevelt and China, 1901–1909 (2017)
- Otte, Thomas G. (2007). The China question: great power rivalry and British isolation, 1894–1905. Oxford University Press. ISBN 978-0-19-921109-8.
- Phillips, Steven (2009). "Open Door Policy". Berkshire Encyclopedia of China. Vol. 4. Great Barrington, MA: Berkshire Publishing. pp. 1647–1651.
- Sugita, Yoneyuki, "The Rise of an American Principle in China: A Reinterpretation of the First Open Door Notes toward China" in Richard J. Jensen, Jon Thares Davidann, and Yoneyuki Sugita, eds. Trans-Pacific relations: America, Europe, and Asia in the twentieth century (Greenwood, 2003) pp 3–20
- Taliaferro, John. All the Great Prizes: The Life of John Hay, from Lincoln to Roosevelt (2014) pp 344–542.
- United States Department of State (1949). The China White Paper, August 1949. Stanford, Calif.: Reprinted: Stanford University Press.
- Young, Marilyn (1972). "The Quest for Empire". In May, Ernest R.; Thomson, James C. (eds.). American-East Asian Relations: A Survey. pp. 131–156. State-of-the-field essay.
