= Georg Maria Stenz =

German missionary

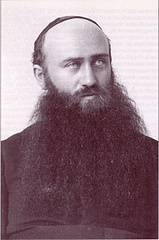
- Georg Maria Stenz
- Born: 22 November 1869; Horhausen, Westerwald
- Died: 23 April 1928 (aged 58); Techny, Illinois, US
- Other names: Chinese: 薛田资; pinyin: Xuē Tiánzī
- Occupation: missionary in Shandong
- Years active: 1893 to 1927
- Organization: Society of the Divine Word
- Known for: Juye incident, Jietou incident

Signature
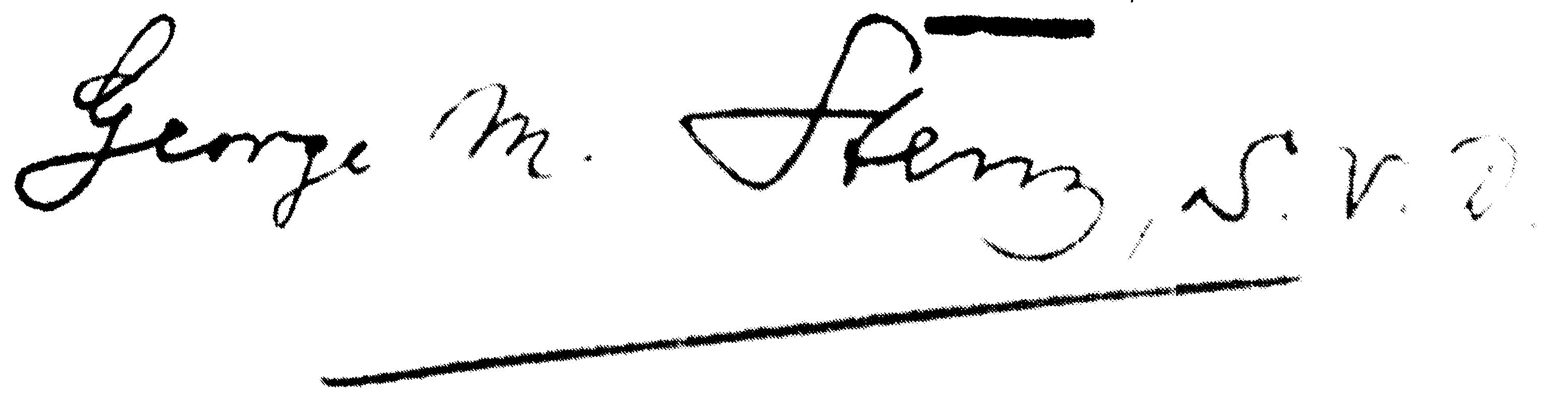

Georg Maria Stenz (Chinese: 薛田资; pinyin: Xuē Tiánzī, 22 November 1869 – 23 April 1928) was a Catholic missionary of the Society of the Divine Word in Shandong during the period from 1893 to 1927. He was involved in two major incidents where force was used against Catholic missionaries in Shandong, the Juye incident and the Jietou incident. The Juye incident (1897) was an attack on Stenz's mission station in Zhang Jia Village in which two German missionaries were killed. Stenz, the likely target of the attack, managed to hide and escaped unharmed. The incident was used by the German Empire to justify the occupation of Qingdao and was a contributing factor in the development of the Boxer Rebellion.. In the Jietou incident, Stenz and a group of Chinese Christians were mistreated and held prisoner in the village of Jietou (Chinese: 街头镇; pinyin: Jiētóu zhèn, Rizhao) for three days (8–11 November 1898) resulting in German military intervention and compensation claims.

== Early life ==
Born in Horhausen, Westerwald, Georg Stenz was the son of the elementary school teacher Jacob Stenz and his wife Maria (née Dasbach). He was the oldest of 7 children (2 boys and 5 girls) of which only he and his sister Maria (born 1878) lived to adulthood. He attended the elementary school in Horhausen, where his father was a teacher from 1875 to 1880. From 1880 to the autumn of 1881, he was given private lessons by a chaplain in Horhausen, possibly for health reasons. In the autumn of 1881, he entered the second year (quinta) of a secondary school (gymnasium) in Montabaur where he lived in a residence (konvikt) of the Diocese of Limburg. In February 1887, he requested admission to the mission Divine Word Missionaries in Style, where he continued his education from 25 April 1887, onwards in the missionaries' secondary school ("Styler Lyzeum"). He graduated from the Styler Lyzeum (matura) after two years. Since the degree from the Styler Lyzeum was not recognized by the German state, he also gained a high-school diploma from the Montabaur secondary school in 1889 as an external student. He became a novice and studied theology at the St. Gabriel mission house of the Divine Word Missionaries in Maria Enzersdorf to the southwest of Vienna. He made his temporary vows at St. Gabriel on 21 November 1891, and was ordained as a priest in the same place on 25 June 1893. He was sent on his mission to China on 17 September 1893, together with Joseph Hesser (1867-1920) and Josef Schneider (1867-1896) who had been ordained as priests with him. The three traveled to Genoa via Cologne, Basel, Luzern, and Milan. On 25 September 1893, the three missionaries boarded the steamship Bayern of the shipping company Norddeutscher Lloyd in Genoa. After a voyage via Naples, Port Said, Suez, Aden, and Colombo, they arrived in Hong Kong on 25 October. After a few days' stay in Hong Kong, Stenz traveled on the Bayern to Shanghai, where he arrived on 29 October 1893.

== Activities as a missionary ==
After his arrival in Shandong, Georg Stenz first stayed in the headquarters of the Society of the Divine Word in Shandong to learn Chinese. At the time, the headquarters was located in the town of Puoli (郭里镇), about 30 km southeast of the city of Jining. Stenz stayed there until early 1895, when he was sent to work as an assistant to Franz Xaver Nies in the mission station at Jiaxiang (嘉祥镇), a town about 25 km to the west of Jining.

In the autumn of 1896, Stenz was promoted to rector and took up his residence in the mission compound at Zhang Jia Village (张家庄). His direct superior (dean) was Richard Henle. During his tenure in Zhang Jia Village, Stenz involved himself in a number of local conflicts: He interfered in lawsuits to support claims by Chinese Christians - possibly without much consideration of their merit - as was common practice among Catholic missionaries in China. He also sought punishments for alleged insults to the church. Furthermore, by his own account, Stenz inserted himself into a local conflict that centered on the headman of the nearby village of Caojiazhuang, who had been accused of stealing an ox from a neighboring town. Stenz prohibited the headman from joining the Catholic church while admitting the wealthiest families in his village. Citing their new religion, the wealthy converts withdrew their customary financial support for the village's traditional religious festivals which fueled further conflict and led to complaints to local officials. Stenz suspected that the headman was responsible for the deadly attack on his mission compound in the Juye Incident during the night of 1–2 November 1897. Negative perceptions of Stenz among the local community are reflected in an oral tradition that accuses him of serial rape, although the historical accuracy of these claims has not been established.

In the autumn of 1898, i.e., one year after the Juye Incident, Stenz was relocated and given responsibility for the mission in the areas of Rizhao and Zhucheng. Stenz traveled from Qingdao to Rizhao by sea on November 1, 1898, and embarked on a tour of the area. Seven days later, on November 8, he arrived in Jiechuang near the village of Jietou, about 35 km northwest of Rizhao. There he was held captive and mistreated in the Jietou Incident until the magistrate of Rhizhao intervened and had him freed around noon on 11 November. After the incident, Stenz was treated in a hospital in Qingdao. In the spring of 1899, Stenz participated in a German punitive expedition that was dispatched from Qingdao to Rizhao to avenge an attack on three Germans (a lieutenant, a mining engineer, and an interpreter). On 16 June 1899, a German newspaper (Kölnische Volkszeitung) ran a story that depicted life in the German colony of Qingdao in a negative light and blamed, e.g., German soldiers for lack of discipline, drunkenness, sexual harassment of Chinese girls, and violent abuse of the local Chinese population. Although the article was published anonymously, Stenz was suspected to be the author. As a consequence, the Vicar Apostolic of Southern Shandong, Johann Baptist von Anzer moved Stenz from Qingdao to Jining in early 1900 and forbade him to write. On 25 April 1900, Stenz left Jining to travel to Europe for medical treatment and recuperation. However, he may have been sent away because his presence was putting a strain on the relationship between the mission and the German authorities in Qingdao. While in Europe, Stenz participated in a push to remove Bishop Anzer from office. Anzer traveled to Rome to defend himself, but died there on 24 November 1903, before his case could be resolved. Stenz returned to Shandong on 20 May 1904. After his return, he continued to participate in several missionary education activities for more than 20 years.

== Death ==
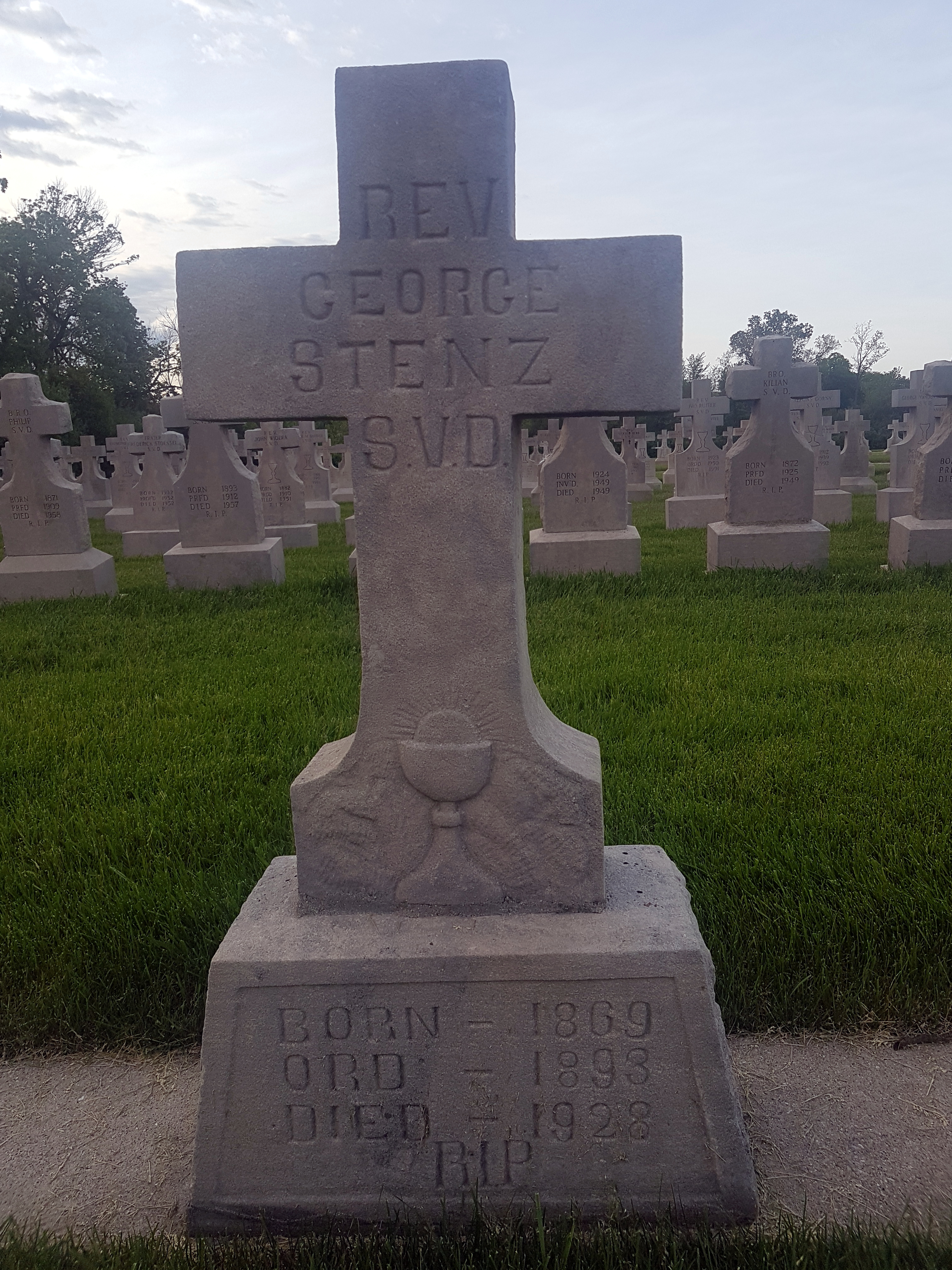
Cross marking the grave of Georg Maria Stenz on the cemetery of the Society of the Divine Word in Techny, Illinois

Stenz suffered a stroke on 17 March 1927 that deprived him of the ability to speak. On 3 May of the same year, he traveled to the USA via Shanghai for recuperation. In Techny, Illinois, he suffered a second stroke on 21 April 1928 that left him unconscious. He died without having regained his consciousness on April 23. Georg Maria Stenz is buried in the cemetery of the compound of the Society of the Divine Word in Techny.

== Attitude towards the Chinese ==
In his writings, Stenz refers to the Chinese as "yellow queue men" ("gelber Zopfmann") and claims that "the Chinese in general" ("der Chinese im allgemeinen") show what he considers "very disagreeable character traits to Europeans" ("dem Europäer gegenüber sehr unsympathische Charaktereigenschaften"). In particular, he describes them as cunning ("verschmitzt") and with few exceptions incapable of true friendships ("gediegene Freundschaften"), as well as irascible ("Zorn"), cruel ("Grausamkeit"), cowardly ("Feigheit"), arrogant ("Stolz"), thankless ("Undankbarkeit"), and superstitious ("abergläubisch"). He also describes the Chinese as filthy ("Schmutzigkeit"), but excuses this as a consequence of poverty.

== Opinions about Georg M. Stenz ==
Joseph Esherick has characterised Stenz as a "particularly obnoxious missionary" with "a strikingly unattractive character" who "thoroughly typified the militancy of the S.V.D. mission".

== Works by Georg M. Stenz ==
- In der Heimat des Konfuzius: Skizzen, Bilder und Erlebnisse aus Schantung, Druck und Verlag der Missionsdruckerei, 1902
- Aus weiter Ferne: In Deutsch-China und Süd-Schantung. Kleine Erzählungen aus dem Leben der Missionare und Christen, Ensslin & Laiblin, 1903
- In Korea, dem Lande der "Morgenstille", Ensslin & Laiblin, 1904
- Ins Reich des Drachen: unter dem Banner des Kreuzes, Friedrich Alber, Ravensburg, 1906
- Beiträge zur Volkskunde Süd-Schantungs, R. Voigtländer, 1907
- Deutsch-chinesisches Wörterbuch, St. Franz Haver Kolleg, 1920
- P. Richard Henle, Missionar in China, Druck und Verlag der Missionsdruckerei, Steyl, 1925
- Chinesisch-deutsches Wörterbuch, Druck und Verlag der Katholischen Mission Yenchowfu, 1928
