= Yangtze Agreement =

1900 treaty between Great Britain and Germany

The Yangtze Agreement was an agreement between Great Britain and Germany signed on October 16, 1900, signed by Prime Minister Lord Salisbury and Ambassador Count Paul von Hatzfeldt respectively. It stated both parties' opposition to the partition of China into spheres of influence.

The agreement was signed in accordance with the Open Door Policy, which all major nations supported. The policy involved equal access to Chinese markets. The Germans supported it because a partition of China would limit Germany to a small trading market, instead of all of China.

== Background ==
In March 1898, the Russian Empire signed the Convention for the Lease of the Liaotung Peninsula with Qing Dynasty and occupied the southernmost point of Liaotung Peninsula, thus establishing a military advantage in Northern China. In May of the same year, British Colonial Secretary Joseph Chamberlain made a speech in his constituency, Birmingham, saying: "Those who sups with the devil (Russia) must have a long spoon... If the policy of isolation which has hitherto been the policy of this country (Britain) is to be maintained in the future then the fate of the Chinese Empire may be, and probably will be, hereafter decided without reference to our wishes and in defiance of our interests."

Chamberlain's comments indicated that the British government would abandon its existing 'Splendid Isolation' policy and form an alliance with the powers closest to its interests in the partition of China. France, which is opposed to Britain in Siam, Indochina, North Africa, is excluded because it is an ally of Russia, and the United States, like the British Empire was dependent on naval power, so it could not be a country against Russia. The new allies had to be a country with appropriate army power. Chamberlain and Duke of Devonshire, and Arthur Balfour named Germany or Japan as their allies.

Britain was prepared to coordinate its interests with Germany in the whole Colonial World and support Germany's interests in China. Even in Germany, unless they have a strong navy, they often have to rely on cooperation with Britain in terms of overseas expansion. However, it was welcome that Russia's attention was directed to East Asia because the German Empire, on the other hand, relaxed the pressure of the Franco-Russian Alliance due to its location bordering Russia and France in the east and west. Wilhelm II, the German Emperor, supported and greatly encouraged Russian Tsar Nicholas II's entry into China.

== Approach ==
The Russian, which provided large-scale troops during the Boxer Rebellion, once faced conflict with Germany in an attempt to gain the position of commander of the Eight-Nation Alliance Forces. In October 1900, Britain and Germany signed the Yangtze Agreement based on the principle of Open Door after a ceasefire. Japan declared that it was joining the agreement to check the advance of Russian, particularly in Manchuria.

Almost all of the powers supported the agreement, at least ostensibly. This agreement included equal access in the Chinese market, and the Germany supported the territorial integrity of China, as the partition of China would limit Germany's trade activities to smaller markets rather than to all of China. It was named the 'Yangtze Agreement' because this confirmed the respect for the interests of British in the Yangtze River Delta. Britain and Germany promised to observe free trade in their respective spheres, along with China's territorial integrity.

Russia, which took advantage of the Boxer Rebellion to occupy most of Manchuria and conduct a military administration there, signed a secret agreement with the local Chinese army in November 1900. The contents of Sino-Russian secret agreement were soon revealed, and the powers such as Britain, Germany, Japan, and the United States all opposed it. Britain proposed Germany to jointly protest against Russia's occupation of Manchuria, but German Chancellor Bernhard von Bülow, who wanted to avoid confrontation with Russia, stated at the Reichstag in early 1901 that the scope of the Yangtze Agreement did not include Manchuria. The Yangtze Agreement became virtually meaningless, and Britain sought cooperation with Japan as an alternative, establishing the Anglo-Japanese Alliance of 1902.
