= Franz Xaver Nies =

19th-century German Catholic missionary

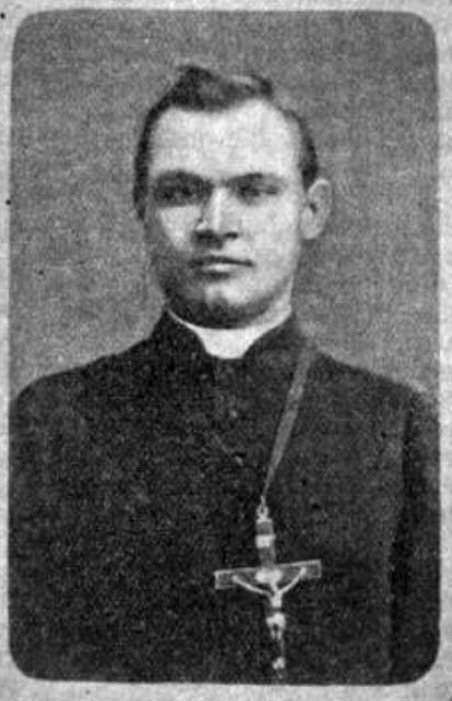
- Franz Xaver Nies
- Born: 11 June 1859; Rehringhausen, Olpe, Roman Catholic Archdiocese of Paderborn
- Died: 1 November 1897 (aged 38); Zhangjiazhuang, Juye, Shandong, China
- Cause of death: murder
- Other names: Chinese: 能方济; pinyin: Néng Fāngjì
- Occupation: missionary in Shandong
- Years active: 1885 to 1897
- Organization: Society of the Divine Word
- Known for: Juye incident

Franz Xaver Nies (Chinese: 能方济; pinyin: Néng Fāngjì, 11 June 1859 – 1 November 1897) was a German Catholic missionary of the Society of the Divine Word in Shandong during the late 19th century. Together with his fellow missionary Richard Henle, he was killed in the Juye Incident that led to the German occupation of the Kiautschou Bay concession and was followed by the acquisition of concessions in China by other foreign powers.

Franz Xaver Nies joined the Society of the Divine Word on 7 May 1879, was ordained as a priest by the Bishop of Roermond on 7 June 1884, and dispatched on his mission to China on 1 January 1885.

In his hometown of Rehringhausen, a road (Pater Franz Xaver Nies Weg) has been named after Franz Xaver Nies.

== See also ==
- Juye Incident
- Richard Henle
- Georg Maria Stenz
