= Richard Henle =

19th-century German Catholic missionary

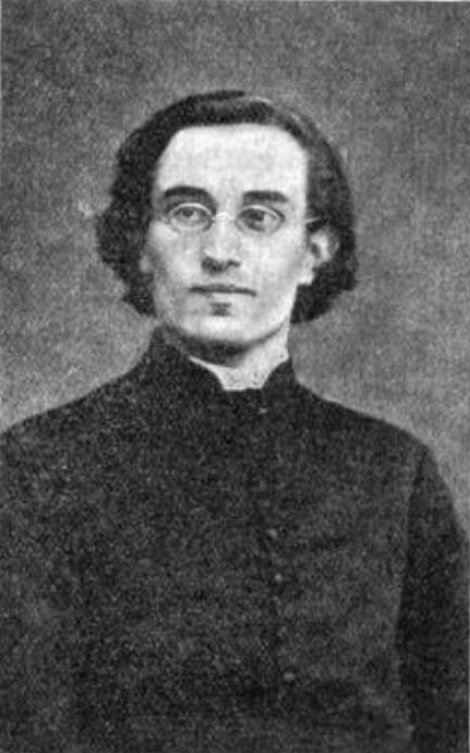
- Born: 21 July 1863; Stetten near Haigerloch, now part of Haigerloch, Kingdom of Württemberg
- Died: 1 November 1897 (aged 34); Zhangjiazhuang, Juye, Shandong, China
- Cause of death: murder
- Other names: Chinese: 韩理加略; pinyin: Hán Lǐjiālüè
- Occupation: missionary in Shandong
- Years active: 1890 to 1897
- Organization: Society of the Divine Word
- Known for: Juye incident
- Parent: Ulrich Henle

Richard Henle (Chinese: 韩理加略; pinyin: Hán Lǐjiālüè, 21 July 1863 – 1 November 1897) was a German Catholic missionary of the Society of the Divine Word in Shandong during the last decade of the 19th century. Together with Franz Xaver Nies, he was one of two missionaries killed in the Juye Incident that led to the German occupation of the Kiautschou Bay concession and was followed by the acquisition of concessions in China by other foreign powers.

Richard Henle arrived in the mission house of the Society of the Divine Word in Styl on 8 October 1880 and was ordained on 15 June 1888 by Cardinal Fischer of Cologne. He embarked on his mission to China from Style on 15 September 1890, traveling through Switzerland to Genoa, where he boarded the ship "Sachsen" to Shanghai on 30 September. The ocean journey went through the Suez canal, made stops in Aden and Colombo, Sri Lanka, before arriving in Shanghai on 5 November 1890.

== See also ==
- Juye Incident
- Franz Xaver Nies
- Georg Maria Stenz
