= Foreign imperialism in China =

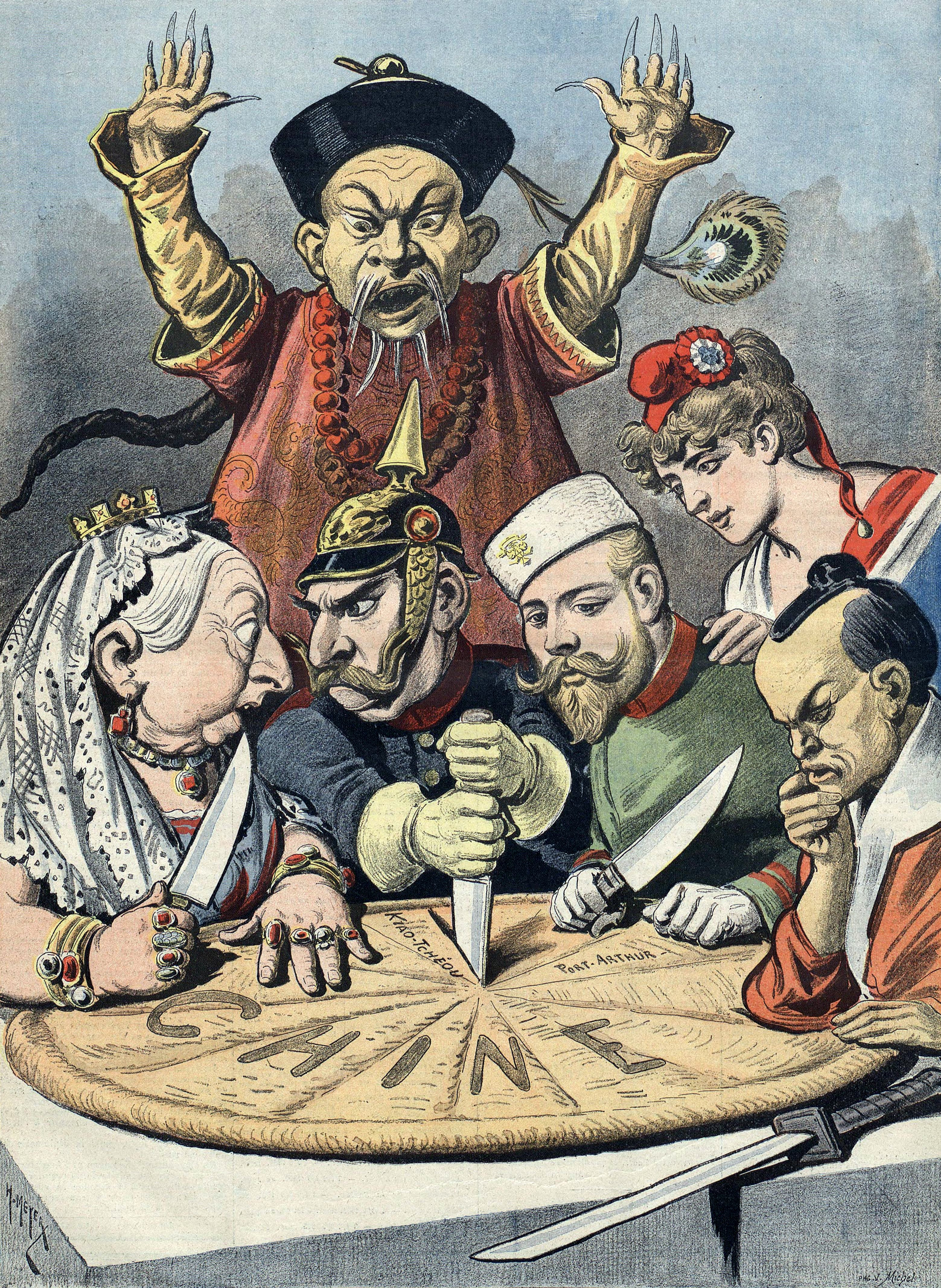
An 1898 French political cartoon depicting Britain, France, Russia, Germany, and Japan dividing China

During the 19th and 20th centuries, foreign powers practiced imperialism in China through the imposition of unequal treaties, opening of treaty ports, and establishment of foreign concessions and leased territories. Starting with the 1842 Treaty of Nanking following the Qing dynasty's defeat by Britain in the First Opium War, various foreign powers, including Britain, France, the United States, Russia, Germany, and Japan, forced China to concede sovereignty and in turn gained territorial, economic, and legal privileges from China. Chinese historians widely include China's subjugation to foreign powers as part of the "century of humiliation."

Within treaty ports, foreign powers controlled enclaves, known as concessions; and gained leases on territories that operated as de facto colonies. Foreign citizens in these areas were granted extraterritoriality, exempting them from Chinese legal jurisdiction in favor of their own consular courts. Foreign powers also maintained their own police forces, military garrisons, and independent taxation systems. The Scramble for China in the late 19th century saw a rapid acceleration of this process, as major powers carved out exclusive spheres of influence across the country, a trend only partially checked by the United States' Open Door Policy.

The foreign presence led to major changes to China's economy and society. Major treaty ports, particularly in Shanghai and Tianjin, became hubs of industrialization, Western education, and international trade. They introduced Western manufacturing, banking systems, and cultural practices to the region. At the same time, the loss of national sovereignty, along with social and legal inequalities between foreigners and natives, sparked Chinese resistance to foreign imperialism resulting in events such as the Boxer Rebellion and May Fourth movement.

The framework of unequal treaties slowly began to diminish after the establishment of the Republic of China. Amidst the Second Sino-Japanese War and World War II in the 1940s, most foreign powers relinquished their extraterritorial rights and concessions. The Chinese Communist Party abolished the remaining concessions after prevailing in the Chinese Civil War, although the final vestiges of foreign imperialism remained until the handover of Hong Kong in 1997 and the handover of Macau in 1999. The legacy of this period has greatly shaped China and is reflected today in its foreign policy, national identity, and economy.

== Terminology ==
=== Unequal treaties ===
The term "unequal treaties" refers to a series of one-sided agreements imposed upon China by foreign powers during the 19th and early 20th centuries. They were often signed following a Chinese capitulation from military defeats or threats. The terms specified obligations to be borne almost exclusively by China and included provisions such as ceding territory, paying reparations, opening treaty ports, relinquishing the right to control tariffs and imports, and granting extraterritoriality to foreign citizens. The earliest "unequal treaty" was the 1842 Treaty of Nanking, signed after the First Opium War. Because the unequal treaties all guaranteed most favoured nation for the foreign powers, if any foreign power gained additional advantages in China, these were automatically extended to provide parity to the other foreign powers.

The term was popularized in the 1920s by Sun Yat-sen to describe the treaties that were signed during the "treaty century". With the rise of Chinese nationalism and anti-imperialism, both the Kuomintang (KMT) and the Chinese Communist Party (CCP) used the concept to characterize the loss of Chinese sovereignty that started in the 1840s. In assessing the term's usage in rhetorical discourse since the early 20th century, American historian Dong Wang notes that "while the phrase has long been widely used, it nevertheless lacks a clear and unambiguous meaning" and that there is "no agreement about the actual number of treaties signed between China and foreign countries that should be counted as unequal." However, within the scope of Chinese historiographical scholarship, the phrase has typically been defined to refer to the many cases in which China was effectively forced to pay large amounts of financial reparations, open up ports for trade, cede or lease territories, and make various other concessions of sovereignty to foreign spheres of influence, following military threats. The Chinese-American sinologist Immanuel Hsu states that the Chinese viewed the treaties they signed with the foreign powers as unequal "because they were not negotiated by nations treating each other as equals but were imposed on China after a war, and because they encroached upon China's sovereign rights ... which reduced her to semicolonial status".

=== Treaty ports ===
Map showing Chinese treaty ports in the 19th and early 20th centuries

The treaty ports were designated Chinese cities that were opened to foreign trade and residence by the unequal treaties, and lasted for approximately one hundred years. The Treaty of Nanking established the first five treaty ports, and the Second Opium War gave rise to a second group of treaty ports. At its peak, more than 80 treaty ports were established in China; initially by Britain, France, and the United States; but soon expanding to all of the major foreign powers by the end of the 19th century.

=== Concessions and leased territories ===
The concessions were enclaves located in Chinese cities that were leased to, governed, and occupied foreign powers. In these concessions, foreigners were given the right to freely inhabit, trade, travel, and perform missionary evangelization. Some of these territories were directly leased by foreign powers, effectively removing them from the control of local governments and serving as de facto colonies. A 1937 inventory of all the concessions along with a survey of their status done by W. C. Johnstone shows that, aside from the two international settlements at Shanghai and Xiamen, there were a total of 23 foreign concessions to 8 nations in 10 Chinese cities. In addition to the 23 formally established concessions, Britain, Japan, and the United States were granted rights to concessions in several additional treaty ports, but these rights were never exercised.

In addition, territories were fully administered as colonies and had their sovereignty transferred to a foreign power in perpetuity. These include Portuguese Macau, and the areas of Hong Kong Island and Kowloon in British Hong Kong.

== History ==
=== 1839–1894: First unequal treaties ===
At the start of the 19th century, the Qing dynasty of China emerged from a golden age with a large population and territory. Under the Canton system, European powers were only allowed to conduct trade with China in Guangzhou. However, advances in transportation and communication, including steamships and railways, as well as intensified competition among major powers, began to drive foreign expansion into China.

==== First Opium War ====
A painting of the Second Battle of Chuenpi of the First Opium War

In 1842, China was defeated by Britain in the First Opium War and signed its first unequal treaty, the Treaty of Nanjing. The treaty ceded Hong Kong Island to Britain in perpetuity and established the first five treaty ports, although there was no mention of establishing separate residential areas for foreigners in those ports to self-govern.

Initially, the Daoguang Emperor of China still hoped to maintain the Canton system. The 1843 Treaty of the Bogue added extraterritorial rights that exempted British citizens from Chinese law in the treaty ports. The Chinese commissioner who negotiated the treaty reported to the emperor that the treaty ports would be strictly limited, stipulating that "the boundaries of an area should be designated which foreigners are not allowed to exceed" (yiding jiezhi, buxu yuyue), although this restriction was not clearly stated in the English-language version, and extraterritoriality continued to grow throughout the 1840s and 1850s.

In 1843, Captain George Balfour arrived in Shanghai as the first British consul. The local circuit intendant, Gong Mujiu, had been trying to limit contacts between Chinese and foreigners following two violent incidents that occurred between them. As such, Balfour initially could not even find a house for the consulate. He finally chose a location north of Yangjing Creek and requested Gong to designate an area for their establishment. In 1845, Gong and Balfour established the Land Regulations (shanghai zudi zhangcheng) agreement to set the institutional basis for the British concession of Shanghai.

==== Arrival of France and the U.S. ====
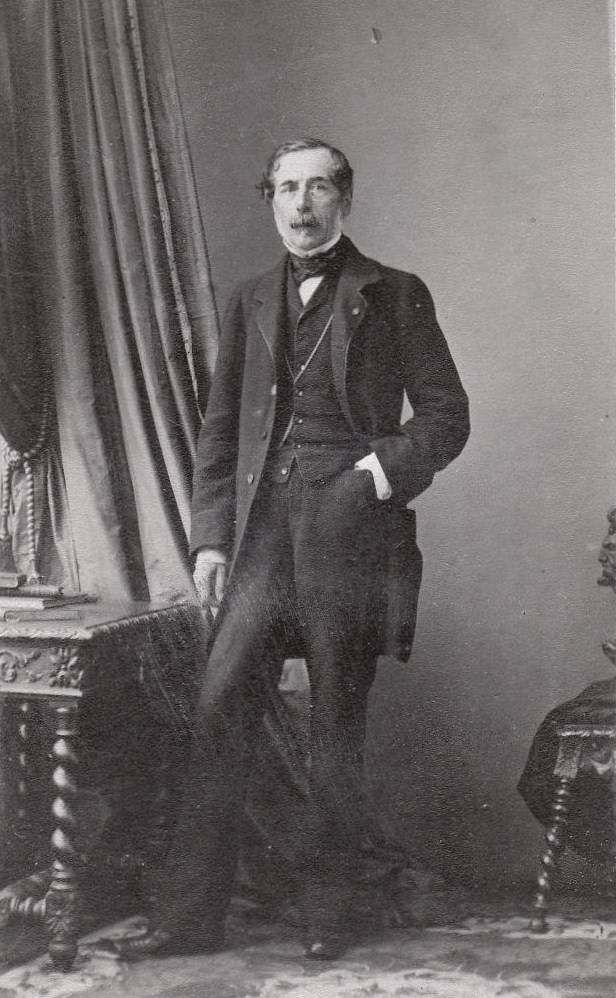
A portrait of French minister Marie Melchior Joseph Théodose de Lagrené

In 1844, subsequent negotiations with the United States in the Treaty of Wanghia and France in the Treaty of Whampoa led to further concessions for these nations on the same terms as the British. Following the British example, Charles de Montigny established the French concession of Shanghai in 1849. The local circuit intendant, Lin Gui, proclaimed that a French settlement would be established on a strip of land between the Chinese city and the British settlement.

Privileges obtained by France through the Treaty of Whampoa enabled it to establish its religious protectorate in China over Catholics. French minister Marie Melchior Joseph Théodose de Lagrené viewed the negotiation of the treaty as an opportunity to improve the prestige of France and the Catholic Church through religious policy, in addition to obtaining economic benefits. The treaty institutionalised benefits for French Catholics, including the ability to operate and establish religious institutions in the treaty ports, decriminalisation of Catholicism throughout China, and providing that any missionaries discovered by Chinese authorities outside the treaty ports should be escorted to a French consulate. In 1846, De Lagrené negotiated with the Daoguang Emperor for an edict which reaffirmed the free exercise of Catholic religious practice, mandated punishment for Chinese officials who persecuted Catholics, and restored to local Catholics all church property seized since the Kangxi Emperor's ban on Christianity in the early 18th century. As a result, magistrates dealing with Catholics in China were required to negotiate with French officials and address both domestic law and treaty law in the subsequent decades to follow.

==== Second Opium War ====
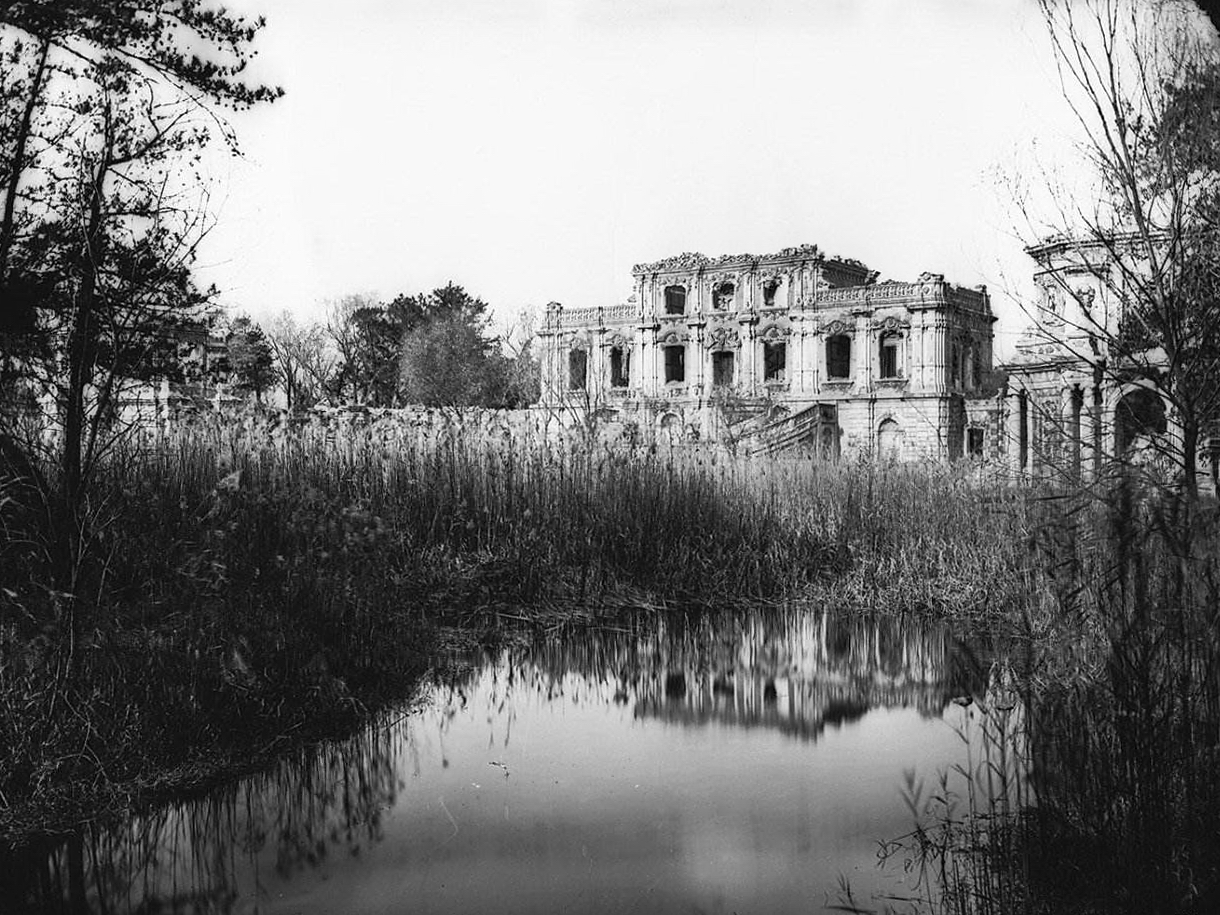
The ruins of the Old Summer Palace after being sacked by Anglo–French forces in the Second Opium War.

China's defeat in the Second Opium War (1856–1860) would lead to further Chinese concessions. Following China's defeat in the Second Opium War, the 1858 Treaty of Tientsin and the 1860 Convention of Peking required it to legalize opium, allow Christian missionaries to travel and buy property in China's interior, pay indemnities to foreign governments, and open additional ports and the Yangtze River to foreign trade. These treaties also allowed Britain and France to establish consulates in Beijing.

The American consul to China, George Seward, was dissatisfied that the British and the French had obtained the best plots of land in the area, and after lengthy deliberations, the American concession of Shanghai was established in the Hongkou district, although it was not delineated until 1863. In September of the same year, the British and American settlements were amalgamated into the Shanghai International Settlement and established the Municipal Council, officially the "The Council for the Foreign Community of Shanghai." The local French representatives had agreed to amalgamate the French settlement with the International Settlement, but this was not accepted by the French government, and the French concession remained independent until World War II. The International Settlement began with the 138 acres of the British settlement and increased in size to 470 acres by 1848. The addition of the American settlement and a number of subsequent additions brought the total area to 5,584 acres. With the inclusion of the 2,525 acres of the French settlement, the total area of foreign territory within Shanghai eventually reached 12.66 square miles.

==== Ili crisis ====
Britain and Russia had been competing to gain control over in Central Asia, referred to as the Great Game. After China lost control over Xinjiang in the Dungan Revolt (1862–1877), Russia occupied the Ili region of the territory. However, once the rebellion was suppressed, China demanded that Russia return the territory and even threatened to declare war, beginning the Ili crisis. China, through Robert Hart, invited British General Charles George Gordon to advise on its defence, and Gordon argued against war with Russia. In 1893, British observer Demetrius Charles Boulger proposed a British-Chinese alliance to check Russian expansion in Central Asia.

The Russians observed China expanding its modern military arsenal during the Ili crisis, notably purchasing thousands of rifles from Germany. In 1880, massive amounts of military equipment and rifles were shipped via sea to China from Antwerp as China purchased torpedoes, artillery, and more than 250 thousand modern rifles from Europe. In 1888, Russian explorer Dmitry Putyata visited China and found that in Manchuria, Chinese soldiers were potentially able to become adept at "European tactics" under certain circumstances and were armed with modern weapons like Krupp artillery, Winchester carbines, and Mauser rifles. As a consequence, Russia acknowledged that China potentially posed a serious military threat. Due to the Chinese modernization programs, Western media portrayed China as a rising military power and invoked fears that it was a major threat to the Western world and could successfully conquer European colonies such as Australia.

In Xinjiang, China offered more benefits to the native Kyrgyz people than Russia did, and Russian settlers often fought against the Kyrgyz, leading Russia to believe that the Kyrgyz would be a liability in any conflict against China. The Kyrgyz were sure that China would defeat Russia if war were to break out. Russian sinologists, the Russian media, threat of internal rebellion, the pariah status inflicted by the Congress of Berlin, the negative state of the Russian economy all led Russia to concede and negotiate with China and return most of Ili in the Treaty of Saint Petersburg, which was widely seen by the West as a Chinese diplomatic victory.

=== 1895–1911: Scramble for China ===
While the foreign settlements in Shanghai had been set up in cooperation with the local authorities and with the tacit, but not explicit, consent of the Chinese government, the concessions that were established later had a more definitive treaty basis and their development as well as the extension of their boundaries has been regularized by agreements with the Chinese government.

This period became widely known as the Scramble for China, but was also referred to as the Partition of China or the Scramble for Concessions. The Chinese press routinely described the scramble as the "carving up of the melon" (瓜分), and the idea of national humiliation was developed among Chinese writers during this period. Historians in China described China as a semi-colony under the domination by Western countries during this period.

==== First-Sino Japanese War ====
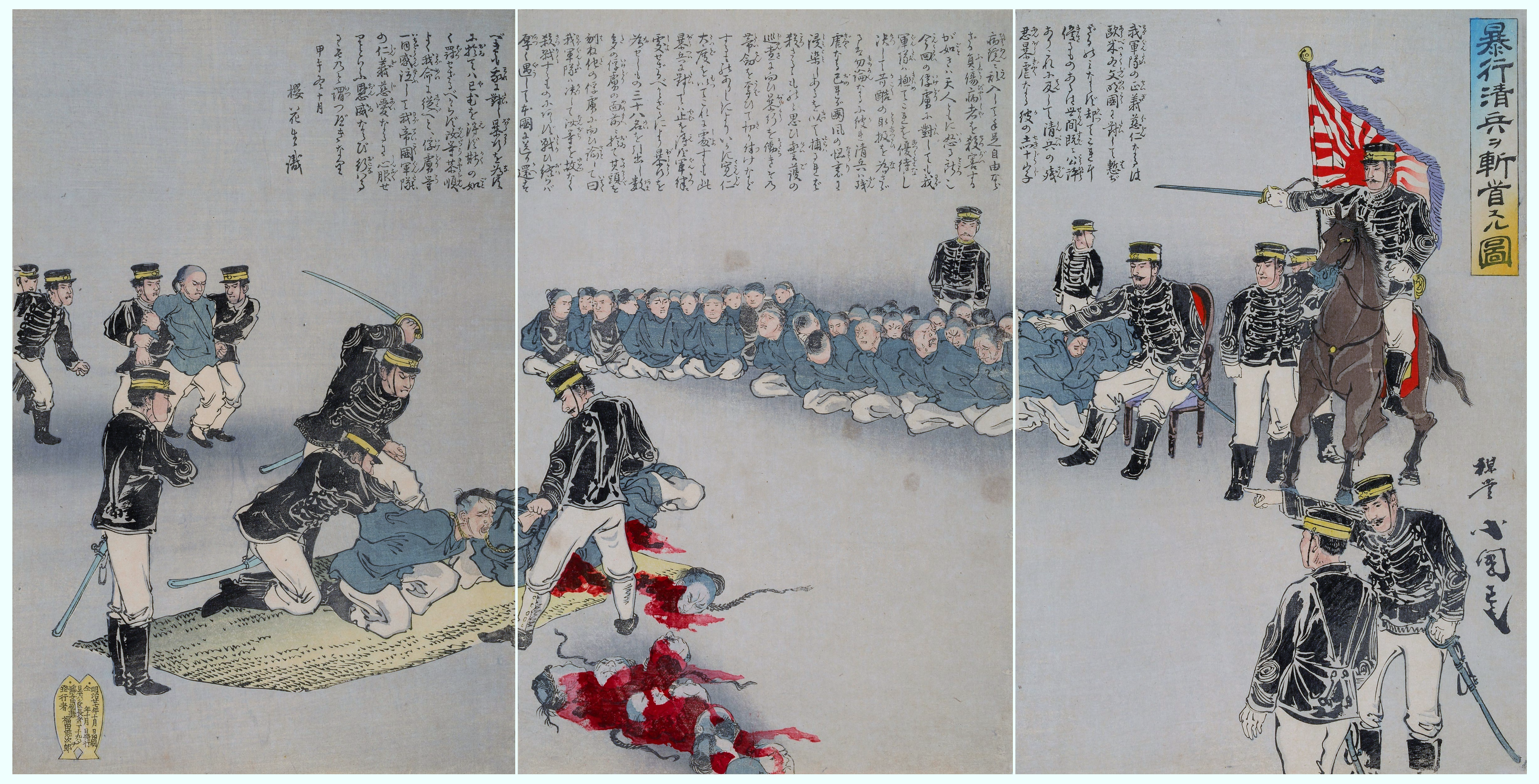
Japanese soldiers beheading Chinese prisoners during the First Sino-Japanese War, 1894

With China's defeat in the First Sino-Japanese War and the signing of the humiliating Treaty of Shimonoseki with Japan in 1895, China was considered the "Sick man of Asia", and the ambitions of foreign powers to compete for spheres of influence in China were greatly stimulated. During this period, Britain, France, Germany, Russia, and Japan gained special powers over large swaths of Chinese territory based on securing "nonalienation commitments" for their "spheres of interest" through the signing of more unequal treaties. The United States was unable to participate due to their involvement in the Spanish–American War. These spheres of influence, along with further concessions and leased territories, were acquired through the signing of more unequal treaties. The American Board of Commissioners for Foreign Missions wrote that the Scramble for China was comparable to the Scramble for Africa, which had sparked many discussions just a few years prior. The First Sino-Japanese War exposed China's vulnerability to the world and encouraged "eagles to gather together", which referred to the subsequent claims and projects established by foreign powers. The competition among foreign powers for access to Chinese markets has been described by some scholars as an early example of global competition for economic engagement with China.

==== Rapid acquisitions ====
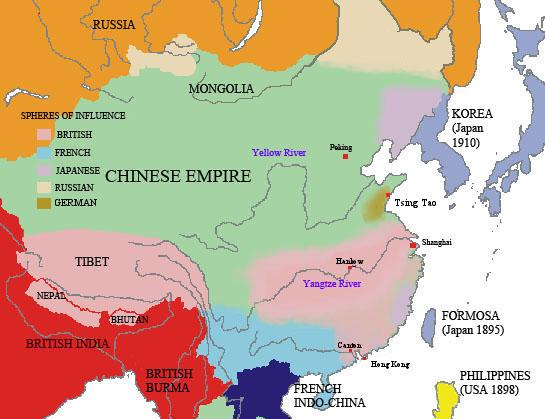
Spheres of influence in China during the late Qing dynasty

Germany acquired a sphere in Shandong and received exclusive control over developmental loans, mining, and railway ownership, along with a lease of Jiaozhou Bay. Russia gained a sphere over all territory north of the Great Wall of China, in addition to the previous tax exemption for trade in Mongolia and Xinjiang, economic powers similar to Germany's over Fengtian, Jilin, and Heilongjiang, and a lease of Liaodong. It placed its sphere under military occupation, imposed its own law and schools, seized mining and logging privileges, settled its citizens, and even established its own municipal administration on several cities, the latter without Chinese consent. France gained a sphere over Yunnan, as well as most of Guangxi and Guangdong, and a lease of Zhanjiang. Japan gained a sphere over Fujian, and was ceded Taiwan and Liaodong, although it was forced to return the latter after the Triple Intervention. Finally, the British gained a sphere over the whole Yangtze River valley (defined as all provinces adjoining the Yangtze river as well as Henan and Zhejiang), parts of Guangdong and Guangxi, and part of Tibet. It also received a lease of Weihai and lease of the New Territories and incorporated the latter into its colony of Hong Kong.

In 1899, Italy also presented an ultimatum to the Chinese government in the Sanmen Bay Affair and demanded a lease of Sanmen Bay in Zhejiang, only for the Chinese to decline. By then, Chinese Empress Dowager Cixi decided that it was no longer tenable to continue under the circumstances and stated at a palace meeting that "not a single piece of loess will be given to the Italians", forcing Italy to give up any claim on China's coast. The Chinese justified their refusal by arguing that Italy had no genuine political or economic stakes in China. Indeed, the Italian demand was mostly motivated for prestige to emulate the actions of the other foreign powers, and its failure made Italy "appear [as] a third or fourth-rate power." The fiasco was an embarrassment for Italy, which was still stung by its defeat in the First Italo-Ethiopian War. Such event in China also dispelled any idea of second-rate powers at that time, such as the Netherlands or Denmark, from taking the opportunity to participate in the Scramble for China.

==== Open Door Policy ====
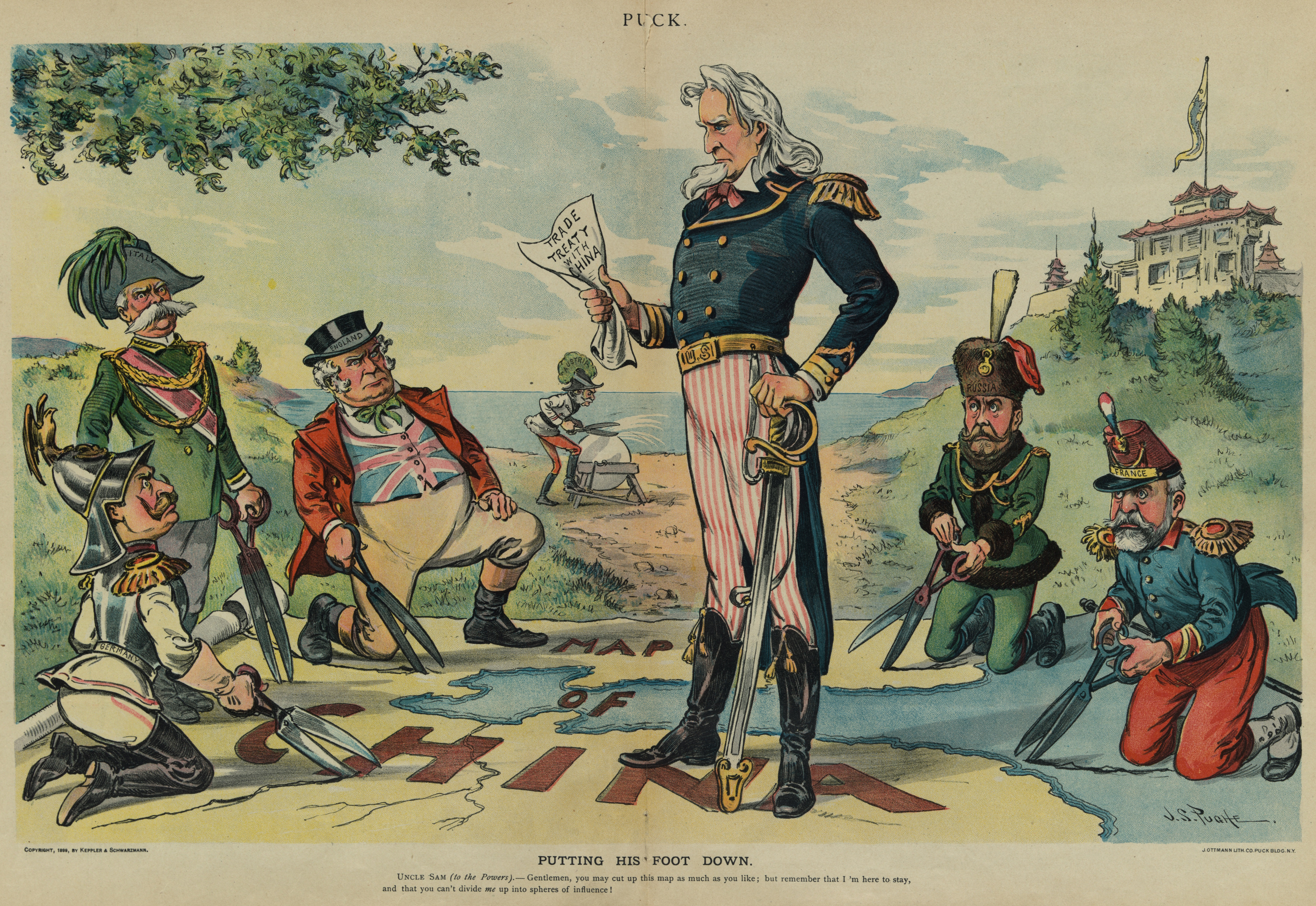
US cartoon from 1899: Uncle Sam (center, representing the United States) demanding Open Door access to trade with China while European powers plan to cut it up for themselves. From left to right: Kaiser Wilhelm II (Germany), King Umberto I (Italy), John Bull (Britain), Tsar Nicholas II (Russia) and President Emile Loubet (France). Emperor Franz Joseph I (Austria) is in the back.

As foreign powers continued to divide China into their own spheres, the United States, which had no sphere in China and only recently acquired the Philippines from Spain, grew alarmed at the possibility of its businessmen being excluded from Chinese markets. To prevent the "carving of China like a melon", as the European powers were doing in Africa at the time, the U.S. Secretary of State John Hay created the Open Door Policy to prevent full-scale colonization and proposed that all interested powers had equal access to China. He called for a system of equal trade and investment and a guarantee of China's territorial integrity.

In 1899, Hay circulated the "Open Door Note" to the various foreign powers, asking them to declare formally that they would uphold Chinese territorial and administrative integrity and would not interfere with the free use of the treaty ports within their spheres of influence in China, as the United States felt threatened by other powers' much larger spheres of influence in China and was worried that it might lose access to the Chinese market should the country be officially partitioned. The note asked the powers to keep China open to trade with all countries on an equal basis and called upon them to refrain from interfering with any treaty port or any vested interest within their spheres of influence to permit Chinese authorities to collect tariffs on an equal basis, and to show no favors to their own nationals in the matter of harbor dues or railroad charges. However, while the Open Door Policy preserved the territorial integrity of China from foreign powers, it further stimulated trade exploitation by the same powers.

==== Boxer Rebellion ====
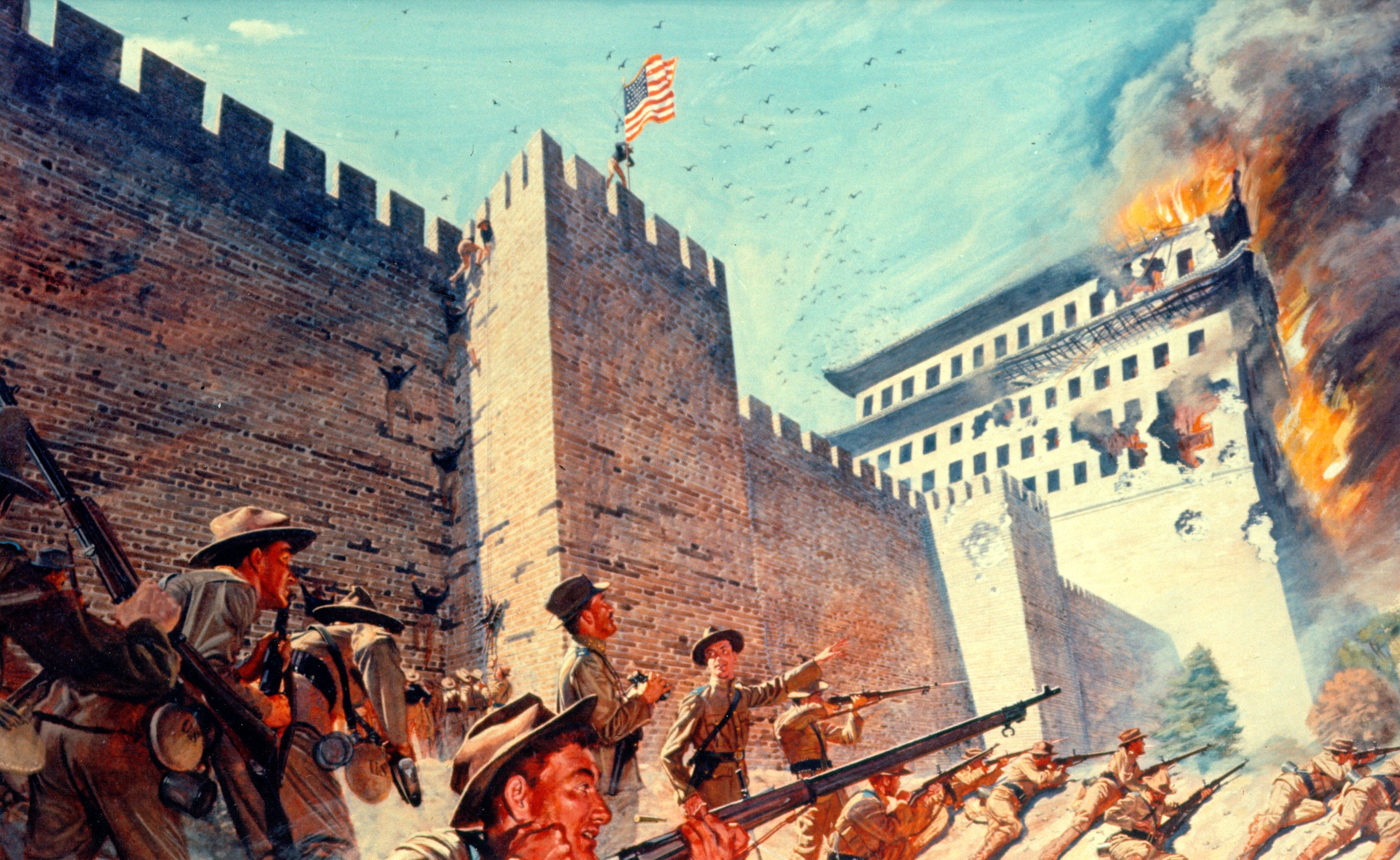
American troops storming the Beijing city fortifications during the Boxer Rebellion

The rapid increase in foreign influence within China contributed to growing anti-foreign sentiment, which played a role in the outbreak of the Boxer Rebellion (1899–1901), an uprising against foreigners and Christians. The movement was initiated by rural groups known as the Boxers and was associated with resistance to foreign economic and political influence following the numerous military defeats of China. At the time, the Chinese government was divided between the anti-foreign faction, led by Prince Duan and Dong Fuxiang, and pro-foreign faction, led by Ronglu and Prince Qing, with the pro-foreign faction hampering any military effort by the anti-foreign faction. In the end, Empress Dowager Cixi issued an imperial decree in the name of Guangxu Emperor that de facto declared war on the invading powers, which in turn formed a multinational military coalition known as the Eight-Nation Alliance to invade northern China and defeat the Boxers.

During this crisis, the Open Door Policy was then accepted only grudgingly, if at all, by the major powers, and it had no legal standing or enforcement mechanism. Each country tried to evade the policy by taking the position that it could not commit itself until the other nations had complied. However, on March 20, 1900, Hay announced that each of the powers had granted its consent in principle. Although treaties after 1900 referred to the Open Door Policy, competition continued unabated among the various powers for special concessions within China for railroad rights, mining rights, loans, foreign trade ports, and so forth. On October 16, 1900, Britain, led by Lord Salisbury, and Germany, led by Paul von Hatzfeldt, signed the Yangtze Agreement to oppose the partition of China into spheres of influence and endorse the Open Door Policy. Germany supported the agreement because it believed that partitioning China would limit it to a small trading market instead of all of China.

After the Eight-Nation Alliance won the Battle of Peking, the foreign powers occupied the city for more than a year. For the second time since the Second Opium War, British and French forces looted and burned the Old Summer Palace to the ground. Under the orders of Wilhelm II, German forces were particularly severe to exact revenge for the killing of Clemens von Ketteler. Russian forces tightened their sphere in Manchuria.

Initially, the Chinese government evacuated to Xi'an and threatened to continue the war against foreigners until the foreign powers tempered their demands and promised that China would not have to cede any land nor execute Dong Fuxiang and Prince Duan. The fighting ended in 1901 with the signing of the Boxer Protocol, which awarded the foreign participants with more concessions in the years following the conflict. It also led the foreign powers to station barracks and troops in the existing concessions, especially Tianjin, and increased the immigration of entire families to the concessions.

==== Easing of imperial ambitions ====
Following the signing of the Boxer Protocol in 1901, some of the Western powers believed they had acted in excess and that the Protocol was too humiliating. After the formation of the Anglo-Japanese Alliance in 1902, Germany began to reassess its policy approach towards China. In 1907, Germany proposed an entente that would align Germany, the United States, and China, a stance supported by Russia or Austria-Hungary, effectively countering existing Anglo-French-Japanese pact. Germany sent Prince Bernhard von Bülow to negotiate a potential tripartite treaty with the Chinese general Yuan Shikai and U.S. President Theodore Roosevelt but was ultimately unsuccessful in its plans to balancing international power in East Asia. Instead, the situation led indirectly to the Gentlemen's Agreement of 1907, focusing more narrowly on Japan–U.S. negotiations concerning immigration policy, rather than a formal multilateral alliance. Political instability in China, including the death of the Empress Dowager Cixi, which shifted priorities.

Over the next decades, American policy-makers and national figures continued to refer to the Open Door Policy as a basic doctrine, which stopped the European powers from carving up China into colonies, but did allow them to establish spheres of influence. The policy was gradually accepted by the major powers, and the partioning of China diminished. Intended to weaken Germany, Japan, and Russia, it was only somewhat enforced and was gradually broken by the following Warlord Era and Japanese interventions. With the 1908 Root–Takahira Agreement, the U.S. and Japan upheld the Open Door Policy. Nevertheless, China continued to feel humiliated by other factors, such as the Chinese Exclusion Act and Boxer Indemnity Scholarship.

=== 1912–1945: Republic of China ===
Weakened by domestic turmoil and foreign aggression, the Qing dynasty was ultimately overthrown in the Xinhai Revolution (1911–1912), and the Republic of China was established in its place. Though this was a significant and historic change for China, it continued to remain under foreign imperialism, especially after receiving the Twenty-One Demands from Japan in 1915. The United States contradicted its own Open Door Policy by agreeing to recognise the Japanese sphere in 1917 with the Lansing-Ishii Agreement.

==== May Fourth movement ====
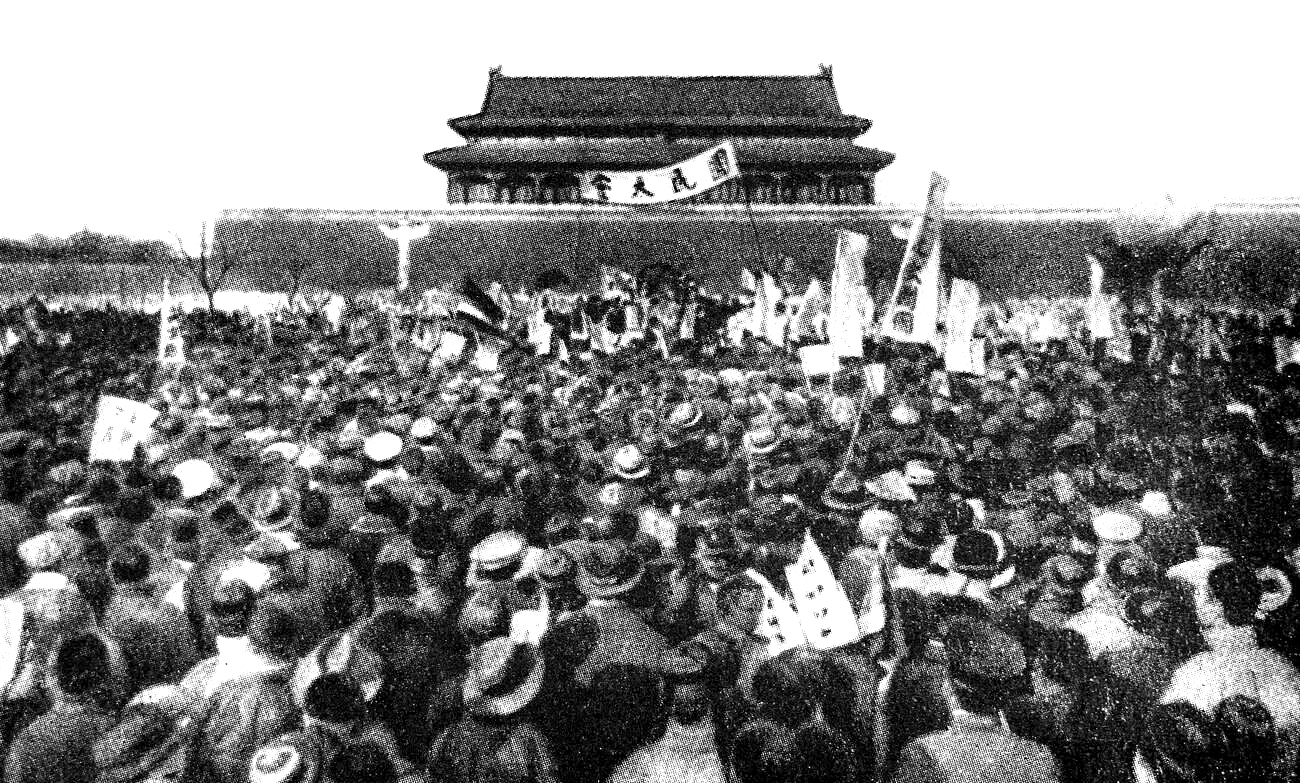
Photo of students gathering in Tiananmen Square during the May Fourth movement

With the outbreak of World War I (1914–1918), Japan entered the war as a member of the Allies and occupied the German leased territory of Kiautschou Bay. China initially remained netural to the conflict, but on March 14, 1917, it broke off diplomatic relations with Germany and terminated the German concessions of Hankou and Tianjin. It later formally declared war on Germany on August 14, 1917.

In 1919, the post-war Paris Peace Conference determined that Japan, which still occupied Kiautschou Bay, would be allowed to keep the leased territory. The Chinese delegate, Wellington Koo refused to sign the Treaty of Versailles, resulting in China being the only conference member to boycott the signing ceremony. Widely perceived in China as a betrayal of the country's wartime contributions by the other conference members, the domestic backlash following the failure to restore Shandong ultimately led to the May Fourth movement.

The May Fourth movement, fueled by a strong backlash of nationalism against aggressive Japanese moves to dominate China in World War I, focused its ire not just on Japan, but also resisting the overall state of foreign imperialism over the country. The movement also fueled support for the Kuomintang and the Chinese Communist Party, which both competed to convince the public that their approach would be more effective. They also popularized the characterization of the term "unequal treaty" to protest the loss of Chinese territory to foreign powers.

In 1920, there were more than 200 foreign outposts of various kinds in China, including more than 50 treaty ports.

On May 20, 1921, China secured the German-Chinese peace treaty (Deutsch-chinesischer Vertrag zur Wiederherstellung des Friedenszustandes), which was considered the first equal treaty between China and a European nation. The 1922 Nine-Power Treaty was also a major attempt to reaffirm Chinese sovereignty, though it failed to check Japan's expansionism and had a limited effect on extraterritoriality.

==== Nationalist China ====
After Chiang Kai-shek reunified China under the Nationalist government in 1928, foreign powers quickly offered diplomatic recognition, which aroused anxiety in Japan. The new government declared that China had been exploited for decades under unequal treaties, and that the time for such treaties was over, demanding they renegotiate all of them on equal terms. For instance, while the Soviet Union had established the Karakhan Manifesto in 1919 and promised to return their concessions, they nevertheless secretly continued to hold concessions, such as the Chinese Eastern Railway, as well as consulates, barracks, and Orthodox churches. This led Chiang to seize the remaining Soviet concessions in 1927, sparking an armed conflict with the Soviet Union over the Chinese Eastern Railway in 1929.

During the Nanjing decade, China continued to unsuccessfully negotiate an end to the unequal treaties. On the eve of World War II, Britain, Japan, France, and Italy continued to hold concessions.

==== Second Sino-Japanese War ====
As the Second Sino-Japanese War (1937–1945) began, Japan abandonded their concession in Chongqing. They also avoided attacking other foreign concessions, although after their attack on Pearl Harbor, they invaded and occupied them. Vichy France retained control over French concessions in China but was coerced into handing them over to the collaborationist Wang Jingwei regime. The war would also spell the end for the concessions in Tianjin, as well as extraterritoriality as a whole.

In 1943, the major western Allies of World War II, at the direction of the United States, agreed to revoke all unequal treaties they signed with China, officially ending their extraterritoriality and political and trade privileges. Chiang Kai-shek declared the end of the century of humiliation with the repeal of all the unequal treaties and promoted his wartime resistance to Japanese rule and China's place among the Big Four.

After Italy signed the Armistice of Cassibile with the Allies, the Wang Jingwei regime annexed its concession of Tianjin. It would later formally surrender its special treaty rights and rights in the international settlements at Shanghai and Xiamen in the Treaty of Paris. The postwar Sino-French Accord of February 1946 affirmed Chinese sovereignty over the former French concessions.

The international communities that were residues of the treaty port era ended in the late 1940s when the communists took over and nearly all foreigners left. However, British Hong Kong and Portuguese Macau remained as the last vestiges of foreign imperialism until both were handed over in 1997 and 1999, respectively.

== Administration ==
=== Law ===
Foreigners would be tried by their own consular authorities rather than the Chinese legal system. Each concession also had its own police force and different legal jurisdictions with their own separate laws. Thus, an activity might be legal in one concession but illegal in another.

The unequal treaties gave foreign powers jurisdiction over missions in China and some authority over Chinese Christians. If foreign missionaries entered the Chinese interior, the unequal treaties required them to be brought back to the treaty ports and delivered to the civil authorities of their nation. Typically, the foreign civil authorities would release the missionary and not impose a penalty.

=== Military ===
Many of the concessions also maintained their own military garrison and a standing army, although Chinese military and police forces were sometimes also present. Some efforts were made by the foreign powers to have the different police forces cooperate and work together, but this did not bear significant success. Officially, the foreign powers were not allowed to station military units in The Bund, but in practice, there often was a warship or two in the harbor.

== Economy ==
=== Trade ===
There were economic inequalities between the concessions and surrounding areas outside. European powers had citizens employed inside of the Chinese Maritime Customs Service. Despite the service being sovereign to China, foreigners often influenced taxes levied and tariffs imposed upon foreign concessions, often to their own benefit. Foreign entities also benefited from imposing their own local taxes inside of their nation's respected concession. They might have their own courts, post offices, commercial institutions, railroads, and gunboats. However, their control could have been exaggerated in some cases, with the local governments persistently restricting further encroachment.

Over time, and without formal permission, Britain, France, Japan and the United States established their own postal systems within their concession and trade areas. Following Chinese complaints over the loss of postal revenue and the lack of customs inspections, all of them were abolished in late 1922.

Treaty ports were major centers for all imports and exports in China. However, the opium trade was handled by smugglers in other cities. Chinese merchants headquartered there set up branches across Southeast Asia, including British Singapore and Malaya, the Dutch East Indies, French Indochina, and the American Philippines.

=== Industrialization ===
Although the great majority of Chinese lived in rural areas, a handful of treaty port cities became vibrant centers that had an enormous impact on the Chinese economy. Above all, Shanghai became the dominant urban center, and the Shanghai International Settlement rapidly developed into one of the world's most modern cities, often compared to Paris, Berlin, and London. It set the standard of modernity for China and all of East Asia. The foreigners took out long-term leases on the land and set up factories, offices, warehouses, sanitation, police, gardens, restaurants, hotels, banks, and private clubs Tianjin and Shenyang, as well as British Hong Kong, grew similarly, while the other 89 treaty port cities that were of minor importance.

The European community promoted technological and economic innovation, as well as knowledge industries, that proved especially attractive to Chinese entrepreneurs as models for their cities across the growing nation. Chinese entrepreneurs learned their skills in the port cities, and soon applied for and received bank loans for their startups.

Foreign entrepreneurs introduced the latest European manufacturing techniques, providing a model followed sooner or later by all of China. The first establishments focused on shipbuilding, ship repair, railway repair, and factories producing textiles, matches, porcelain, flour, and machinery. Tobacco, cigarettes, textiles, and food products were the specialty in Canton. Financing was handled by branch banks, as well as entirely new operations such as The Hongkong and Shanghai Banking Corporation (HSBC), which continues to remain a world-class establishment.

Across the modernizing world, railway construction was a major financial and industrial endeavor, usually led by Britain. Investments now poured into building a railway-plus-telegraph system knitting China together, connecting the treaty ports, and other major cities, as well as mining districts and agricultural centers.

== Society ==
=== Culture ===
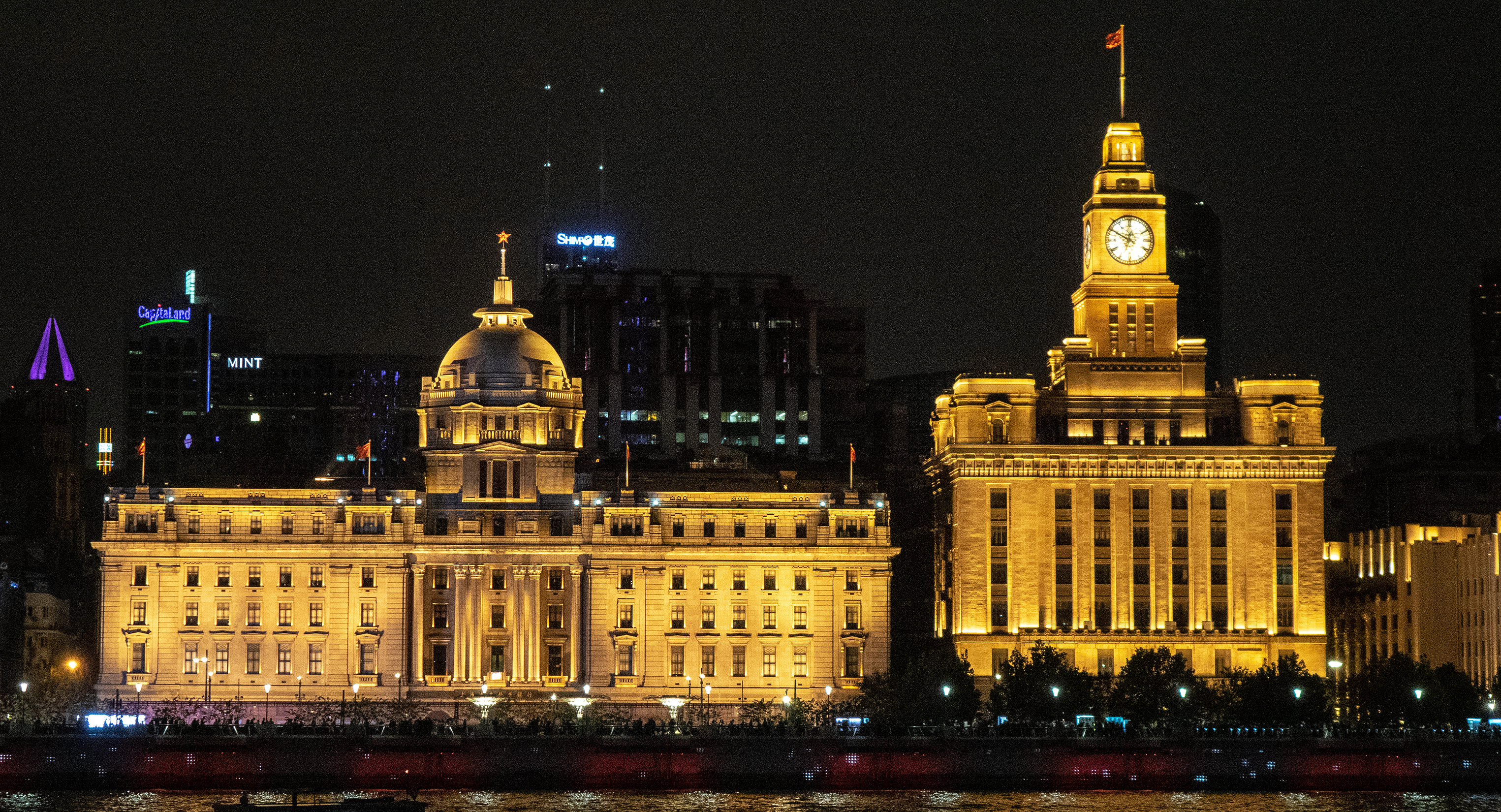
The Hong Kong and Shanghai Bank, built in 1923 and The Customs House, built in 1927, Shanghai

Foreigners all lived in prestigious sections newly built for them on the edges of existing port cities. Western images of the Chinese treaty ports focus on the distinctive geography of the "bund", a long narrow strip of land in a prime location on the waterfront where the businesses, offices, warehouses, and residences of all foreigners were located. A "bund" was a self-governing operation with its own shops, restaurants, recreational facilities, parks, churches, courts, police, and local government. A typical "bund" contained British, German, French, American, Japanese, and other foreigners. The British, who by far dominated foreign trade with China, normally were the largest presence. The facilities were generally off-limits to the natives. The first "bund" opened in 1844 at Ningbo and was known as the Old Bund, although The Bund in Shanghai became the largest and most famous.

Many foreigners arrived in the cities aiming primarily to get rich. Businessmen and officials typically brought their own families with them and stayed for years but sent their older children back to England for education. They developed their own sub-cultures, isolated and distinct from the intrinsic Chinese culture, and colonial administrations attempted to give their concessions "homeland" qualities. Churches, public houses, and various other western commercial institutions sprang up in the concessions. In the case of Japan, its own traditions and language naturally flourished. Some of these concessions eventually had a more advanced architecture of each originating culture than most cities back in the countries of the origin of the foreign powers. The wealthy built opulent buildings with multiple European and Chinese inspirations. Some Chinese entrepreneurs became very wealthy and hired foreign designers and architects.

During the 1920s, the concessions saw a sharp increase in both foreign immigration from abroad and Chinese immigration from the surrounding territories. The Chinese population eventually surpassed foreigners inside the concessions. With foreign immigration, culture took on a unique blend of many influences in both language and architecture. Writings from the time period indicate that both the Prussians and Russians were seen as acting culturally British within the concessions.

=== Education ===
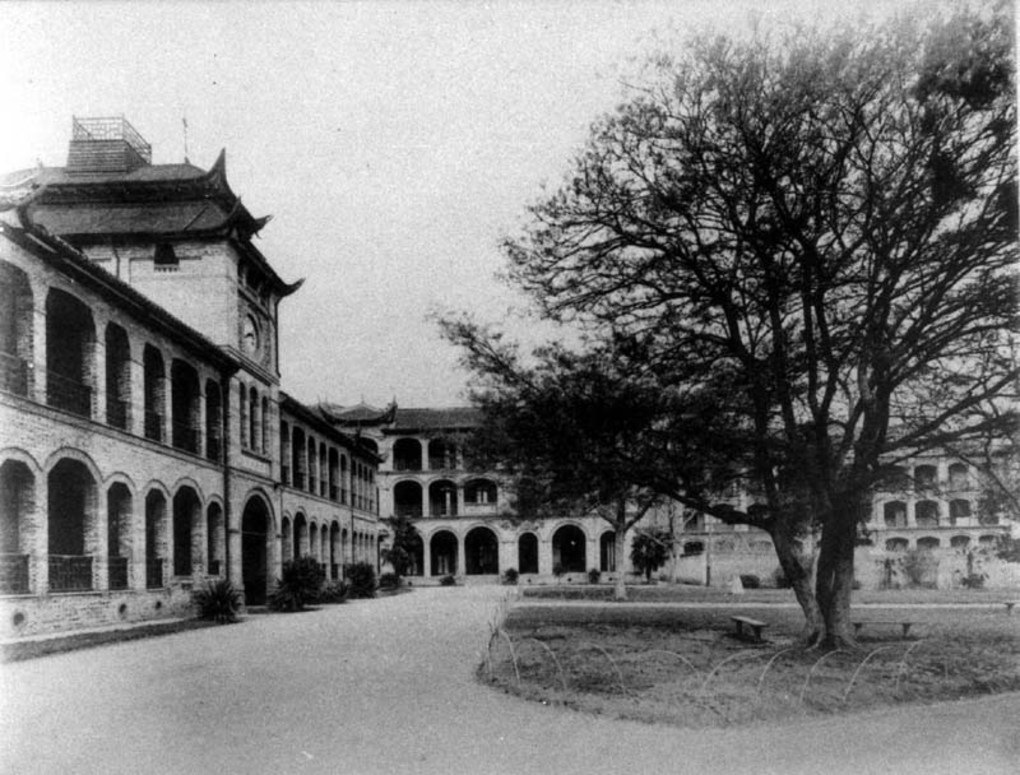
St. John's University in 1905

Education flourished in the treaty port cities, with printing shops, newspapers, magazines, and pamphlets in Chinese and European languages. Book publishers often featured Chinese translations of European classics in philosophy, politics, literature, and social issues.

This vast network, with Shanghai as its center, spurred the transformation of the Chinese urban population. In their thoughts, tastes, and daily activities, the educated and affluent groups of the urban population began to abandon traditional ways of living and started to embrace what they saw as modern lifestyles.

— Klaus Mühlhahn

Students poured into the treaty port cities. For example, St. John's University in Shanghai (1879–1952) first set up faculties of theology, Western learning, and Chinese languages, then expanded to cover literature, science, medicine, and intense coverage of Western languages eagerly sought by the ambitious Chinese intellectuals and entrepreneurs who had rejected the old Confucian exam system for the Western model of modernity. Engineering schools were established as well, and by 1914 a network of universities, colleges, teacher training schools, and specialized industrial schools was headquartered in the Port cities, and diffusing their alumni across urban China. Many adopted ideas and used the facilities newly opened to them to network with each other, set up organizations and publications, and plot a revolution against the Qing dynasty.

=== Religion ===
Outside the treaty ports, the only foreigners were occasional Christian missionaries, and they often encountered serious difficulties. Christian missionaries saw all of the Chinese population as their target audience, but they were headquartered in the port cities. The missionaries had very modest success in the conversion of the Chinese population but discovered they became widely popular for setting up medical and educational facilities.

=== Crime ===
In major cities like Shanghai and Tianjin, criminals could commit a crime in one jurisdiction and then easily escape to another. This became a major problem in 1920s and 1930s with the Warlord Era and subsequent collapse of a central government. Crime often flourished, especially organized crime by different warlord groups. The image of gangsters and Triad societies connected with the major cities and concessions of the period is often due to extraterritoriality within the cities.

Underdeveloped economies under a foreign government led many laborers without opportunities to be recruited by triads, who developed a subculture inspired by other eras that China was under foreign domination. The central government had almost no police power in the treaty port cities, allowing secret societies to flourish in the Chinese community, some of which turned into criminal gangs. Eventually, Shanghai had a strong underground illegal underworld that was ready to employ violence, and secret societies controlled drug trade, gambling, and prostitution in the city. Western outlaws also created organized crime groups, in one instance creating an "orientalist mini crime empire" in 1930s Shanghai.

== Legacy ==
=== Historical analysis ===
Historians have judged the Qing dynasty's vulnerability and weakness to foreign imperialism in the 19th century to be based mainly on its maritime naval weakness, but it achieved military success against Westerners on land. The historian Edward L. Dreyer stated, "China's nineteenth-century humiliations were strongly related to her weakness and failure at sea. At the start of the First Opium War, China had no unified navy and not a sense of how vulnerable she was to attack from the sea. British navy forces sailed and steamed wherever they wanted to go. In the Second Opium War, the Chinese had no way to prevent the 1860 Anglo-French navy expedition from sailing into the Bohai Sea and landing as near as possible to Beijing. Meanwhile, new but not exactly modern Chinese armies suppressed the midcentury rebellions, bluffed Russia into a peaceful settlement of disputed frontiers in Central Asia, and defeated the French forces on land in the Sino-French War. But the defeat at sea, and the resulting threat to steamship traffic to Taiwan, forced China to conclude peace on unfavorable terms."

The historian Jane E. Elliott criticized the allegation that China refused to modernize or was unable to defeat Western armies as simplistic by noting that China embarked on a massive military modernization in the late 1800s after several defeats, bought weapons from Western countries, and manufactured its own at arsenals, such as the Hanyang Arsenal during the Boxer Rebellion. In addition, Elliott questioned the claim that Chinese society was traumatized by the Western victories, as many Chinese peasants (then 90% of the population) lived outside the concessions and continued about their daily lives uninterrupted and without any feeling of "humiliation".

=== Special economic zones ===
Today, most of the special economic zones of China are located in former treaty ports and therefore have symbolic significance in demonstrating a "reversal of fortunes" in China's dealings with foreigners. Researcher Zongyuan Zoe Liu writes that "[t]he success of these cities as 'red' treaty ports represented another step in China's overall reform and opening-up plan while legitimizing the leadership of the [Chinese Communist Party] over the Chinese state and people."

=== Political usage ===
In speeches, documents, and state media, Chinese leaders use the narrative of foreign imperialism to highlight China's vulnerability during the period of foreign imperialism and to present the Chinese Communist Party (CCP) as the force that ended national subjugation by outside powers. In 2021, coinciding with the United States–China talks in Alaska, China began referring to the period as 120 years of humiliation, a reference to the Boxer Protocol.

The narrative is also applied to Taiwan, with officials framing reunification as part of the same historical process of overcoming national fragmentation and foreign interference. Chinese officials and state media often portray U.S. tariffs, export controls, investment screens, and supply-chain restructuring as modern forms of pressure analogous to the unequal economic conditions imposed on China during the nineteenth century. This narrative emphasizes that just as foreign powers once used their economic advantages to weaken China, present-day U.S. policies are interpreted as attempts to constrain China's technological development.

== See also ==
- Haijin — Qing bans on trade (1661–1683; 1717–1727)
- Canton system — Qing regulations on trade (1757–1842)
- Territorial losses of Thailand — Foreign imperialism in Thailand (Siam)
