= Jietou incident =

1898 capture of German missionary in China

The Jietou incident (German: Jietou Zwischenfall) was a conflict in which a German missionary, Georg Maria Stenz, was held captive and injured. It lasted from November 8 to 11, 1898 and took place in the village of Jietou (衖头镇) in Rizhao, Shandong, China.
