= Paul Wolff Metternich =

German diplomat (1853–1934)

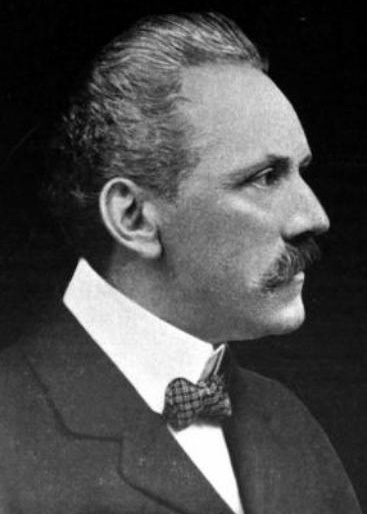
- Born: December 5, 1853; Bonn
- Died: November 29, 1934 (aged 80); Heppingen

Paul Anton Marie Hubert Graf Wolff Metternich zur Grach (December 5, 1853 – November 29, 1934) was a Prussian and German ambassador in London (1901–1912) and Constantinople (1915–1916). He was a prominent German opponent of Ottoman actions during the Armenian genocide.

== Diplomatic career ==
Count Metternich began his career in the diplomatic service in 1882. He held early diplomatic postings in London, Brussels and South America.

He was appointed Envoy Extraordinary from the German Empire to the Court of St. James's in September 1901 in the absence for illness of the Ambassador, Count von Hatzfeldt. He was formally appointed German Ambassador in November, when Count Hatzfeldt resigned shortly before his death. King Edward VII received his credentials at Marlborough House on 2 December 1901. During his tenure, he endeavored in vain to ease the tense German-British relations caused primarily due to the naval arms race between the two countries.

He wrote in a report to Chancellor Theobald von Bethmann Hollweg on July 10, 1916, "In a realisation of their plan to resolve the Armenian Question by destroying the Armenian race, the Turkish Government is not stopped neither by our representatives, nor by the public opinion of the west".

== Honours ==
German Honours

- (Kingdom of Prussia) : Order of the Crown, First class

Foreign Honours

- (United Kingdom) : Honorary Knight Grand Cross of the Royal Victorian Order, GCVO - 1 February 1901.

== See also ==
- Witnesses and testimonies of the Armenian genocide
