= Horhausen, Altenkirchen =

Horhausen
- Municipality
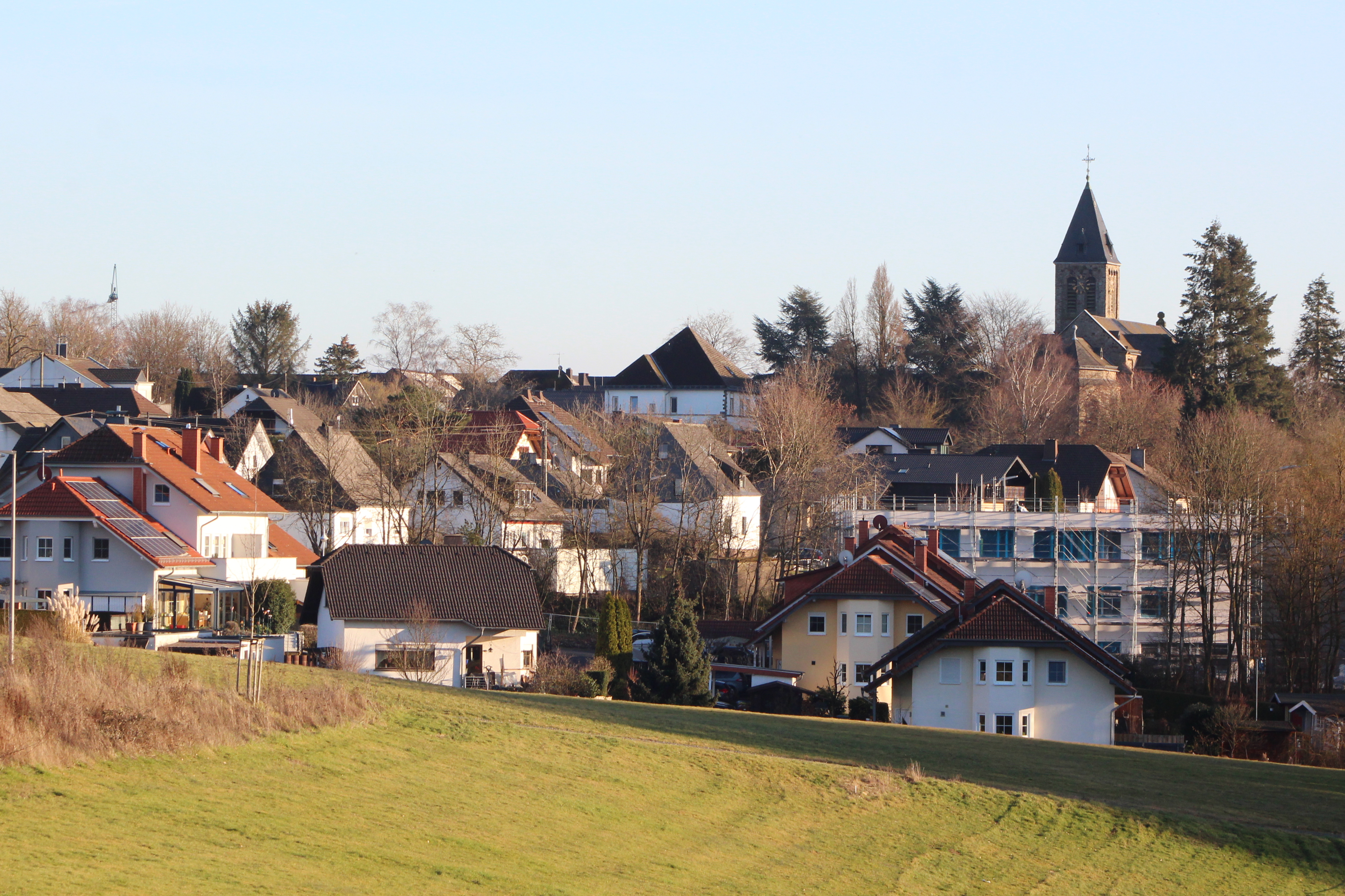

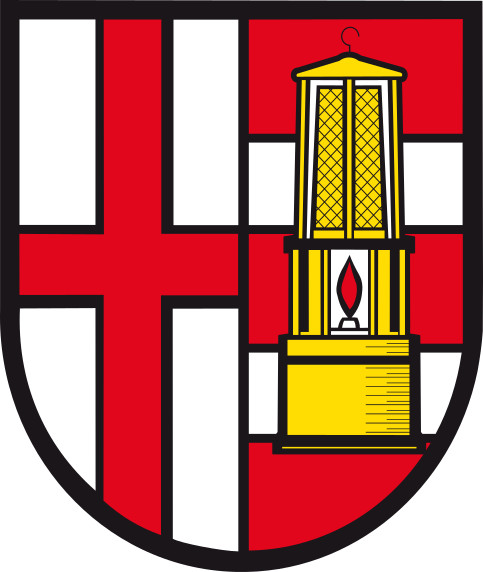
- Coat of arms

- Location of Horhausen within Altenkirchen (Westerwald) district
- Interactive map of Horhausen
- Location within Germany Location within Rhineland-Palatinate
- Coordinates: 50°35′20″N 7°31′57″E
- Country: Germany
- State: Rhineland-Palatinate
- District: Altenkirchen (Westerwald)
- Municipal assoc.: Altenkirchen-Flammersfeld
- Subdivisions: 3

Government
  - Mayor (2019–24): Thomas Schmidt

Area
  - Total: 4.72 km^{2} (1.82 sq mi)
- Elevation: 320–360 m (1,050–1,180 ft)

Population (2025-12-31)
  - Total: 2,148
  - Density: 455/km^{2} (1,180/sq mi)
- Time zone: UTC+01:00 (CET)
  - Summer (DST): UTC+02:00 (CEST)
- Postal codes: 56593
- Dialling codes: 02687
- Vehicle registration: AK
- Website: www.horhausen.de

Horhausen is a municipality in the district of Altenkirchen, in Rhineland-Palatinate, in western Germany.
