= Paul von Hatzfeldt =

German diplomat (1831–1901)

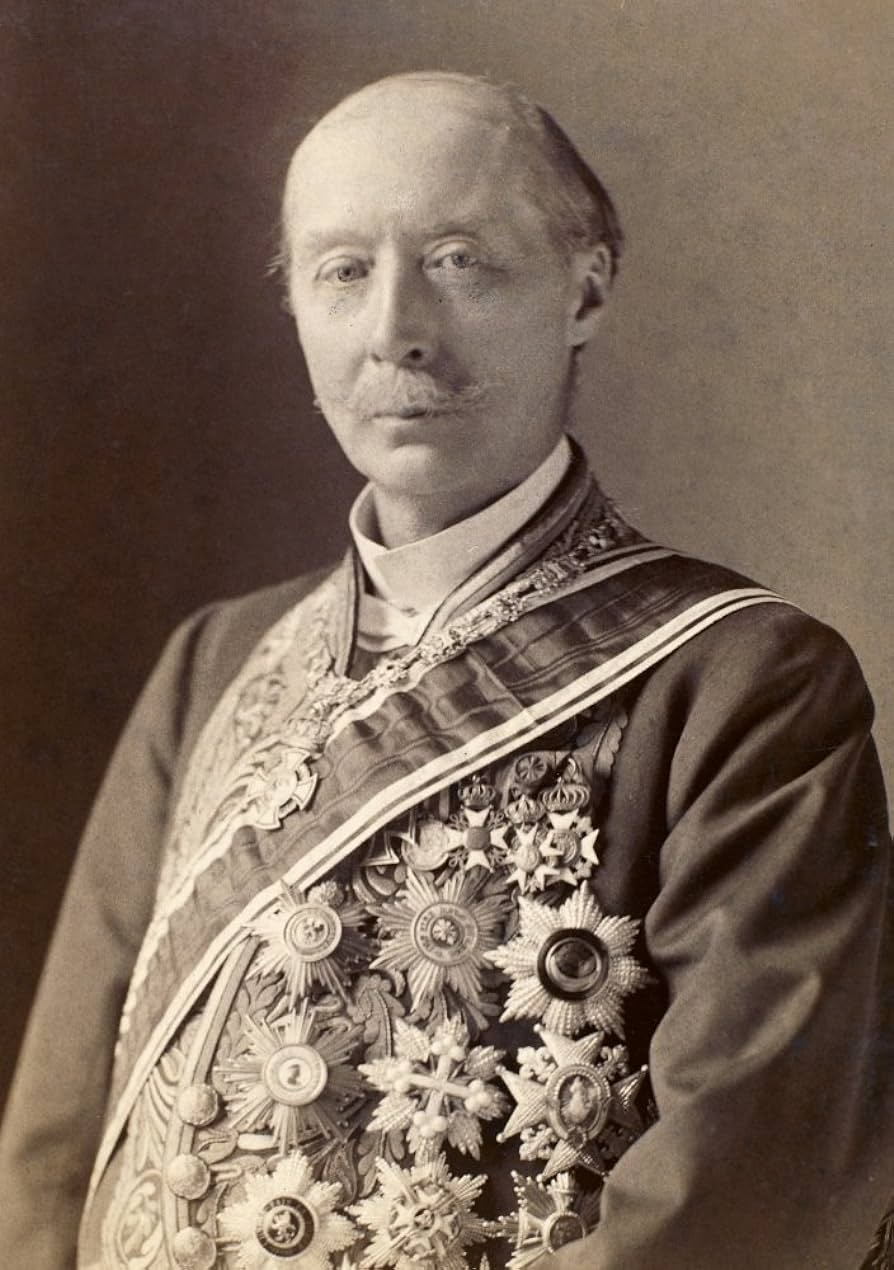

German Ambassador to the United Kingdom
- In office 23 November 1885 – 14 November 1901
- Monarchs: Wilhelm I Frederick III; Wilhelm II
- Preceded by: Georg Herbert zu Münster
- Succeeded by: Paul Wolff Metternich

State Secretary for Foreign Affairs
- In office 16 July 1881 – 24 October 1885
- Monarch: Wilhelm I
- Chancellor: Otto von Bismarck
- Preceded by: Clemens Busch
- Succeeded by: Herbert von Bismarck

German Ambassador to the Ottoman Empire
- In office 12 July 1878 – 15 July 1881
- Monarch: Wilhelm I
- Preceded by: Prince Heinrich VII Reuss of Köstritz
- Succeeded by: Joseph Maria von Radowitz

German Minister to Spain
- In office 20 August 1874 – 12 July 1878
- Monarch: Wilhelm I
- Preceded by: Julius von Canitz und Dallwitz
- Succeeded by: Eberhard zu Solms-Sonnenwalde

Personal details
- Born: 8 October 1831 Düsseldorf, Kingdom of Prussia, German Confederation
- Died: 22 November 1901 (aged 70) London, United Kingdom
- Spouse: Helene Moulton (m. 1863)
- Children: 3
- Parents: Edmund von Hatzfeldt-Wildenburg (father); Sophie von Hatzfeldt (mother)
- Relatives: Hermann von Hatzfeldt (cousin)
- Occupation: Diplomat

Melchior Hubert Paul Gustav Graf von Hatzfeldt-Wildenburg (8 October 1831 – 22 November 1901) was a German diplomat who served as ambassador to the United Kingdom from 1885 to 1901. He would also serve as envoy to Spain and the Ottoman Empire, foreign secretary, and head of the German Foreign Office. He is best known for signing the Yangtze Agreement in 1900.

== Early life ==
Born into the House of Hatzfeld, Paul was born in Düsseldorf, Kingdom of Prussia, a part of the German Confederation, on October 8, 1831. He was the son of Count Edmund Gottfried Cornelius Hubert von Hatzfeldt-Wildenburg (1798–1874) and his wife, Countess Sophie von Hatzfeldt-Trachenberg, member of another branch of the same noble family. In 1888 he would be appointed German ambassador to the United Kingdom, serving in this capacity until his retirement in 1901.

== Career ==
Hatzfeldt had a long career in the German Foreign Office. He was once described by Otto von Bismarck as das beste Pferd im diplomatischen Stall ("the best horse in the diplomatic stable"). The two had worked closely together, with Haztfeldt having served as serviced Bismarck's secretary in Paris during the latter's tenure as Prussian Ambassador to France in 1862. In 1874, Hatzfeldt was appointed as German Minister to Spain in Madrid, followed by Ambassador to the Ottoman Empire, before being recalled in 1881 to serve as foreign secretary and head of the Foreign Office. In 1885, he succeeded Count Münster as German ambassador to United Kingdom.

=== Wihlemine period ===
Coinciding with the ascension of Wilhelm II in 1888, the last decade of Haztfeldt's appointment to the Court of St. James's would see a deterioration of Anglo-German relations. The new Emperor's volatile, domineering, and possibly bipolar personality and aggressive foreign policy ("New Course") would result in a number of diplomatic incidents between Britain and Germany as tensions rose within the broader context of 19th century imperial rivalries. But while Wilhelm's foreign policy and personal behavior, especially towards to Britain and his British relatives, took on an increasingly hostile, confrontational, and unpredictable aspect, Hatzfeldt himself received little direction from Berlin. It should also be noted that at this time Bismarck himself was coming under mounting pressure. All of this put Hatzfeldt in a uniquely difficult position, and upon being summoned by his British counterparts to answer for his government and its head of state, the German ambassador could not always furnish them with a satisfying or even coherent explanation.

==== Role in the Vienna protocol incident ====
Less than two months after the death of Frederick III and the coronation of Wilhelm II in June, 1888, Hatzfeldt was caught in the middle of a disagreement between the new Emperor and Edward, Prince of Wales (later King Edward VII) in Vienna. Tensions between the two countries were already high due to Germany's attempts to acquire Zanzibar in East Africa through gunboat diplomacy. Although the Prince of Wales was his uncle, Wilhelm had unexpectedly refused to see him and acted prickly towards him and British diplomats Sir Leopold Swaine and Sir Augustus Paget. Afterwards, Hatzfeldt relayed to Lord Salisbury, Prime Minister of the United Kingdom, a terse note written by Bismarck, which simultaneously justified the Emperor's conduct as both a purely pragmatic diplomatic move directed towards appeasing Russia (Britain's greatest geopolitical adversary at the time) and, paradoxically, as a justified and completely reasonable response to a series of purported indiscretions on the part of Albert. But when Salisbury responded with Albert's side of the story, including details of the exchange not mentioned by Bismarck, Hatzfeldt claimed that it was "entirely new to him."

The affair enraged Queen Victoria (Edward's mother and Wilhelm's maternal grandmother) and in response Salisbury again summoned the German Ambassador. Baffling the Prime Minister, Hatzfeldt told him that since their last meeting he had communicated nothing of the matter to either Bismarck or Foreign Office. Likewise, Salisbury's warning to Hatzfeldt, that "England could not permit an attack on the Sultan of Zanzibar," did not reach Berlin. On October 22nd, 1888, Salisbury reported to the request that he believed Hatzfeldt did not do this "he was simply afraid to do so." Speaking in the customary third person, he adds that "from the hints [Hatzfeldt] let drop, Lord Salisbury gathered that the young Emperor was very difficult to manage, that Prince Bismarck was in great perplexity, and his temper had consequently become more than usually unbearable." The Prime Minister dryly concludes his report, noting that "Lord Salisbury's impression is that Count Hatzfeldt's position is very insecure."

=== Yangtze Agreement ===
As one of his final official actions as ambassador, Hatzfeldt signed the Yangtze Agreement in 1900, by which, in an attempt to relieve international tensions, both parties announced their opposition the official demarcation of spheres of influence in China. In 1897, it was reported that he would resign on account of ill-health, followed by similar reports in the years leading up to his actual retirement in November 1901, a few weeks before his death. He was succeeded by Count Paul Wolff Metternich.

=== Retirement ===
In his letter accepting Count von Hatzfeldt's request to retire, Emperor Wilhelm II wrote: "I feel impelled to express my imperial thanks for the excellent services which, during the forty-four years of your official life, you have rendered to my predecessors on the throne, to myself, and to the whole Fatherland." Upon his retirement, the Emperor bestowed on him the Order of Merit of the Prussian Crown as "a token of my good-will."

== Personal life ==
Hatzfeldt was married on 24 November 1863 in Paris Helene Moulton (3 September 1846 – 9 April 1918), the daughter of New York real estate speculator Charles Frederick Moulton and Cesarinne Jeanne (née Metz) Moulton. They divorced in 1886, but were remarried two years later so that their daughter might marry Prince Max of Hohenlohe-Öhringen. Together, they were the parents of:

- Helene Nelly Susanne Pauline Hubertine Luise (3 March 1865 – 21 May 1901), who married Prince Max Anthon Karl zu Hohenlohe-Öhringen (1860–1922), a son of Prince Hugo zu Hohenlohe-Öhringen and grandson of August, Prince of Hohenlohe-Öhringen.
- Paul Hermann Karl Hubert (30 June 1867 – 10 June 1941), a diplomat who married Baroness Maria von Stumm (1882–1954), daughter of diplomat Baron Ferdinand Eduard von Stumm.
- Marie Augusta Cesarinne Melanie (10 January 1871 – 15 April 1932), who married Prince Friedrich Karl zu Hohenlohe-Öhringen (1855–1910), brother of her sister's husband.

Count von Hatzfeldt died in London on 22 November 1901. In 1910, his son inherited the title and properties of Paul's nephew, Prince Franz von Hatzfeldt-Wildenburg. (Note: Prince Franz Edmund von Hatzfeldt-Wildenburg (1853–1910) was married to Clara Elizabeth Prentice, the adopted daughter of American financier Collis P. Huntington, in 1889.)

== Honours ==
He received the following orders and decorations:

=== German ===
- Kingdom of Prussia:
  - Iron Cross (1870), 2nd Class on White Band with Black Edge
  - Knight of the Red Eagle, 1st Class, 5 June 1881; Grand Cross, 18 January 1888
  - Grand Commander's Cross of the Royal House Order of Hohenzollern, 28 October 1885
  - Knight of the Black Eagle, 18 June 1890; with Collar, 17 January 1891
  - Knight of Merit of the Prussian Crown, 8 November 1901 – on his resignation as German Ambassador to London
- Baden: Knight of the Order of Berthold the First
- Kingdom of Bavaria:
  - Grand Cross of the Merit Order of St. Michael, 1877
  - Grand Cross of Merit of the Bavarian Crown, 1883
- Brunswick: Grand Cross of the Order of Henry the Lion
- Mecklenburg: Grand Cross of the Wendish Crown, with Golden Crown
- Saxe-Weimar-Eisenach: Grand Cross of the White Falcon
- Kingdom of Saxony: Grand Cross of the Albert Order, with Golden Star, 1887
- Württemberg: Grand Cross of the Württemberg Crown

=== Foreign ===
- (Austrian Empire) (Kingdom of Hungary) Austria-Hungary: Grand Cross of the Imperial Order of Leopold, 1881
- Belgium: Grand Cordon of the Order of Leopold
- Kingdom of Greece: Grand Cross of the Redeemer
- Kingdom of Italy:
  - Grand Cross of Saints Maurice and Lazarus
  - Grand Officer of the Crown of Italy
- Sovereign Military Order of Malta: Grand Cross of Honour and Devotion
- Netherlands: Knight of the Netherlands Lion
- Ottoman Empire: Order of Osmanieh, 1st Class in Diamonds
- Kingdom of Romania: Grand Cross of the Star of Romania
- Russian Empire: Knight of the White Eagle
- Spain: Grand Cross of the Order of Charles III, with Collar, 28 May 1877
- Kingdom of Serbia: Grand Cross of the Cross of Takovo
- (Thailand) Siam: Grand Cross of the Crown of Siam
- (Kingdom of the Two Sicilies) Two Sicilian Royal Family: Knight of St. Ferdinand and Merit

== Ancestry ==
Ancestors of Paul von Hatzfeldt

8. Edmund Gottfried Wilhelm, Count of Hatzfeldt-Wildenburg
4. Edmund Karl Eugen, Count of Hatzfeldt-Wildenburg
9. Baroness Maria Anna Antonia von Cortenbach
2. Edmund Gottfried Cornelius, Count of Hatzfeldt-Wildenburg
10. Baron Klemens August von Hersell
5. Baroness Friederike von Hersell
11. Baroness Anna Maria von Bourscheidt-Burgbrohl
1. Paul, Count of Hatzfeldt-Wildenburg
12. Karl Ferdinand, Count of Hatzfeldt-Wildenburg
6. Franz Ludwig, Prince of Hatzfeldt-Trachenberg
13. Baroness Maria Anna Elisabeth von Venningen
3. Countess Sophie von Hatzfeldt-Trachenberg
14. Count Friedrich Wilhelm von der Schulenburg-Kehnert
7. Countess Friederike Karoline von der Schulenburg-Kehnert
15. Helene Sophie Wilhelmine von Arnstedt

== Sources ==
- Hermann von Eckardstein. Lebenserinnerungen u. Politische Denkwürdigkeiten. Leipzig: Verlag Paul List, 1919.
- Vera Niehus: Ein »ambassadeur idéal«, jedoch »den Anstrengungen des ministeriellen Dienstes nicht gewachsen«: Paul von Hatzfeldt als außenpolitischer Mitarbeiter Bismarcks. In: Lothar Gall, Ulrich Lappenküper (Hrsg.): Bismarcks Mitarbeiter. Schöningh, Paderborn 2009, ISBN 978-3-506-76591-8.
- Franz-Eugen Volz: Paul Graf von Hatzfeldt-Wildenburg. In: Lebensbilder aus dem Kreis Altenkirchen. Altenkirchen, 1975.
