= Boxer Rebellion =

1899–1901 anti-foreign uprising in China

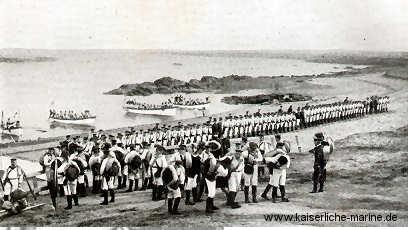
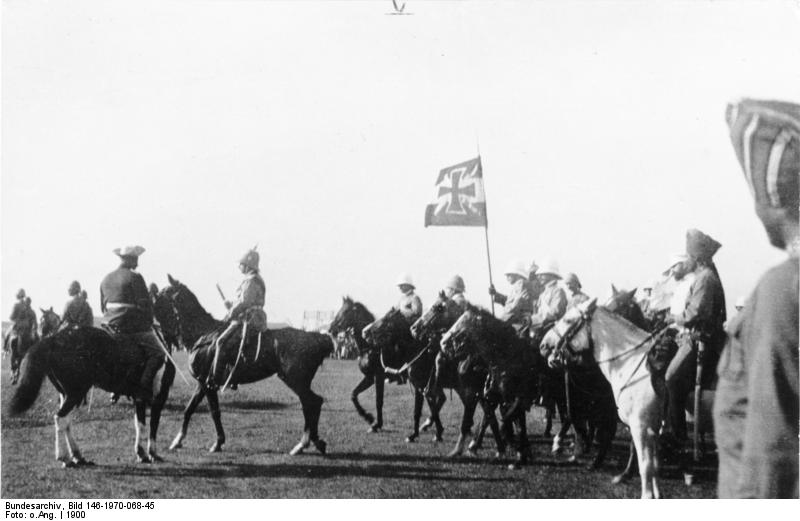
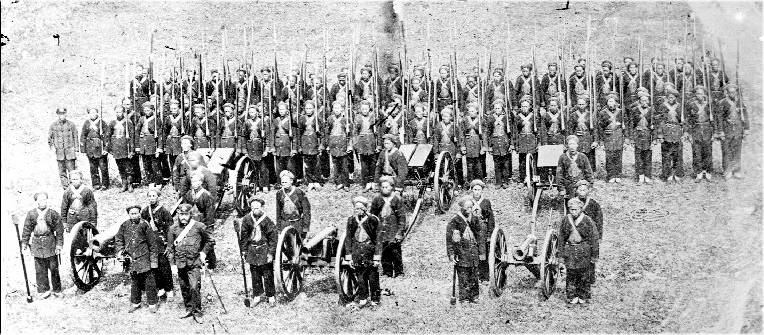
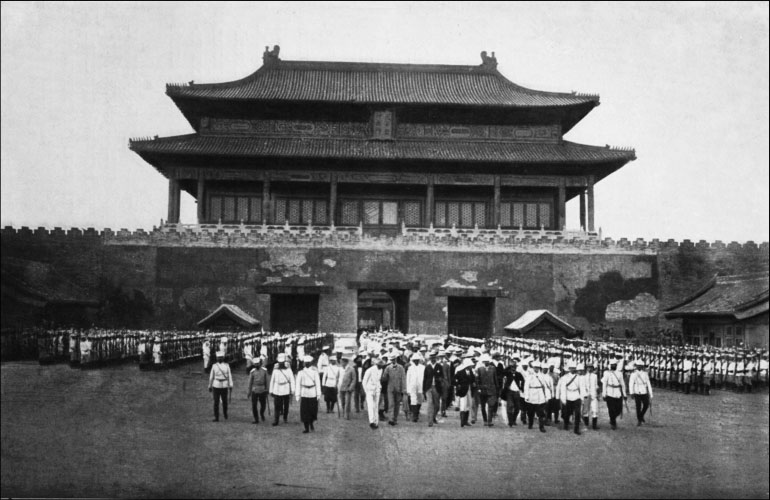
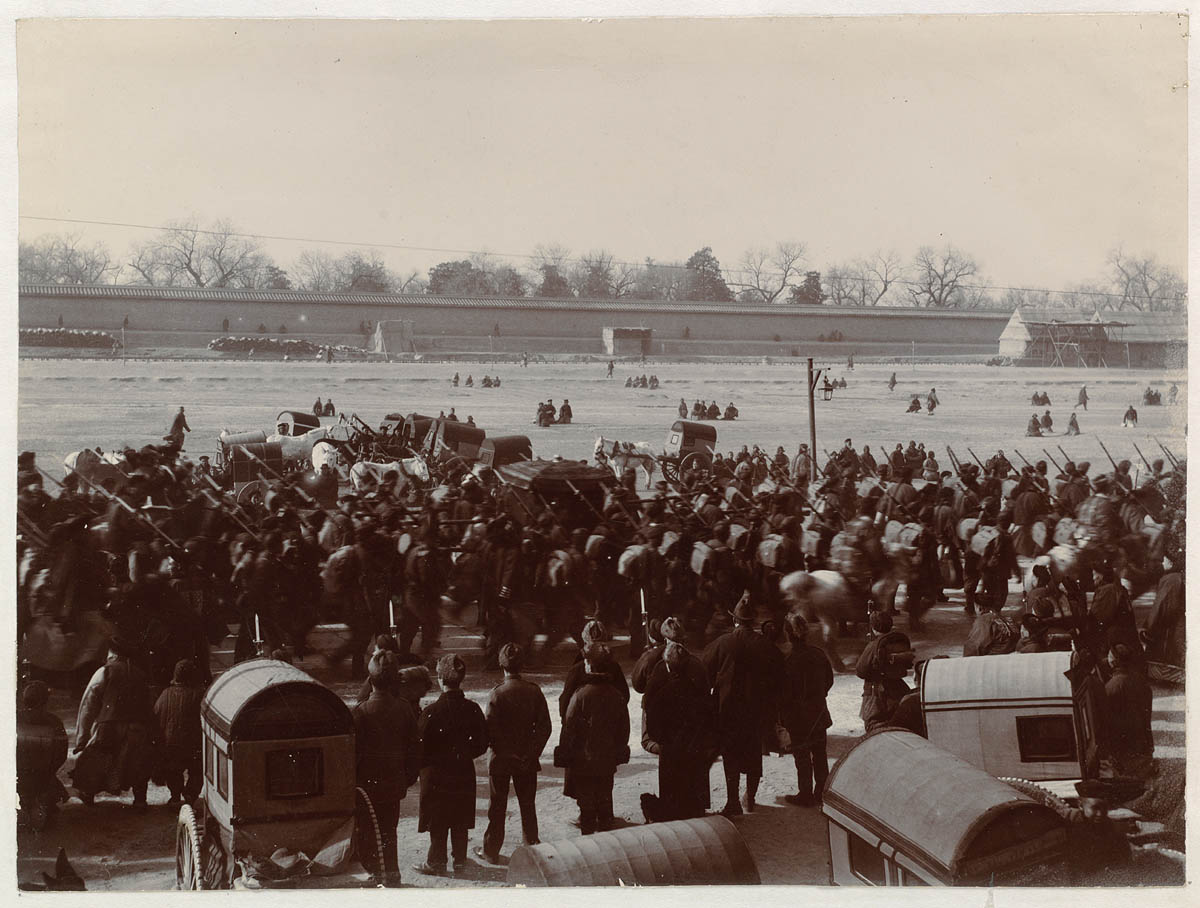
- Clockwise: Alliance landed at Taku Forts; Chief Commander Alfred von Waldersee inspecting the army; Boxer Army; Empress Dowager Cixi fled to Xi'an; Alliance entering Forbidden City after the Battle of Beijing
Date	17 September 1899 – 7 September 1901 (1 year, 11 months, 1 week, and 3 days)
Location	North China, Yellow Sea
Result	Eight-Nation Alliance victory: Boxer Protocol signed

Belligerents
Eight-Nation Alliance; United Kingdom; Russia; Japan; France; Germany; United States; Italy; Austria-Hungary; Netherlands; Spain; Belgium; Portugal; (Qing dynasty) Mutual Defence Pact of Southeast China (after 1900)	Boxers; Qing Dynasty (after 1900)

Commanders and leaders
Legations (United Kingdom of Great Britain and Ireland) Claude MacDonald Seymour Expedition (United Kingdom of Great Britain and Ireland) Edward Seymour Gaselee Expedition (United Kingdom of Great Britain and Ireland) Alfred Gaselee (Russian Empire) Yevgeni Alekseyev (Russian Empire) Nikolai Linevich (Empire of Japan) Fukushima Yasumasa (Empire of Japan) Yamaguchi Motomi (French Third Republic) Henri-Nicolas Frey (United States) Adna Chaffee Occupation Force (German Empire) Alfred von Waldersee Manchuria occupation (Russian Empire) Aleksey Kuropatkin (Russian Empire) Paul von Rennenkampf Pavel Mishchenko Mutual Defence Pact (Qing dynasty) Yuan Shikai (Qing dynasty) Li Hongzhang (Qing dynasty) Liu Kunyi (Qing dynasty) Zhang Zhidong	Boxer movement Cao Futian (executed) Lin Hei'er (POW) Zhang Decheng † Zhao Sanduo Imperial government Guangxu Emperor Empress Dowager Cixi (Qing dynasty) Yuxian (executed) Commander-in-chief (Qing dynasty) Ronglu Hushenying (Qing dynasty) Zaiyi Tenacious Army (Qing dynasty) Nie Shicheng † Resolute Army (Qing dynasty) Ma Yukun Gansu Army (Qing dynasty) Dong Fuxiang

Strength
Seymour Expedition 2,100‍–‍2,188 Gaselee Expedition 18,000 China Relief Expedition 2,500 Russian troops 58,000 to 100,000 or 200,000	Boxers 100,000‍–‍300,000 Qing troops 100,000

Casualties and losses
- 32,000 Chinese Christians and 200 Western missionaries (northern China); 100,000 total deaths

Boxer Rebellion

Chinese name
- Traditional Chinese: 義和團運動
- Simplified Chinese: 义和团运动
- Literal meaning: Militia united in righteousness movement
Transcriptions
Standard Mandarin
- Hanyu Pinyin: Yìhétuán yùndòng
- Bopomofo: ㄧˋ ㄏㄜˊ ㄊㄨㄢˊ ㄩㄣˋ ㄉㄨㄥˋ
- Wade–Giles: I^{4}-ho^{2}-t'uan^{2} yün^{4}-tung^{4}
- Tongyong Pinyin: Yì-hé-tuán yùn-dòng
- IPA: [î.xɤ̌.tʰwǎn ŷn.tʊ̂ŋ]
Yue: Cantonese
- Yale Romanization: Yih-wòh-tyùhn wahn-duhng
- Jyutping: Ji6 wo4 tyun4 wan6 dung6
- IPA: [ji˨ wɔ˩ tʰyn˩ wɐn˨ tʊŋ˨]

Manchu name
- Manchu script: ᠴᡳᠣᠸᠠᠨ ᠰᡝᡵᡝ ᡝᡥᡝ ᡥᡡᠯᡥᠠ ᡳ ᡶᠠᠴᡠᡥᡡᠨ
- Möllendorff: ciowan sere ehe hūlha i facuhūn

The Boxer Rebellion, also known as the Boxer Uprising, Boxer Movement, Yihetuan Movement (traditional Chinese: 義和團運動; simplified Chinese: 义和团运动), or Boxer War, was an uprising in North China between 1899 and 1901, towards the end of the Qing dynasty, by the Society of Righteous and Harmonious Fists. Its members were known as the "Boxers" in English, owing to many of them practicing Chinese martial arts, which at the time were referred to as "Chinese boxing". It was defeated by the Eight-Nation Alliance of foreign powers.

Following the First Sino-Japanese War, villagers in North China feared the expansion of foreign spheres of influence and resented Christian missionaries who ignored local customs and used their power to protect their followers in court. In 1898, North China experienced natural disasters, including the Yellow River flooding and droughts, which Boxers blamed on foreign and Christian influence. Beginning in 1899, the movement spread across Shandong and the North China Plain, destroying foreign property such as railroads, and attacking or murdering Chinese Christians and missionaries. The events came to a head in June 1900, when Boxer fighters, convinced they were invulnerable to foreign weapons, converged on Beijing with the slogan "Support the Qing government and destroy the foreigners".

Diplomats, missionaries, soldiers, and some Chinese Christians took refuge in the Legation Quarter, which the Boxers besieged. The Eight-Nation Alliance—comprising American, Austro-Hungarian, British, French, German, Italian, Japanese, and Russian troops—invaded China to lift the siege; and on June 17 stormed the Dagu Fort at Tianjin. Empress Dowager Cixi, who had initially been hesitant, supported the Boxers and on June 21 issued an imperial decree that was a de facto declaration of war on the invading powers. Chinese officialdom was split between those supporting the Boxers and those favouring conciliation, led by Prince Qing. The supreme commander of the Chinese forces, the Manchu general Ronglu, later claimed he acted to protect the foreigners. Officials in the southern provinces ignored the imperial order to fight against foreigners.

The Eight-Nation Alliance, after initially being turned back by the Imperial Chinese military and Boxer militia, brought 20,000 armed troops to China. They defeated the Imperial Army in Tianjin and arrived in Beijing on 14 August, relieving the 55-day Siege of the International Legations. Plunder and looting of the capital and the surrounding countryside ensued, along with summary execution of those suspected of being Boxers in retribution. The Boxer Protocol of 7 September 1901 provided for the execution of government officials who had supported the Boxers, for foreign troops to be stationed in Beijing, and for 450 million taels of silver—more than the government's annual tax revenue—to be paid as indemnity over the course of the next 39 years to the eight invading nations. The Qing dynasty's handling of the Boxer Rebellion further weakened both their credibility and control over China, and led to the Late Qing reforms, and to a greater extent the Xinhai Revolution.

== Background ==
=== Origin of the Boxers ===
The Righteous and Harmonious Fists arose in the inland sections of the northern coastal province of Shandong, a region which had long been plagued by social unrest, religious sects, and martial societies. American Christian missionaries were probably the first people who referred to the well-trained, athletic young men as the "Boxers", because of the martial arts which they practised and the weapons training which they underwent. Their primary practice was a type of spiritual possession which involved the whirling of swords, violent prostrations, and incantations to deities.

The opportunities to fight against Western encroachment were especially attractive to unemployed village men, many of whom were teenagers. The tradition of possession and invulnerability went back several hundred years but took on special meaning against the powerful new weapons of the West. The Boxers, armed with rifles and swords, claimed supernatural invulnerability against cannons, rifle shots, and knife attacks. The Boxer groups popularly claimed that millions of soldiers would descend out of heaven to assist them in purifying China of foreign oppression. Members demonstrated their claimed invulnerability to new initiates by firing guns loaded with blank rounds at one another.

In 1895, despite ambivalence toward their heterodox practices, Yuxian, a Manchu who was the then prefect of Cao Prefecture and would later become provincial governor, cooperated with the Big Swords Society, whose original purpose was to fight bandits. The German Catholic missionaries of the Society of the Divine Word had built up their presence in the area, partially by taking in a significant portion of converts who were "in need of protection from the law". On one occasion in 1895, a large bandit gang defeated by the Big Swords Society claimed to be Catholics to avoid prosecution. "The line between Christians and bandits became increasingly indistinct", remarks historian Paul Cohen.

Some missionaries such as Georg Maria Stenz also used their privileges to intervene in lawsuits. The Big Swords responded by attacking Catholic properties and burning them. As a result of diplomatic pressure in the capital, Yuxian executed several Big Sword leaders but did not punish anyone else. More martial secret societies started emerging after this.

The early years saw a variety of village activities, not a broad movement with a united purpose. Martial folk-religious societies such as the Baguadao ('Eight Trigrams') prepared the way for the Boxers. Like the Red Boxing school or the Plum Flower tradition, the Boxers of Shandong were more concerned with traditional social and moral values, such as filial piety, than with foreign influences. One leader, Zhu Hongdeng (Red Lantern Zhu), started as a wandering healer, specialising in skin ulcers, and gained wide respect by refusing payment for his treatments. Zhu claimed descent from Ming dynasty emperors, since his surname was the surname of the Ming imperial family. He announced that his goal was to "Revive the Qing and destroy the foreigners" (扶清滅洋 fu Qing mie yang).

The enemy was seen as foreign influence. They decided the "primary devils" were the Christian missionaries while the "secondary devils" were the Chinese converts to Christianity, which both had either to repent, be driven out or killed.

=== Causes ===
The movement had multiple causes, both domestic and international. Escalating tensions caused Chinese to turn against "foreign devils" who engaged in the Scramble for China in the late 19th century. The Western success at controlling China, growing anti-imperialist sentiment, and extreme weather conditions sparked the movement. A drought followed by floods in Shandong province in 1897–98 forced farmers to flee to cities and seek food.

The Sanmen Bay Affair greatly influenced the Boxer Rebellion. It was the only time where the Qing Dynasty refused to concede to any European colonial power. After this event, the government shifted to supporting the Boxer uprising against foreign invaders and the proliferation of Christianity within China.

A major source of discontent in northern China was missionary activity. The Boxers opposed German missionaries in Shandong and in the German concession in Qingdao. The Treaty of Tientsin and the Convention of Peking, signed in 1860 after the Second Opium War, had granted foreign missionaries the freedom to preach anywhere in China and to buy land on which to build churches. There was strong public indignation over the dispossession of Chinese temples that were replaced by Catholic churches which were viewed as deliberately anti–feng shui. Some Chinese linked this to the drought, contending that the drought had been influenced by Christian church placement and design violating principles of feng shui, as well as influenced Chinese Christians by not worshipping local deities.

A further cause of discontent among Chinese people was the destruction of Chinese burial sites to make way for German railroads and telegraph lines. In response to Chinese protests against German railroads, Germans shot the protestors.

Economic conditions in Shandong also contributed to rebellion. Northern Shandong's economy focused significantly on cotton production and was hampered by the importation of foreign cotton. Traffic along the Grand Canal was also decreasing, further eroding the economy. The area had also experienced periods of drought and flood.

A major precipitating incident was anger at German Catholic priest Father Stenz, who had allegedly serially raped Chinese women in Juye County, Shandong. In a November 1897 attack known as the Juye Incident, Chinese rebels attempted to kill Stenz in his missionary quarters, but failed to find him and killed two other missionaries. The German Navy's East Asia Squadron was dispatched to occupy Jiaozhou Bay on the southern coast of the Shandong peninsula.

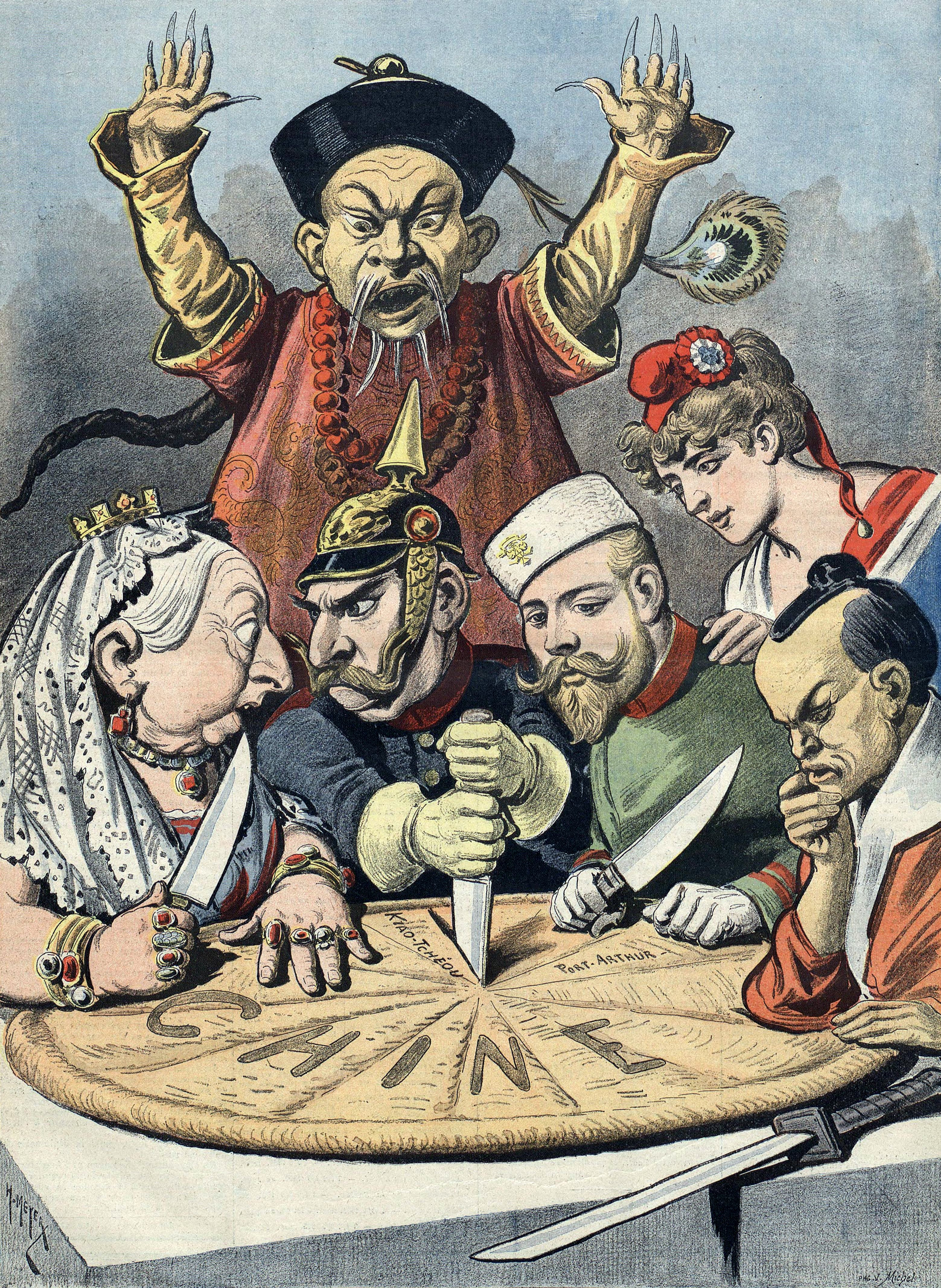
A French political cartoon of 1898 depicting China as a pie about to be carved up by Queen Victoria (United Kingdom), Kaiser Wilhelm II (Germany), Tsar Nicholas II (Russia), Marianne (France) and a samurai (Japan), while a stereotypical Qing official (Li Hongzhang) protests but is powerless.

In December 1897, Wilhelm declared his intent to seize territory in China, which triggered a "scramble for concessions" by which Britain, France, Russia and Japan also secured their own sphere of influence in China. Germany gained exclusive control of developmental loans, mining, and railway ownership in Shandong province. Russia gained influence of all territory north of the Great Wall, plus the previous tax exemption for trade in Mongolia and Xinjiang, economic powers similar to Germany's over Fengtian, Jilin and Heilongjiang. France gained influence of Yunnan, most of Guangxi and Guangdong, Japan over Fujian. Britain gained influence of the whole Yangtze valley (defined as all provinces adjoining the Yangtze, as well as Henan and Zhejiang), parts of Guangdong and Guangxi provinces and part of Tibet. Only Italy's request for Zhejiang was declined by the Chinese government. These do not include the lease and concession territories where the foreign powers had full authority. The Russian government militarily occupied their zone, imposed their law and schools, seized mining and logging privileges, settled their citizens, and even established their municipal administration on several cities.

In October 1898, a group of Boxers attacked the Christian community of Liyuantun village where a temple to the Jade Emperor had been converted into a Catholic church. Disputes had surrounded the church since 1869, when the temple had been granted to the Christian residents of the village. This incident marked the first time the Boxers used the slogan "Support the Qing, destroy the foreigners" (扶清滅洋; fu Qing mie yang) that later characterised them.

The Boxers called themselves the "Militia United in Righteousness" for the first time in October 1899, at the Battle of Senluo Temple, a clash between Boxers and Qing government troops. By using the word "Militia" rather than "Boxers", they distanced themselves from forbidden martial arts sects and tried to give their movement the legitimacy of a group that defended orthodoxy.

Violence toward missionaries and Christians drew sharp responses from diplomats protecting their nationals, including Western seizure of harbours and forts and the moving in of troops in preparation for all-out war, as well as taking control of more land by force or by coerced long-term leases from the Qing. In 1899, the French minister in Beijing helped the missionaries to obtain an edict granting official status to every order in the Roman Catholic hierarchy, enabling local priests to support their people in legal or family disputes and bypass the local officials. After the German government took over Shandong, many Chinese feared that the foreign missionaries and possibly all Christian activities were imperialist attempts at "carving the melon", i.e., colonising China piece by piece. A Chinese official expressed the animosity towards foreigners succinctly, "Take away your missionaries and your opium and you will be welcome."

In 1899, the Boxer Rebellion developed into a mass movement. The previous year, the Hundred Days' Reform, in which progressive Chinese reformers persuaded the Guangxu Emperor to engage in modernizing efforts, was suppressed by Empress Dowager Cixi and Yuan Shikai. The Qing political elite struggled with the question of how to retain its power. The Qing government came to view the Boxers as a means to help oppose foreign powers. The national crisis was widely perceived as caused by "foreign aggression" inside. The Qing government was corrupt, common people often faced extortion from government officials, and the national government offered no protection from the violent actions of the Boxers.

== Qing forces ==
The military of the Qing dynasty had been dealt a severe blow by the First Sino-Japanese War and this had prompted military reform that was still in its early stages when the Boxer rebellion occurred and they were expected to fight. The bulk of the fighting was conducted by the forces already around Zhili with troops from other provinces only arriving after the main fighting had ended.

Estimates of Qing strength 1898–1900
Army	The Boards of War/Revenue (field troops only)	Russian General Staff (field troops only)	E.H. Parker (Zhili alone)	The London Times (Zhili alone)
Total	360,000	205,000	125,000–130,000	110,000–140,000

The failure of the Qing forces to withstand the Allied forces was not surprising given the limited time for reform and the fact that the best troops of China were not committed to the fight, remaining instead in Huguang and Shandong. The officer corps was particularly deficient; many lacked basic knowledge of strategy and tactics, and even those with training had not actively commanded troops in the field. In addition, the regular soldiers were noted for their poor marksmanship and inaccuracy, while cavalry was ill-organised and was not used to its full extent. Tactically, the Chinese still retained their belief in the superiority of defence, often withdrawing as soon as they were flanked, a tendency attributable to their lack of combat experience and training as well as a lack of initiative from commanders who would rather retreat than counterattack. However, accusations of cowardice were minimal; this was a marked improvement from the Sino-Japanese War of 1894–1895, as Chinese troops did not flee en masse as before. If led by courageous officers, the troops would often fight to the death as occurred under Nie Shicheng and Ma Yukun.

On the other hand, Chinese artillery was well-regarded, and caused far more casualties than the infantry at Tientsin, proving themselves superior to Allied artillery in counter-battery fire. The infantry, for their part, were commended for their good usage of cover and concealment in addition to their tenacity in resistance.

== Boxer War ==
=== Intensifying crisis ===
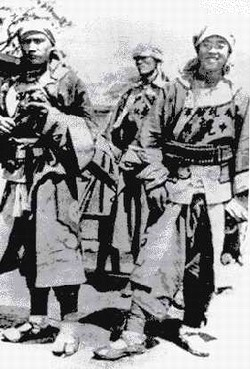
Chinese Muslim troops from Gansu, known as the Gansu Braves

In December 1899, the Qing court responded to foreign pressure by removing Yuxian as governor of Shandong and replacing him with Yuan Shikai, who sought to suppress the movement. Yuxian, now governor of Shanxi following his removal in Shandong, continued to support the movement.

In January 1900, with a majority of conservatives in the imperial court, Cixi changed her position on the Boxers and issued edicts in their defence, causing protests from foreign powers. Cixi urged provincial authorities to support the Boxers, although few did so. In the spring of 1900, the Boxer movement spread rapidly north from Shandong into the countryside near Beijing. Boxers burned Christian churches, killed Chinese Christians and intimidated Chinese officials who stood in their way. American Minister Edwin H. Conger cabled Washington, "the whole country is swarming with hungry, discontented, hopeless idlers".

In April 1900, foreign warships took up stations in Bohai Bay as a show of force.

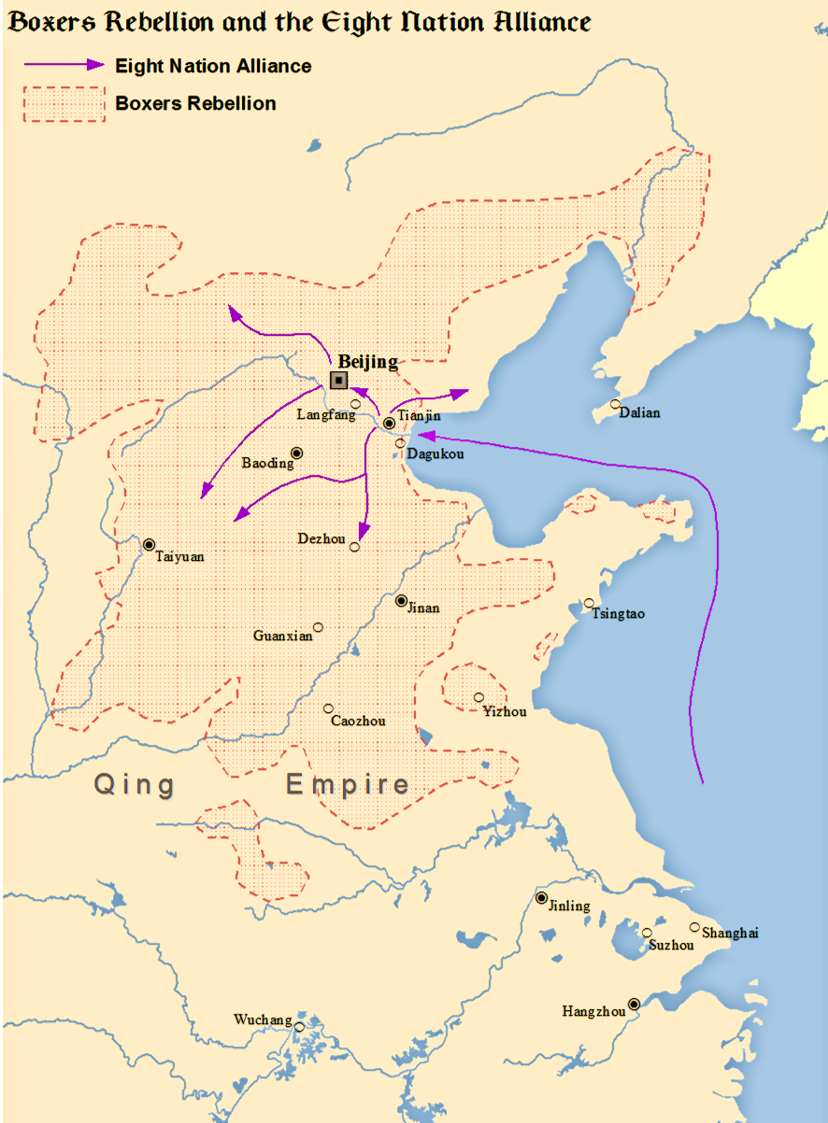
Movement of Boxers and Alliance forces during the rebellion

On 30 May the diplomats, led by British Minister Claude Maxwell MacDonald, requested that foreign soldiers come to Beijing to defend the legations. The Chinese government reluctantly acquiesced, and the next day a multinational force of 435 navy troops from eight countries debarked from warships and travelled by train from the Taku Forts to Beijing. They set up defensive perimeters around their respective missions.

On 5 June 1900, the railway line to Tianjin was cut by Boxers in the countryside, and Beijing was isolated. On 11 June, at Yongdingmen, the secretary of the Japanese legation, Sugiyama Akira, was attacked and killed by the forces of General Dong Fuxiang, who were guarding the southern part of the Beijing walled city. Armed with Mauser rifles but wearing traditional uniforms, Dong's troops had threatened the foreign legations in the fall of 1898 soon after arriving in Beijing, so much that United States Marines had been called to Beijing to guard the legations.

Wilhelm was so alarmed by the Chinese Muslim troops that he requested Ottoman caliph Abdul Hamid II to find a way to stop the Muslim troops from fighting. Abdul Hamid agreed to the Kaiser's request and sent Enver Pasha (not to be confused with the later Young Turk leader) to China in 1901, but the rebellion was over by that time.

On 11 June, the first Boxer was seen in the Peking Legation Quarter. On 12 June, the German Minister Clemens von Ketteler assaulted a suspected Boxer who fled and captured a suspected Boxer boy in the cart, who would be later reportedly killed on 16 June, alledgedly by Kettler in a fit of rage. In response to the incident on 12th, thousands of Boxers burst into the walled city of Beijing that afternoon and burned many of the Christian churches and cathedrals in the city, burning some victims alive. American and British missionaries took refuge in the Methodist Mission, and an attack there was repulsed by US Marines. The soldiers at the British Embassy and German legations shot and killed several Boxers. The Kansu Braves and Boxers, along with other Chinese, then attacked and killed Chinese Christians around the legations in revenge for foreign attacks on Chinese. Foreign legation guards shot indiscriminately at Chinese with no effort to distinguish Boxers from uninvolved city residents.

During the intensive phase of the Boxer Uprising, the interim government of Macau stressed the need for reinforcements from Portugal. Telegraphic messages sent from Macau to Lisbon in June 1900 reported the situation in China and called for additional arms and recruitment of militia. An expeditionary force later arrived in Macau in August under Major António de Varnhagen Moraes Bessa. It comprised a company of 300 gunners, a battery with six Krupp artillery pieces and three Hotchkiss guns, as well as medical and administrative personnel. In July, an incident at the Portas do Cerco resulted in two days of exchange of fire between the Portuguese and Chinese garrisons across the frontier, although neither side moved troops across it. Portuguese property in northern China was also damaged during the uprising, including the library of the Portuguese consulate in Tianjin. Compensation was raised during the Boxer Protocol negotiations but was ultimately omitted from the final treaty.

=== Seymour Expedition ===
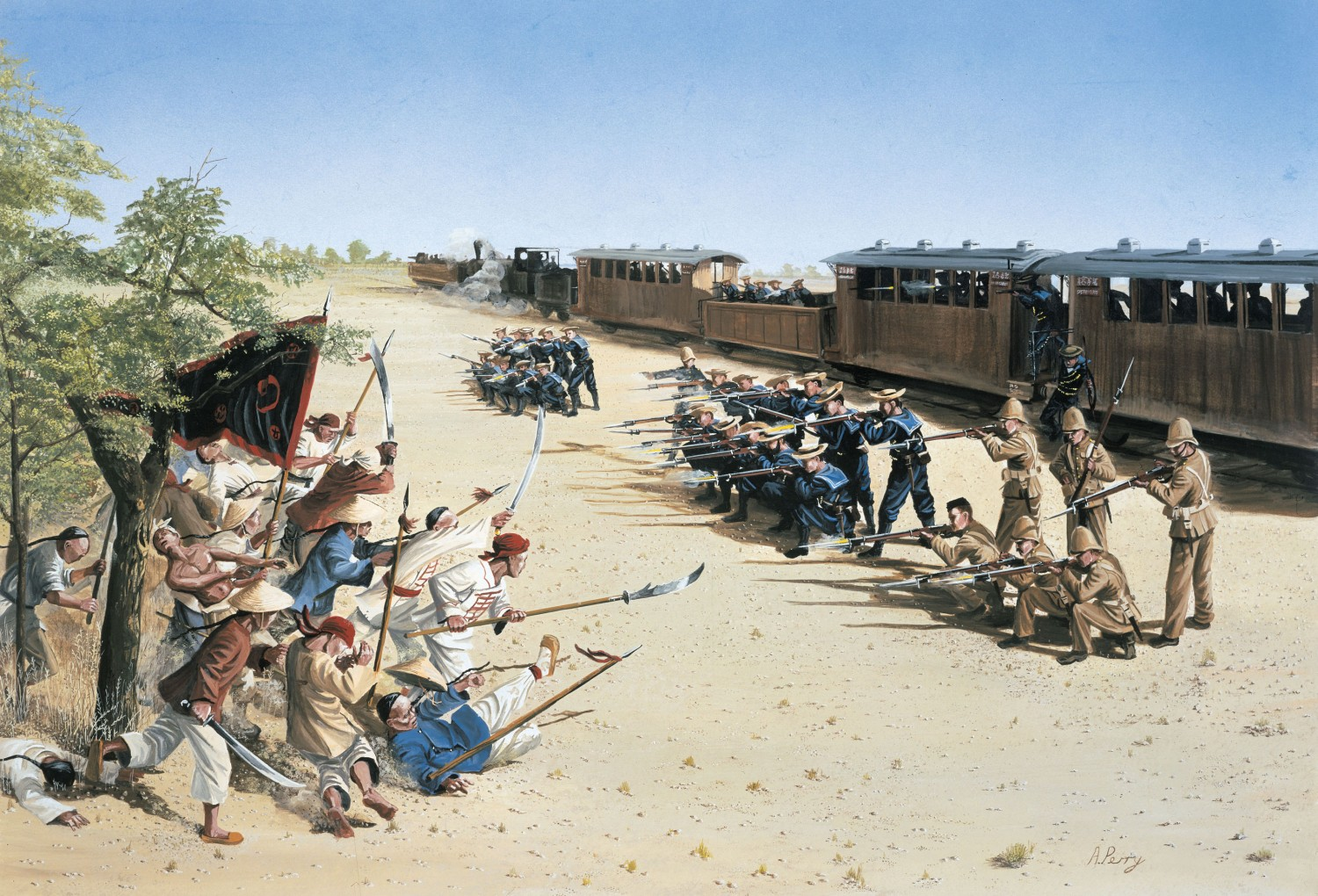
1900 illustration of the Battle of Langfang

As the situation grew more violent, the Eight Powers authorities at Dagu dispatched a second multinational force to Beijing on 10 June 1900. This force of 2,000 sailors and marines was under the command of Vice Admiral Edward Hobart Seymour, the largest contingent being British. The force moved by train from Dagu to Tianjin with the agreement of the Chinese government, but the railway between Tianjin and Beijing had been severed. Seymour resolved to continue forward by rail to the break and repair the railway, or progress on foot from there, if necessary, as it was only 120 km from Tianjin to Beijing. The court then replaced Prince Qing at the Zongli Yamen with Manchu Prince Duan, a member of the imperial Aisin Gioro clan (foreigners called him a "Blood Royal"), who was anti-foreigner and pro-Boxer. He soon ordered the Imperial army to attack the foreign forces. Confused by conflicting orders from Beijing, General Nie Shicheng let Seymour's army pass by in their trains.

After leaving Tianjin, the force quickly reached Langfang, but the railway was destroyed there. Seymour's engineers tried to repair the line, but the force found itself surrounded, as the railway in both behind directions was destroyed. They were attacked from all sides by Chinese irregulars and imperial troops. Five thousand of Dong Fuxiang's Gansu Braves and an unknown number of Boxers won a costly but major victory over Seymour's troops at the Battle of Langfang on 18 June. The Seymour force could not locate the Chinese artillery, which was raining shells upon their positions. Chinese troops employed mining, engineering, flooding, and simultaneous attacks. The Chinese also employed pincer movements, ambushes, and sniping with some success.

On 18 June, Seymour learned of attacks on the Legation Quarter in Beijing, and decided to continue advancing, this time along the Beihe River, toward Tongzhou, 25 km (16 mi) from Beijing. By 19 June, the force was halted by progressively stiffening resistance and started to retreat southward along the river with over 200 wounded. The force was now very low on food, ammunition, and medical supplies. They happened upon The Great Hsi-Ku Arsenal, a hidden Qing munitions cache of which the Eight Powers had had no knowledge until then.

There they dug in and awaited rescue. A Chinese servant slipped through the Boxer and Imperial lines, reached Tianjin, and informed the Eight Powers of Seymour's predicament. His force was surrounded by Imperial troops and Boxers, attacked nearly around the clock, and at the point of being overrun. The Eight Powers sent a relief column from Tianjin of 1,800 men (900 Russian troops from Port Arthur, 500 British seamen, and other assorted troops). On 25 June the relief column reached Seymour. The Seymour force destroyed the Arsenal: they spiked the captured field guns and set fire to any munitions that they could not take (an estimated £3 million worth). The Seymour force and the relief column marched back to Tientsin, unopposed, on 26 June. Seymour's casualties during the expedition were 62 killed and 228 wounded.

=== Conflict within the Qing imperial court ===
Meanwhile, in Beijing, on 16 June, Empress Dowager Cixi summoned the imperial court for a mass audience and addressed the choice between using the Boxers to evict the foreigners from the city, and seeking a diplomatic solution. In response to a high official who doubted the efficacy of the Boxers, Cixi replied that both sides of the debate at the imperial court realised that popular support for the Boxers in the countryside was almost universal and that suppression would be both difficult and unpopular, especially when foreign troops were on the march.

=== Siege of the Beijing legations ===
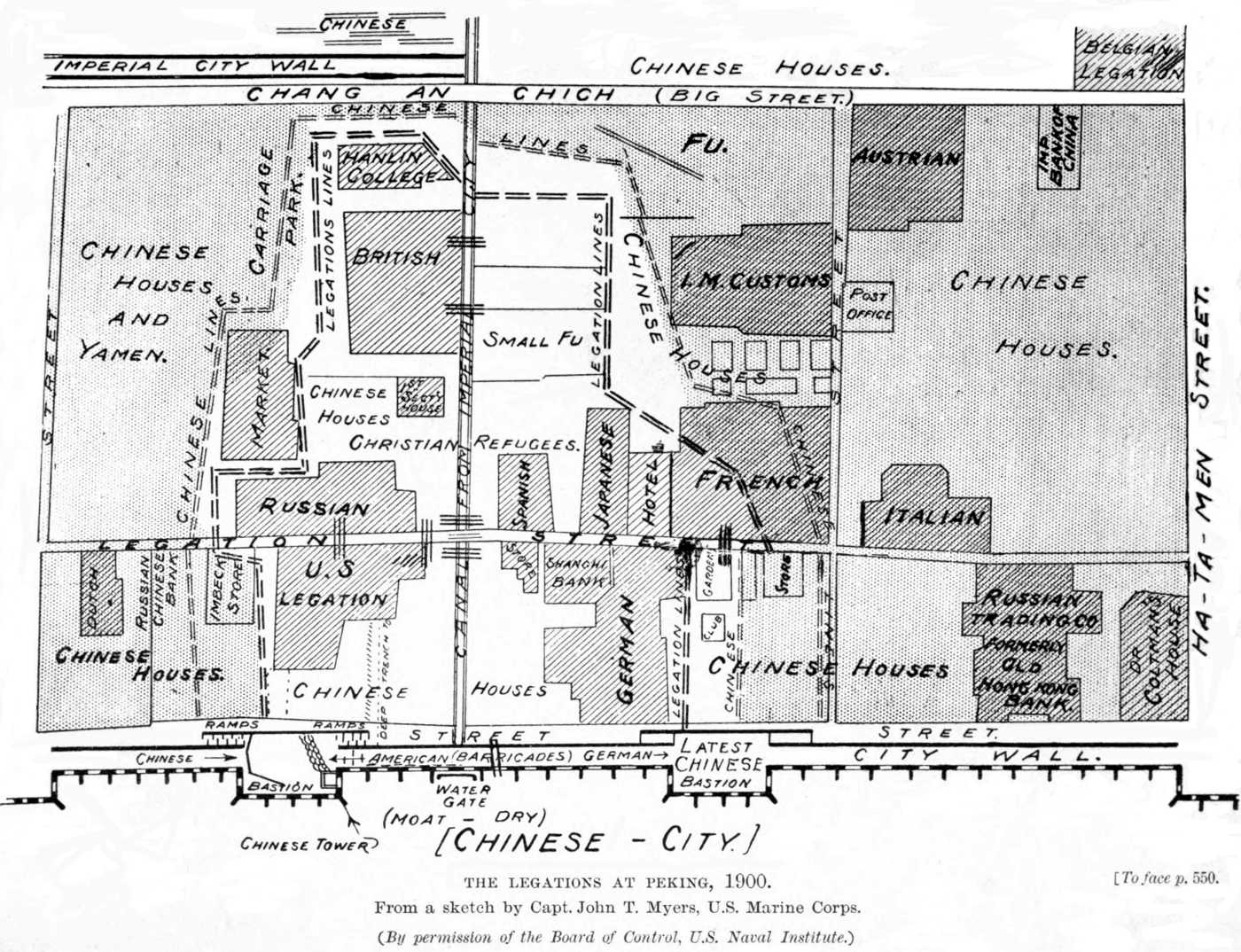
Locations of foreign diplomatic legations and front lines in Beijing during the siege

On 15 June, Qing imperial forces deployed electric naval mines in the Beihe River to prevent the Eight-Nation Alliance from sending ships to attack. With a difficult military situation in Tianjin and a total breakdown of communications between Tianjin and Beijing, the allied nations took steps to reinforce their military presence significantly. On 17 June, Allied forces under Russian Admiral Yevgeni Alekseyev took the Dagu Forts commanding the approaches to Tianjin, and from there brought increasing numbers of troops on shore. When Cixi received an ultimatum that same day demanding that China surrender total control over all its military and financial affairs to foreigners, she defiantly stated before the entire Grand Council, "Now they [the Powers] have started the aggression, and the extinction of our nation is imminent. If we just fold our arms and yield to them, I would have no face to see our ancestors after death. If we must perish, why don't we fight to the death?" It was at this point that Cixi began to blockade the legations with the armies of the Peking Field Force, which began the siege. Cixi stated that "I have always been of the opinion, that the allied armies had been permitted to escape too easily in 1860. Only a united effort was then necessary to have given China the victory. Today, at last, the opportunity for revenge has come", and said that millions of Chinese would join the cause of fighting the foreigners since the Manchus had provided "great benefits" on China. On receipt of the news of the attack on the Dagu Forts on 19 June, Empress Dowager Cixi immediately sent an order to the legations that the diplomats and other foreigners depart Beijing under escort of the Chinese army within 24 hours.

The next morning, diplomats from the besieged legations met to discuss the Empress's offer. The majority quickly agreed that they could not trust the Chinese army. Fearing that they would be killed, they agreed to refuse the Empress's demand. The German Imperial Envoy, Baron Clemens von Ketteler, was infuriated with the actions of the Chinese army troops and determined to take his complaints to the royal court. Against the advice of the fellow foreigners, the baron left the legations with a single aide and a team of porters to carry his sedan chair. On his way to the palace, von Ketteler was killed on the streets of Beijing by a Manchu captain. His aide managed to escape the attack and carried word of the baron's death back to the diplomatic compound. At this news, the other diplomats feared they also would be murdered if they left the legation quarter and they chose to continue to defy the Chinese order to depart Beijing. The legations were hurriedly fortified. Most of the foreign civilians, which included a large number of missionaries and businessmen, took refuge in the British legation, the largest of the diplomatic compounds. Chinese Christians were primarily housed in the adjacent palace (Fu) of Prince Su, who was forced to abandon his property by the foreign soldiers.

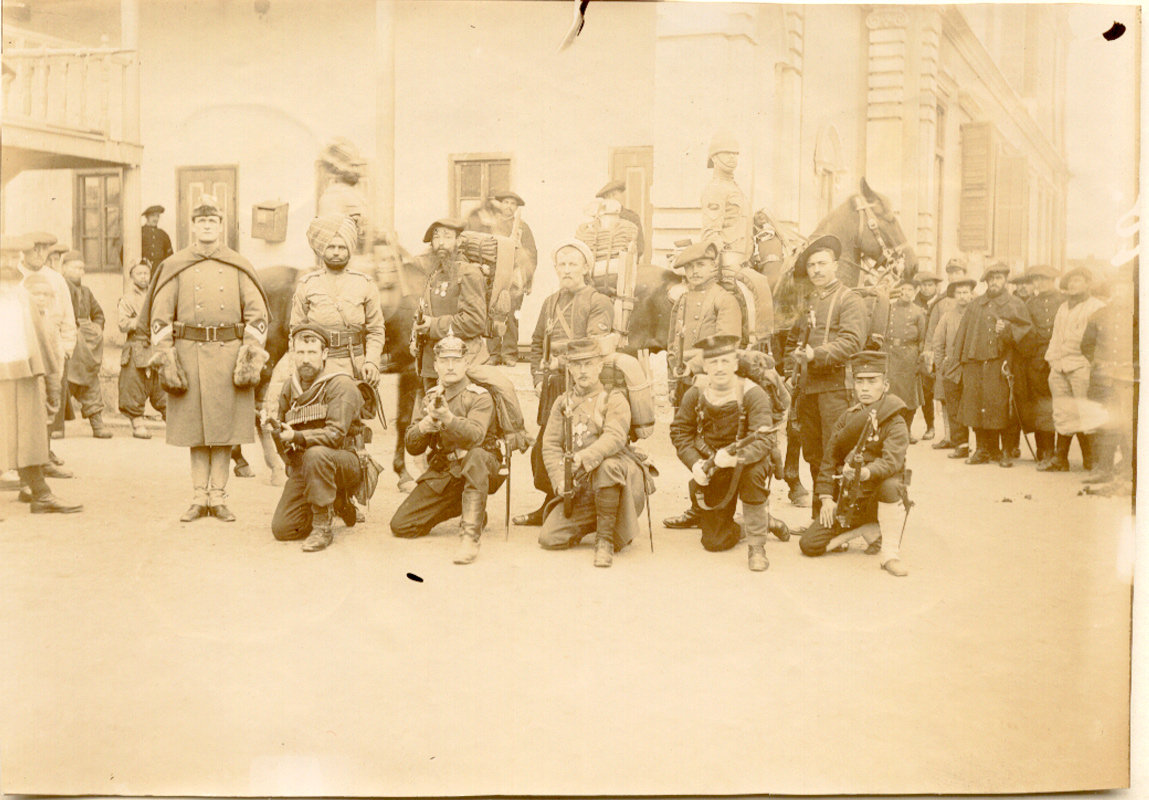
Representative Allied army and naval personnel

On 21 June, Cixi issued an imperial decree stating that hostilities had begun and ordering the regular Chinese army to join the Boxers in their attacks on the invading troops. This was a de facto declaration of war, but the Allies also made no formal declaration of war. Regional governors in the south, who commanded substantial modernised armies, such as Li Hongzhang at Guangzhou, Yuan Shikai in Shandong, Zhang Zhidong at Wuhan, and Liu Kunyi at Nanjing, formed the Mutual Defense Pact of the Southeastern Provinces. They refused to recognise the imperial court's declaration of war, which they declared a luan-ming (illegitimate order) and withheld knowledge of it from the public in the south. Yuan Shikai used his own forces to suppress Boxers in Shandong, and Zhang entered into negotiations with the foreigners in Shanghai to keep his army out of the conflict. The neutrality of these provincial and regional governors left the majority of Chinese military forces out of the conflict. The republican revolutionary Sun Yat-sen even took the opportunity to submit a proposal to Li Hongzhang to declare an independent democratic republic, although nothing came of the suggestion.

The legations of the United Kingdom, France, Germany, Italy, Austria-Hungary, Spain, Belgium, the Netherlands, the United States, Russia and Japan were located in the Beijing Legation Quarter south of the Forbidden City. The Chinese army and Boxer irregulars besieged the Legation Quarter from 20 June to 14 August 1900. A total of 473 foreign civilians, 409 soldiers, marines and sailors from eight countries, and about 3,000 Chinese Christians took refuge there. Under the command of the British minister to China, Claude Maxwell MacDonald, the legation staff and military guards defended the compound with small arms, three machine guns, and one old muzzle-loaded cannon, which was nicknamed the International Gun because the barrel was British, the carriage Italian, the shells Russian and the crew American. Chinese Christians in the legations led the foreigners to the cannon and it proved important in the defence. Also under siege in Beijing was the Northern Cathedral (Beitang) of the Catholic Church. The cathedral was defended by 43 French and Italian soldiers, 33 Catholic foreign priests and nuns, and about 3,200 Chinese Catholics. The defenders suffered heavy casualties from lack of food and from mines which the Chinese exploded in tunnels dug beneath the compound. The number of Chinese soldiers and Boxers besieging the Legation Quarter and the Beitang is unknown. Zaiyi's bannermen in the Tiger and Divine Corps led attacks against the Catholic cathedral church.

On 22 and 23 June, Chinese soldiers and Boxers set fire to areas north and west of the British Legation, using it as a "frightening tactic" to attack the defenders. The nearby Hanlin Academy, a complex of courtyards and buildings that housed "the quintessence of Chinese scholarship ... the oldest and richest library in the world", caught fire. Each side blamed the other for the destruction of the invaluable books it contained.

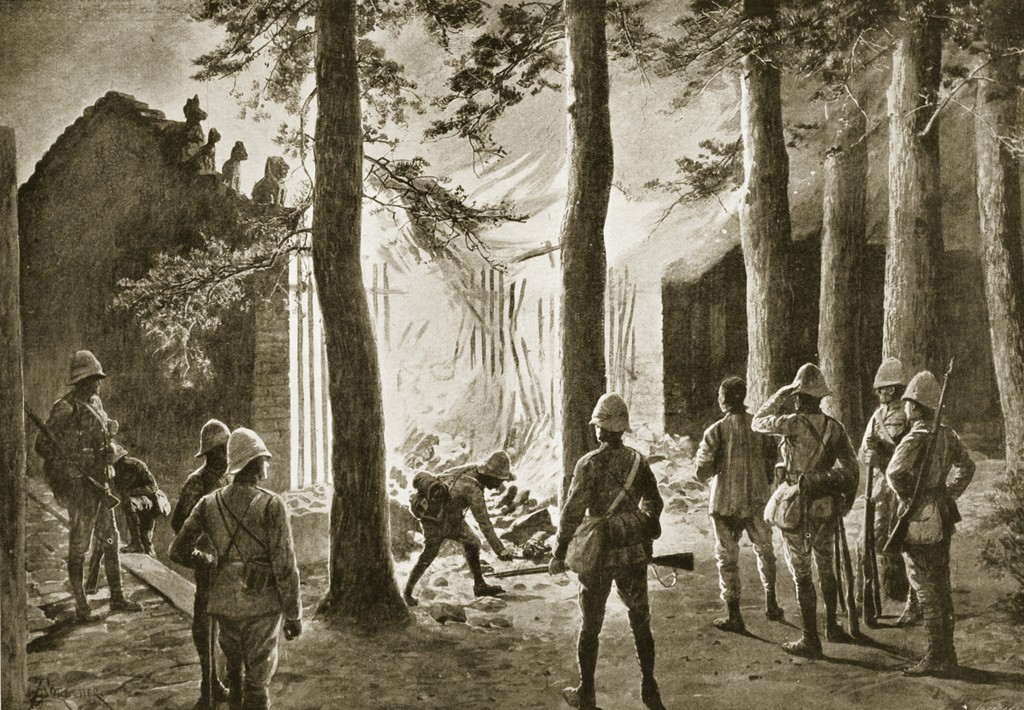
1900, soldiers burned down the Temple, Shanhai Pass – The destruction of a Chinese temple on the bank of the Pei-Ho, by Amédée Forestier

After the failure to burn out the foreigners, the Chinese army adopted an anaconda-like strategy. The Chinese built barricades surrounding the Legation Quarter and advanced, brick by brick, on the foreign lines, forcing the foreign legation guards to retreat a few feet at a time. This tactic was especially used in the Fu, defended by Japanese and Italian sailors and soldiers, and inhabited by most of the Chinese Christians. Fusillades of bullets, artillery and firecrackers were directed against the Legations almost every night—but did little damage. Sniper fire took its toll among the foreign defenders. Despite their numerical advantage, the Chinese did not attempt a direct assault on the Legation Quarter although in the words of one of the besieged, "it would have been easy by a strong, swift movement on the part of the numerous Chinese troops to have annihilated the whole body of foreigners ... in an hour". American missionary Francis Dunlap Gamewell and his crew of "fighting parsons" fortified the Legation Quarter, but impressed Chinese Christians to do most of the physical labour of building defences.

The Germans and the Americans occupied perhaps the most crucial of all defensive positions: the Tartar Wall. Holding the top of the 45 ft (14 m) tall and 40 ft (12 m) wide wall was vital. The German barricades faced east on top of the wall and 400 yd (370 m) west were the west-facing American positions. The Chinese advanced toward both positions by building barricades even closer. "The men all feel they are in a trap", said the US commander Capt. John Twiggs Myers, "and simply await the hour of execution". On 30 June, the Chinese forced the Germans off the Wall, leaving the American Marines alone in its defence. In June 1900, one American described the scene of 20,000 Boxers storming the walls:

Their yells were deafening, while the roar of gongs, drums, and horns sounded like thunder ... They waved their swords and stamped on the ground with their feet. They wore red turbans, sashes, and garters over blue cloth ... They were now only twenty yards from our gate. Three or four volleys from the Lebel rifles of our marines left more than fifty dead on the ground.

At the same time, a Chinese barricade was advanced to within a few feet of the American positions, and it became clear that the Americans had to abandon the wall or force the Chinese to retreat. At 2 am on 3 July 56 British, Russian and American marines and sailors, under the command of Myers, launched an assault against the Chinese barricade on the wall. The attack caught the Chinese sleeping, killed about 20 of them, and expelled the rest of them from the barricades. The Chinese did not attempt to advance their positions on the Tartar Wall for the remainder of the siege.

Sir Claude MacDonald said 13 July was the "most harassing day" of the siege. The Japanese and Italians in the Fu were driven back to their last defence line. The Chinese detonated a mine beneath the French Legation pushing the French and Austrians out of most of the French Legation. On 16 July, the most capable British officer was killed and the journalist George Ernest Morrison was wounded. American Minister Edwin H. Conger established contact with the Chinese government and on 17 July, and an armistice was declared by the Chinese.

=== Infighting among officials and commanders ===
General Ronglu concluded that it was futile to fight all of the powers simultaneously and declined to press home the siege. Zaiyi wanted artillery for Dong's troops to destroy the legations. Ronglu blocked the transfer of artillery to Zaiyi and Dong, preventing them from attacking. Ronglu forced Dong Fuxiang and his troops to pull back from completing the siege and destroying the legations, thereby saving the foreigners and making diplomatic concessions. Ronglu and Prince Qing sent food to the legations and used their bannermen to attack the Gansu Braves of Dong Fuxiang and the Boxers who were besieging the foreigners. They issued edicts ordering the foreigners to be protected, but the Gansu warriors ignored it, and fought against bannermen who tried to force them away from the legations. The Boxers also took commands from Dong Fuxiang. Ronglu also deliberately hid an Imperial Decree from Nie Shicheng. The Decree ordered him to stop fighting the Boxers because of the foreign invasion, and also because the population was suffering. Due to Ronglu's actions, Nie continued to fight the Boxers and killed many of them even as the foreign troops were making their way into China. Ronglu also ordered Nie to protect foreigners and save the railway from the Boxers. Because parts of the railway were saved under Ronglu's orders, the foreign invasion army was able to transport itself into China quickly. Nie committed thousands of troops against the Boxers instead of against the foreigners, but was already outnumbered by the Allies by 4,000 men. He was blamed for attacking the Boxers, and decided to sacrifice his life at Tietsin by walking into the range of Allied guns.

Xu Jingcheng, who had served as the envoy to many of the same states under siege in the Legation Quarter, argued that "the evasion of extraterritorial rights and the killing of foreign diplomats are unprecedented in China and abroad". Xu and five other officials urged Empress Dowager Cixi to order the repression of Boxers, the execution of their leaders, and a diplomatic settlement with foreign armies. The Empress Dowager was outraged, and sentenced Xu and the five others to death for "willfully and absurdly petitioning the imperial court" and "building subversive thought". They were executed on 28 July 1900 and their severed heads placed on display at Caishikou Execution Grounds in Beijing.

Reflecting this vacillation, some Chinese soldiers were quite liberally firing at foreigners under siege from its very onset. Cixi did not personally order imperial troops to conduct a siege, and on the contrary had ordered them to protect the foreigners in the legations. Prince Duan led the Boxers to loot his enemies within the imperial court and the foreigners, although imperial authorities expelled Boxers after they were let into the city and went on a looting rampage against both the foreign and the Qing imperial forces. Older Boxers were sent outside Beijing to halt the approaching foreign armies, while younger men were absorbed into the Muslim Gansu army.

With conflicting allegiances and priorities motivating the various forces inside Beijing, the situation in the city became increasingly confused. The foreign legations continued to be surrounded by both Qing imperial and Gansu forces. While Dong's Gansu army, now swollen by the addition of the Boxers, wished to press the siege, Ronglu's imperial forces seem to have largely attempted to follow Cixi's decree and protect the legations. However, to satisfy the conservatives in the imperial court, Ronglu's men also fired on the legations and let off firecrackers to give the impression that they, too, were attacking the foreigners. Inside the legations and out of communication with the outside world, the foreigners simply fired on any targets that presented themselves, including messengers from the imperial court, civilians and besiegers of all persuasions. Dong Fuxiang was denied artillery held by Ronglu which stopped him from levelling the legations, and when he complained to Empress Dowager Cixi on 23 June, she dismissively said that "Your tail is becoming too heavy to wag." The Alliance discovered large amounts of unused Chinese Krupp guns and shells after the siege was lifted.

=== Gaselee Expedition ===
Foreign navies started building up their presence along the northern China coast from the end of April 1900. Several international forces were sent to the capital, with varying success, and the Chinese forces were ultimately defeated by the Alliance. Independently, the Netherlands dispatched three cruisers in July to protect its citizens in Shanghai.

British Lieutenant-General Alfred Gaselee acted as the commanding officer of the Eight-Nation Alliance, which eventually numbered 55,000. Japanese forces, led by Fukushima Yasumasa and Yamaguchi Motomi and numbering over 20,840 men, made up the majority of the expeditionary force. French forces in the campaign, led by general Henri-Nicolas Frey, consisted mostly of inexperienced Vietnamese and Cambodian conscripts from French Indochina. The "First Chinese Regiment" (Weihaiwei Regiment) which was praised for its performance, consisted of Chinese collaborators serving in the British military. Notable events included the seizure of the Dagu Forts commanding the approaches to Tianjin and the boarding and capture of four Chinese destroyers by British Commander Roger Keyes. Among the foreigners besieged in Tianjin was a young American mining engineer named Herbert Hoover, who would go on to become the 31st President of the United States.

The international force captured Tianjin on 14 July. The international force suffered its heaviest casualties of the Boxer Rebellion in the Battle of Tientsin. With Tianjin as a base, the international force marched from Tianjin to Beijing (about 120 km (75 mi)), with 20,000 allied troops. On 4 August, there were approximately 70,000 Qing imperial troops and anywhere from 50,000 to 100,000 Boxers along the way. The allies only encountered minor resistance, fighting battles at Beicang and Yangcun. At Yangcun, Russian general Nikolai Linevich led the 14th Infantry Regiment of the US and British troops in the assault. The weather was a major obstacle. Conditions were extremely humid with temperatures sometimes reaching 42 °C (108 °F). These high temperatures and insects plagued the Allies. Soldiers became dehydrated and horses died. Chinese villagers killed Allied troops who searched for wells.

The heat killed Allied soldiers, who foamed at the mouth. The tactics along the way were gruesome on either side. Allied soldiers beheaded already dead Chinese corpses, bayoneted or beheaded live Chinese civilians, and raped Chinese girls and women. Cossacks were reported to have killed Chinese civilians almost automatically and Japanese kicked a Chinese soldier to death. The Chinese responded to the Alliance's atrocities with similar acts of violence and cruelty, especially towards captured Russians. Lieutenant Smedley Butler saw the remains of two Japanese soldiers nailed to a wall, who had their tongues cut off and their eyes gouged. Lieutenant Butler was wounded during the expedition in the leg and chest, later receiving the Brevet Medal in recognition for his actions.

The international force reached Beijing on 14 August. Following Beiyang army's defeat in the First Sino-Japanese War, the Chinese government had invested heavily in modernising the imperial army, which was equipped with modern Mauser repeater rifles and Krupp artillery. Three modernised divisions consisting of Manchu bannermen protected the Beijing Metropolitan region. Two of them were under the command of the anti-Boxer Prince Qing and Ronglu, while the anti-foreign Prince Duan commanded the ten-thousand-strong Hushenying, or "Tiger Spirit Division", which had joined the Gansu Braves and Boxers in attacking the foreigners. It was a Hushenying captain who had assassinated the German diplomat, Ketteler. The Tenacious Army under Nie Shicheng received Western style training under German and Russian officers in addition to their modernised weapons and uniforms. They effectively resisted the Alliance at the Battle of Tientsin before retreating and astounded the Alliance forces with the accuracy of their artillery during the siege of the Tianjin concessions (the artillery shells failed to explode upon impact due to corrupt manufacturing). The Gansu Braves under Dong Fuxiang, which some sources described as "ill disciplined", were armed with modern weapons but were not trained according to Western drill and wore traditional Chinese uniforms. They led the defeat of the Alliance at Langfang in the Seymour Expedition and were the most ferocious in besieging the Legations in Beijing. The British won the race among the international forces to be the first to reach the besieged Legation Quarter. The US was able to play a role due to the presence of US ships and troops stationed in Manila since the US conquest of the Philippines during the Spanish–American War and the subsequent Philippine–American War. The US military refers to this as the China Relief Expedition. United States Marines scaling the walls of Beijing is an iconic image of the Boxer Rebellion.

The British Army reached the legation quarter on the afternoon of 14 August and relieved the Legation Quarter. The Beitang was relieved on 16 August, first by Japanese soldiers and then, officially, by the French.

=== Qing court flight to Xi'an ===
As the foreign armies reached Beijing, the Qing court fled to Xi'an, with Cixi disguised as a Buddhist nun. The journey was made all the more arduous by the lack of preparation, but the Empress Dowager insisted this was not a retreat, rather a "tour of inspection". After weeks of travel, the party arrived in Xi'an, beyond protective mountain passes where the foreigners could not reach, deep in Chinese Muslim territory and protected by the Gansu Braves. The foreigners had no orders to pursue Cixi, so they decided to stay put.

== Russian invasion of Manchuria ==
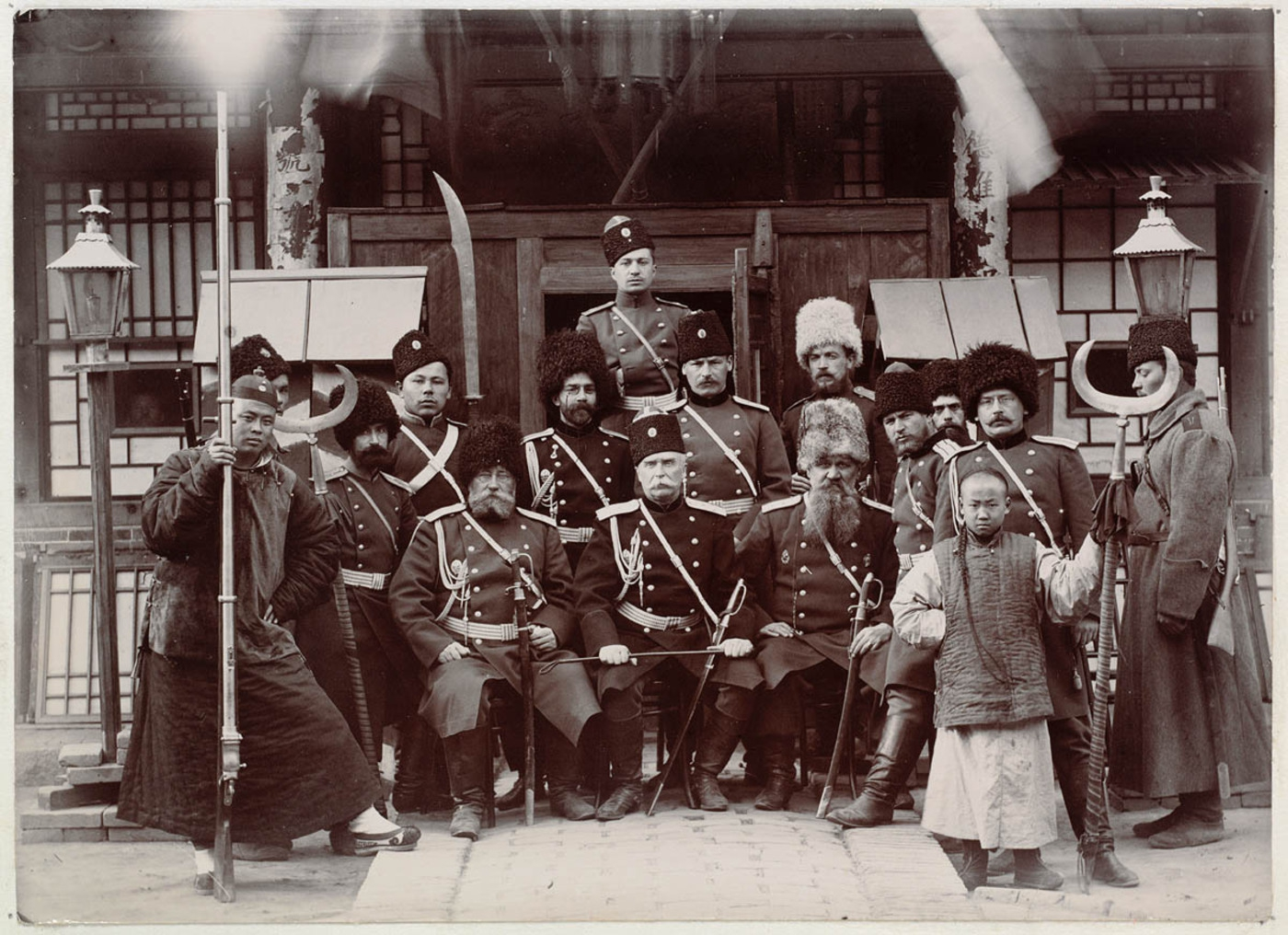
Russian officers in Manchuria

The Russian Empire and the Qing dynasty had maintained a long peace, starting with the Treaty of Nerchinsk in 1689, but Russian forces took advantage of Chinese defeats to impose the Aigun Treaty of 1858 and the Treaty of Peking of 1860 which ceded formerly Chinese territory in Manchuria to Russia, much of which is held by Russia to the present day (Primorye). The Russians aimed for control over the Amur River for navigation, and the all-weather ports of Dairen and Port Arthur in the Liaodong peninsula. The rise of Japan as an Asian power provoked Russia's anxiety, especially in light of expanding Japanese influence in Korea. Following Japan's victory in the First Sino-Japanese War of 1895, the Triple Intervention of Russia, Germany and France forced Japan to return the territory won in Liaodong, leading to a de facto Sino-Russian alliance.

Local Chinese in Manchuria were incensed at these Russian advances and began to harass Russians and Russian institutions, such as the Chinese Eastern Railway, which was guarded by Russian troops under Pavel Mishchenko. In June 1900, the Chinese bombarded the town of Blagoveshchensk on the Russian side of the Amur. The Russian government, at the insistence of war minister Aleksey Kuropatkin, used the pretext of Boxer activity to move some 200,000 troops led by Paul von Rennenkampf into the area to crush the Boxers. The Chinese used arson to destroy a bridge carrying a railway and a barracks on 27 July. The Boxers attacked the Chinese Eastern Railway and burned the Yantai mines.

== Massacre of missionaries and Chinese Christians ==
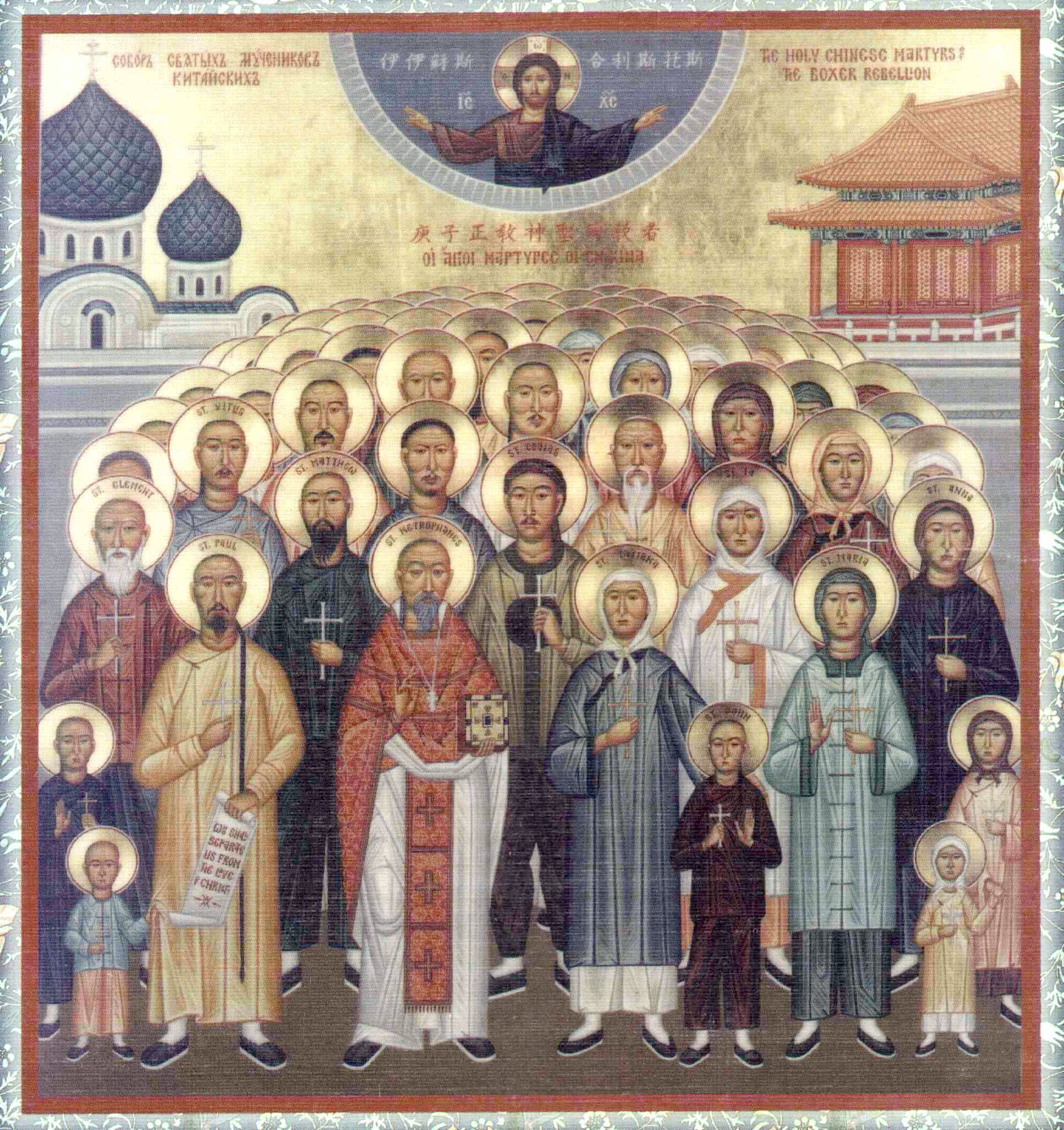
Chinese martyrs of the Eastern Orthodox Church as depicted in an icon commissioned in 1990

A total of 136 Protestant missionaries, 53 children, 47 Catholic priests and nuns, 30,000 Chinese Catholics, 2,000 Chinese Protestants, and 200–400 of the 700 Russian Orthodox Christians in Beijing are estimated to have been killed during the uprising. The Protestant dead were collectively termed the China Martyrs of 1900.

Orthodox, Protestant, and Catholic missionaries and their Chinese parishioners were massacred throughout northern China, some by Boxers and others by government troops and authorities. After the declaration of war on Western powers in June 1900, Yuxian, who had been named governor of Shanxi in March of that year, implemented a brutal anti-foreign and anti-Christian policy. On 9 July, reports circulated that he had executed forty-four foreigners (including women and children) from missionary families whom he had invited to the provincial capital Taiyuan under the promise to protect them. Although the purported eyewitness accounts have recently been questioned as improbable, this event became a notorious symbol of Chinese anger, known as the Taiyuan massacre.

The England-based Baptist Missionary Society opened its mission in Shanxi in 1877. In 1900, all its missionaries there were killed, along with all 120 converts. By the summer's end, more foreigners and as many as 2,000 Chinese Christians had been put to death in the province. Journalist and historical writer Nat Brandt has called the massacre of Christians in Shanxi "the greatest single tragedy in the history of Christian evangelicalism".

Some 222 Russian–Chinese martyrs, including Chi Sung as St. Metrophanes, were locally canonised as New Martyrs on 22 April 1902, after Archimandrite Innocent (Fugurovsky), head of the Russian Orthodox Mission in China, solicited the Most Holy Synod to perpetuate their memory. This was the first local canonisation for more than two centuries.

== Aftermath ==
=== Allied occupation and atrocities ===
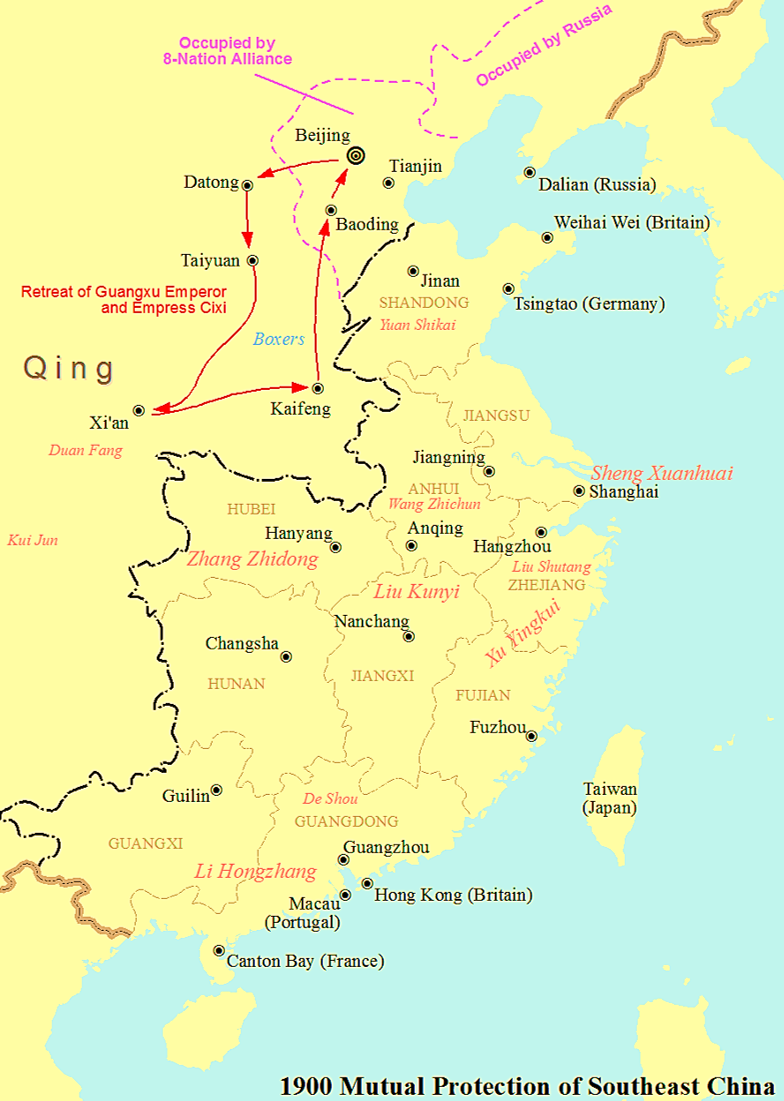
The Russian Empire occupied Manchuria while the Eight Nation Alliance jointly occupied Zhili province. The rest of China outside of Manchuria and Zhili were unaffected due to the governor generals who participated in the Mutual Protection of Southeast China in 1900.

The Eight Nation Alliance occupied Zhili province while Russia occupied Manchuria, but the rest of China was not occupied due to the actions of several Han governors who formed the Mutual Protection of Southeast China that refused to obey the declaration of war and kept their armies and provinces out of the war. Zhang Zhidong told Everard Fraser, the Hankou-based British consul general, that he despised Manchus so that the Eight Nation Alliance would not occupy provinces under the Mutual Defense Pact.

Beijing, Tianjin and Zhili province were occupied for more than one year by the international expeditionary force under the command of German Field Marshal Alfred von Waldersee, who had initially been appointed commander of the Eight-Nation Alliance during the rebellion but did not arrive in China until after most of the fighting had ended. The Americans and British paid General Yuan Shikai and his army (the Right Division) to help the Eight Nation Alliance suppress the Boxers. Yuan Shikai's forces killed tens of thousands of people in their anti-Boxer campaign in Zhili province and Shandong after the Alliance captured Beijing. The majority of the hundreds of thousands of people living in inner Beijing during the Qing were Manchus and Mongol bannermen from the Eight Banners after they were moved there in 1644, when Han Chinese were expelled. Sawara Tokusuke, a Japanese journalist, wrote in "Miscellaneous Notes about the Boxers" about the rapes of Manchu and Mongol banner girls. He alleged that soldiers of the Eight-Nation Alliance raped a large number of women in Peking, including all seven daughters of Viceroy Yulu of the Hitara clan. Likewise, a daughter and a wife of Mongol banner noble Chongqi of the Alute clan were allegedly gang-raped by soldiers of the Eight-Nation Alliance. Chongqi killed himself on 26 August 1900, and some other relatives, including his son, Baochu, did likewise shortly afterward.

During attacks on suspected Boxer areas from September 1900 to March 1901, European and American forces engaged in tactics which included public decapitations of Chinese with suspected Boxer sympathies, systematic looting, routine shooting of farm animals and crop destruction, destruction of religious buildings and public buildings, burning of religious texts, and widespread rape of Chinese women and girls.

Contemporary British and American observers levelled their greatest criticism at German, Russian, and Japanese troops for their ruthlessness and willingness to execute Chinese of all ages and backgrounds, sometimes burning villages and killing their entire populations. The German force arrived too late to take part in the fighting but undertook punitive expeditions to villages in the countryside. According to missionary Arthur Henderson Smith, in addition to burning and looting, Germans "cut off the heads of many Chinese within their jurisdiction, many of them for absolutely trivial offenses". US Army Lieutenant C. D. Rhodes reported that German and French soldiers set fire to buildings where innocent peasants were sheltering and would shoot and bayonet peasants who fled the burning buildings. According to Australian soldiers, Germans extorted ransom payments from villages in exchange for not torching their homes and crops. British journalist George Lynch wrote that German and Italian soldiers engaged in a practice of raping Chinese women and girls before burning their villages. According to Lynch, German soldiers would attempt to cover up these atrocities by throwing rape victims into wells as staged suicides. Lynch said, "There are things that I must not write, and that may not be printed in England, which would seem to show that this Western civilisation of ours is merely a veneer over savagery".

On 27 July, during departure ceremonies for the German relief force, Kaiser Wilhelm II included an impromptu but intemperate reference to the Hun invaders of continental Europe:

Should you encounter the enemy, he will be defeated! No quarter will be given! Prisoners will not be taken! Whoever falls into your hands is forfeited. Just as a thousand years ago the Huns under their King Attila made a name for themselves, one that even today makes them seem mighty in history and legend, may the name German be affirmed by you in such a way in China that no Chinese will ever again dare to look cross-eyed at a German.

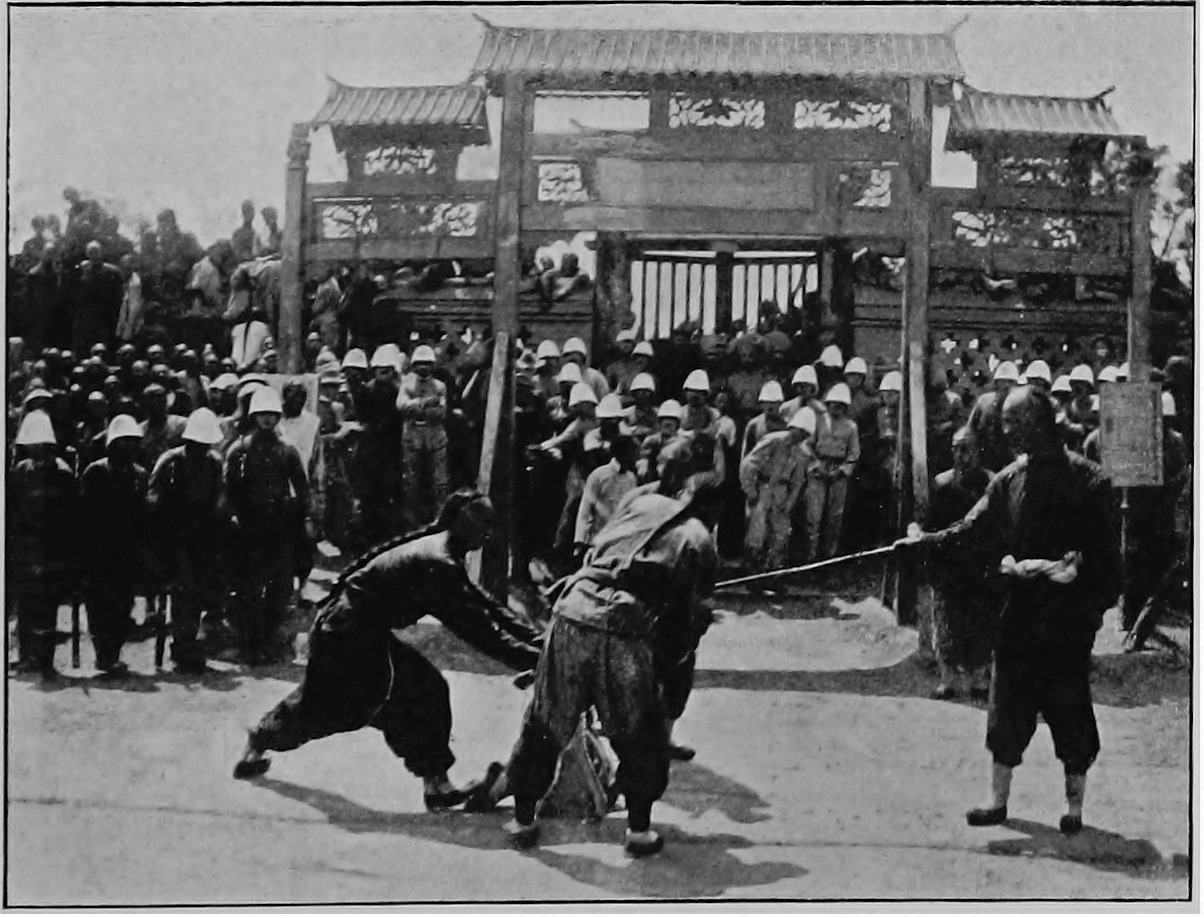
French troops observe the execution of a Boxer

One newspaper called the aftermath of the siege a "carnival of ancient loot", and others called it "an orgy of looting" by soldiers, civilians and missionaries. These characterisations called to mind the sacking of the Summer Palace in 1860. Each nationality accused the others of being the worst looters. An American diplomat, Herbert G. Squiers, filled several railway carriages with loot and artefacts. The British Legation held loot auctions every afternoon and proclaimed, "Looting on the part of British troops was carried out in the most orderly manner." However, one British officer noted, "It is one of the unwritten laws of war that a city which does not surrender at the last and is taken by storm is looted." For the rest of 1900 and 1901, the British held loot auctions every day except Sunday in front of the main-gate to the British Legation. Many foreigners, including Claude Maxwell MacDonald and Lady Ethel MacDonald and George Ernest Morrison of The Times, were active bidders among the crowd. Many of these looted items ended up in Europe. The Catholic Beitang or North Cathedral was a "salesroom for stolen property". The American general Adna Chaffee banned looting by American soldiers, but the ban was ineffectual. According to Chaffee, "it is safe to say that where one real Boxer has been killed, fifty harmless coolies or laborers, including not a few women and children, have been slain".

A few Western missionaries took an active part in calling for retribution. To provide restitution to missionaries and Chinese Christian families whose property had been destroyed, William Scott Ament, a missionary of American Board of Commissioners for Foreign Missions, guided American troops through villages to punish those he suspected of being Boxers and confiscate their property. When Mark Twain read of this expedition, he wrote a scathing essay, "To the Person Sitting in Darkness", that attacked the "Reverend bandits of the American Board", especially targeting Ament, one of the most respected missionaries in China. The controversy was front-page news during much of 1901. Ament's counterpart on the distaff side was British missionary Georgina Smith, who presided over a neighbourhood in Beijing as judge and jury.

While one historical account reported that Japanese troops were astonished by other Alliance troops raping civilians, others noted that Japanese troops were "looting and burning without mercy", and that Chinese "women and girls by hundreds have committed suicide to escape a worse fate at the hands of Russian and Japanese brutes". Roger Keyes, who commanded the British destroyer Fame and accompanied the Gaselee Expedition, noted that the Japanese had brought their own "regimental wives" (prostitutes) to the front to keep their soldiers from raping Chinese civilians. However, in the context of revising the unequal treaties, the Japanese high command emphasized compliance with international law, and there exist contemporary foreign accounts stating that the Japanese army maintained relatively good discipline. The American missionary W. A. P. Martin and the British minister Claude MacDonald, among others, evaluated the conduct of Japanese troops as more orderly in comparison with other foreign forces.

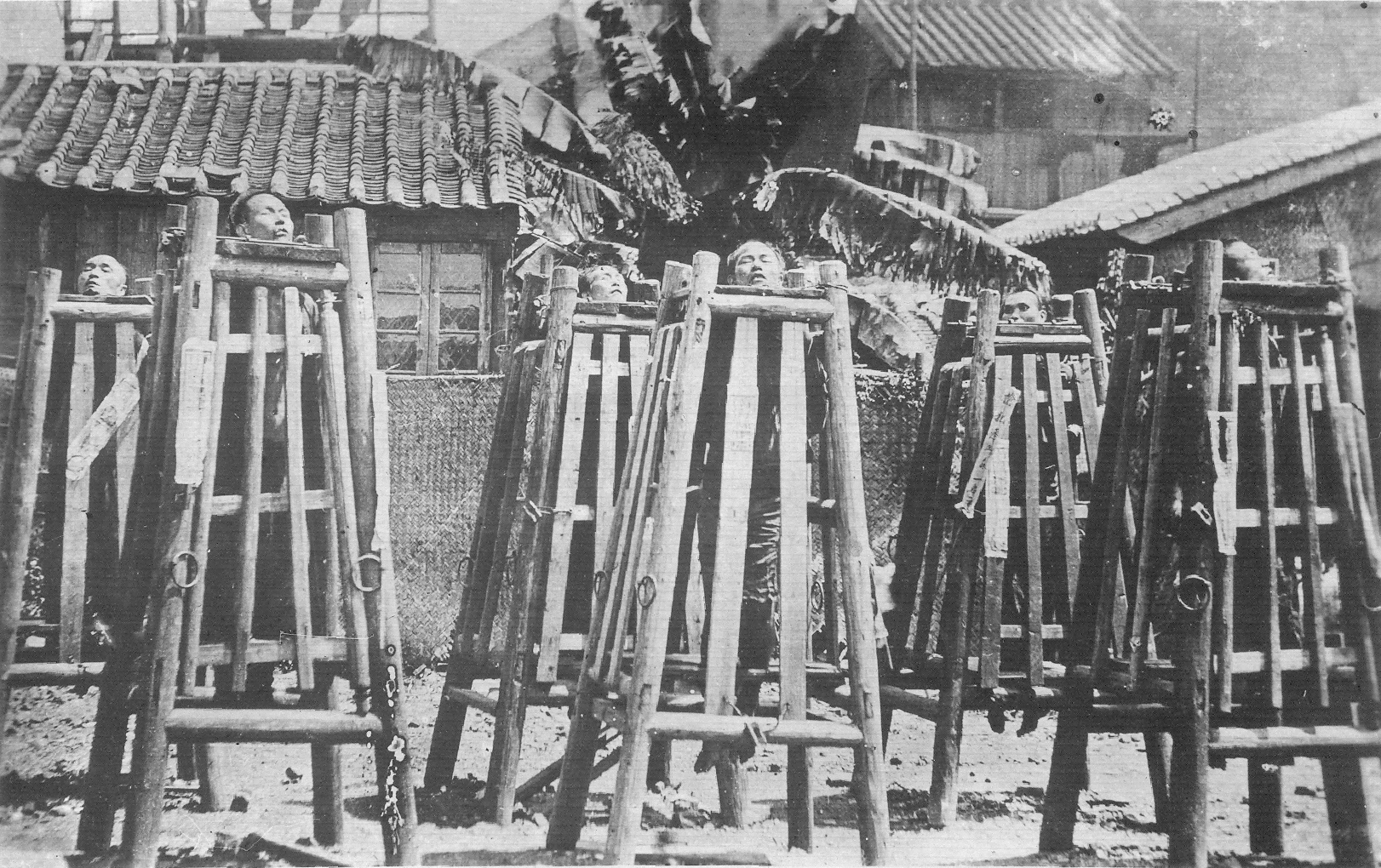
Execution of Boxers by standing strangulation

The Daily Telegraph journalist E. J. Dillon stated that he witnessed the mutilated corpses of Chinese women who were raped and killed by the Alliance troops. The French commander dismissed the rapes, attributing them to "gallantry of the French soldier". According to U.S. Captain Grote Hutcheson, French forces burned each village they encountered during a 99-mile march and planted the French flag in the ruins.

Many bannermen supported the Boxers, and shared their anti-foreign sentiment. Bannermen had been devastated in the First Sino-Japanese War in 1895 and Banner armies were destroyed while resisting the invasion. In the words of historian Pamela Crossley, their living conditions went "from desperate poverty to true misery". When thousands of Manchus fled south from Aigun during the fighting in 1900, their cattle and horses were stolen by Russian Cossacks who then burned their villages and homes to ashes. Manchu Banner armies were destroyed while resisting the invasion, many annihilated by Russians. Manchu Shoufu killed himself during the battle of Peking and the Manchu Lao She's father was killed by Western soldiers in the battle as the Manchu banner armies of the Center Division of the Guards Army, Tiger Spirit Division and Peking Field Force in the Metropolitan banners were slaughtered by the western soldiers. The Inner-city Legation Quarters and Catholic cathedral (Church of the Saviour, Beijing) were both attacked by Manchu bannermen. Manchu bannermen were slaughtered by the Eight Nation Alliance all over Manchuria and Beijing because most of the Manchu bannermen supported the Boxers.The clan system of the Manchus in Aigun was obliterated by the despoliation of the area at the hands of the Russian invaders. There were 1,266 households including 900 Daurs and 4,500 Manchus in Sixty-Four Villages East of the River and Blagoveshchensk until the Blagoveshchensk massacre and Sixty-Four Villages East of the River massacre committed by Russian Cossack soldiers. Many Manchu villages were burned by Cossacks in the massacre according to Victor Zatsepine.

Manchu royals, officials and officers like Yuxian, Qixiu, Zaixun, Prince Zhuang and Captain Enhai were executed or forced to commit suicide by the Eight Nation Alliance. Manchu official Gangyi's execution was demanded, but he had already died. Japanese soldiers arrested Qixiu before he was executed. Zaixun, Prince Zhuang was forced to commit suicide on 21 February 1901. They executed Yuxian on 22 February 1901. On 31 December 1900 German soldiers beheaded the Manchu captain Enhai for killing Clemens von Ketteler.

=== Indemnity ===
After the capture of Peking by the foreign armies, some of Cixi's advisers advocated that the war be carried on, arguing that China could have defeated the foreigners as it was disloyal and traitorous people within China who allowed Beijing and Tianjin to be captured by the Allies, and that the interior of China was impenetrable. They also recommended that Dong Fuxiang continue fighting. The Empress Dowager Cixi was practical however, and decided that the terms were generous enough for her to acquiesce when she was assured of her continued reign after the war and that China would not be forced to cede any territory.

On 7 September 1901, the Qing imperial court agreed to sign the Boxer Protocol, also known as Peace Agreement between the Eight-Nation Alliance and China. The protocol ordered the execution of 10 high-ranking officials linked to the outbreak and other officials who were found guilty for the slaughter of foreigners in China. Alfons Mumm, Ernest Satow, and Komura Jutaro signed on behalf of Germany, Britain, and Japan, respectively.

China was fined war reparations of 450,000,000 taels of fine silver (approx. 540,000,000 troy ounces (17,000 t)) for the loss that it caused. The reparation was to be paid by 1940, within 39 years, and would be 982,238,150 taels with interest (4 per cent per year) included. The existing tariff increased from 3.18 to 5 per cent, and formerly duty-free merchandise was newly taxed, to help meet these indemnity demands. The sum of reparations was estimated by the Chinese population size (roughly 450 million in 1900) at one tael per person. Chinese customs income and salt taxes guaranteed the reparation. China paid 668,661,220 taels of silver from 1901 to 1939 – equivalent in 2010 to approx. US$61 billion on a purchasing-power-parity basis.

A large portion of the reparations paid to the United States was diverted to pay for the education of Chinese students in US universities under the Boxer Indemnity Scholarship Program. To prepare the students chosen for this program, an institute was established to teach the English language and to serve as a preparatory school. When the first of these students returned to China, they undertook the teaching of subsequent students; from this institute was born Tsinghua University.

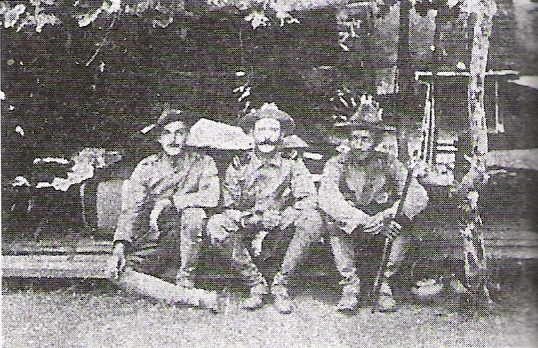
American troops during the Boxer Rebellion

The US China Inland Mission lost more members than any other missionary agency: 58 adults and 21 children were killed. However, in 1901, when the allied nations were demanding compensation from the Chinese government, Hudson Taylor refused to accept payment for loss of property or life, to demonstrate the meekness and gentleness of Christ to the Chinese.

The Belgian Catholic vicar apostolic of Ordos wanted foreign troops garrisoned in Inner Mongolia, but the Governor refused. Bermyn petitioned the Manchu Enming to send troops to Hetao where Prince Duan's Mongol troops and General Dong Fuxiang's Muslim troops allegedly threatened Catholics. It turned out that Bermyn had created the incident as a hoax. Western Catholic missionaries forced Mongols to give up their land to Han Chinese Catholics as part of the Boxer indemnities according to Mongol historian Shirnut Sodbilig. Mongols had participated in attacks against Catholic missions in the Boxer rebellion.

The Qing government did not capitulate to all the foreign demands. The Manchu governor Yuxian was executed, but the imperial court refused to execute the Han Chinese General Dong Fuxiang, although he had also encouraged the killing of foreigners during the rebellion. Empress Dowager Cixi intervened when the Alliance demanded him executed and Dong was only cashiered and sent back home. Instead, Dong lived a life of luxury and power in "exile" in his home province of Gansu. Upon Dong's death in 1908, all honours which had been stripped from him were restored and he was given a full military burial. The indemnity was never fully paid and was lifted during World War II.

== Long-term consequences ==
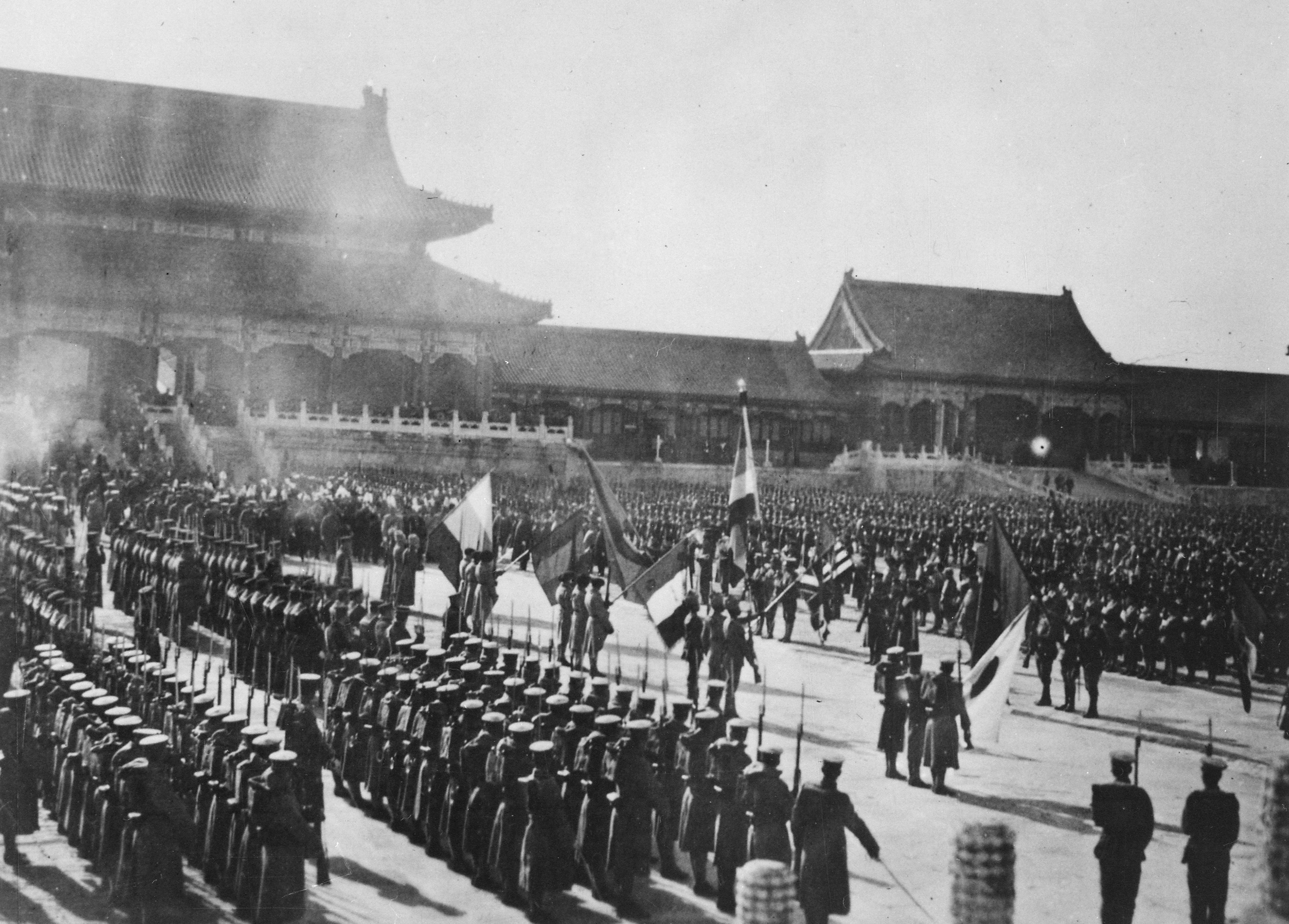
Foreign armies assemble inside the Forbidden City after capturing Beijing, 28 November 1900

The occupation of Beijing by foreign powers and the failure of the rebellion further eroded support for the Qing state. Support for reforms decreased, while support for revolution increased. In the ten years after the Boxer Rebellion, uprisings in China increased, particularly in the south. Support grew for the Tongmenghui, an alliance of anti-Qing groups which later became the Kuomintang.

Cixi was returned to Beijing, the foreign powers believing that maintaining the Qing government was the best way to control China. The Qing state made further efforts to reform. It abolished the imperial examinations in 1905 and sought to gradually introduce consultative assemblies. Along with the formation of new military and police organisations, the reforms also simplified central bureaucracy and made a start at revamping taxation policies. These efforts failed to maintain the Qing dynasty, which was overthrown in the 1911 Xinhai Revolution.

In October 1900, Russia occupied the provinces of Manchuria, a move that threatened Anglo-American hopes of maintaining the country's openness to commerce under the Open Door Policy.

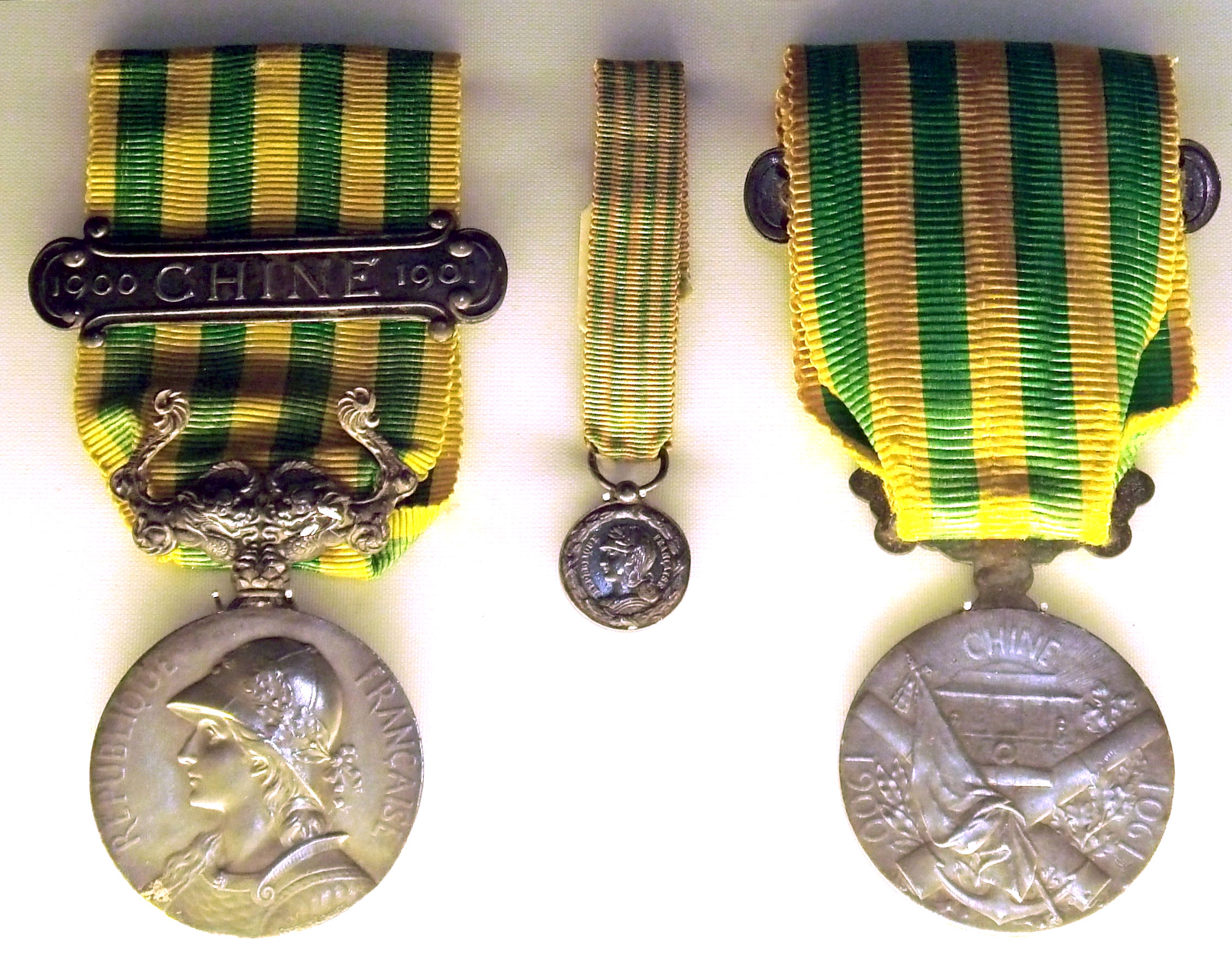
French 1901 China expedition commemorative medal. Musée de la Légion d'Honneur

The historian Walter LaFeber has argued that President William McKinley's decision to send 5,000 American troops to quell the rebellion marks "the origins of modern presidential war powers":

McKinley took a historic step in creating a new, 20th century presidential power. He dispatched the five thousand troops without consulting Congress, let alone obtaining a declaration of war, to fight the Boxers who were supported by the Chinese government ... Presidents had previously used such force against non-governmental groups that threatened U.S. interests and citizens. It was now used, however, against recognised governments, and without obeying the Constitution's provisions about who was to declare war.

Arthur M. Schlesinger Jr., concurred and wrote:

The intervention in China marked the start of a crucial shift in the presidential employment of armed force overseas. In the 19th century, military force committed without congressional authorisation had been typically used against nongovernmental organisations. Now it was beginning to be used against sovereign states, and, in the case of Theodore Roosevelt, with less consultation than ever.

== Analysis of the Boxers ==
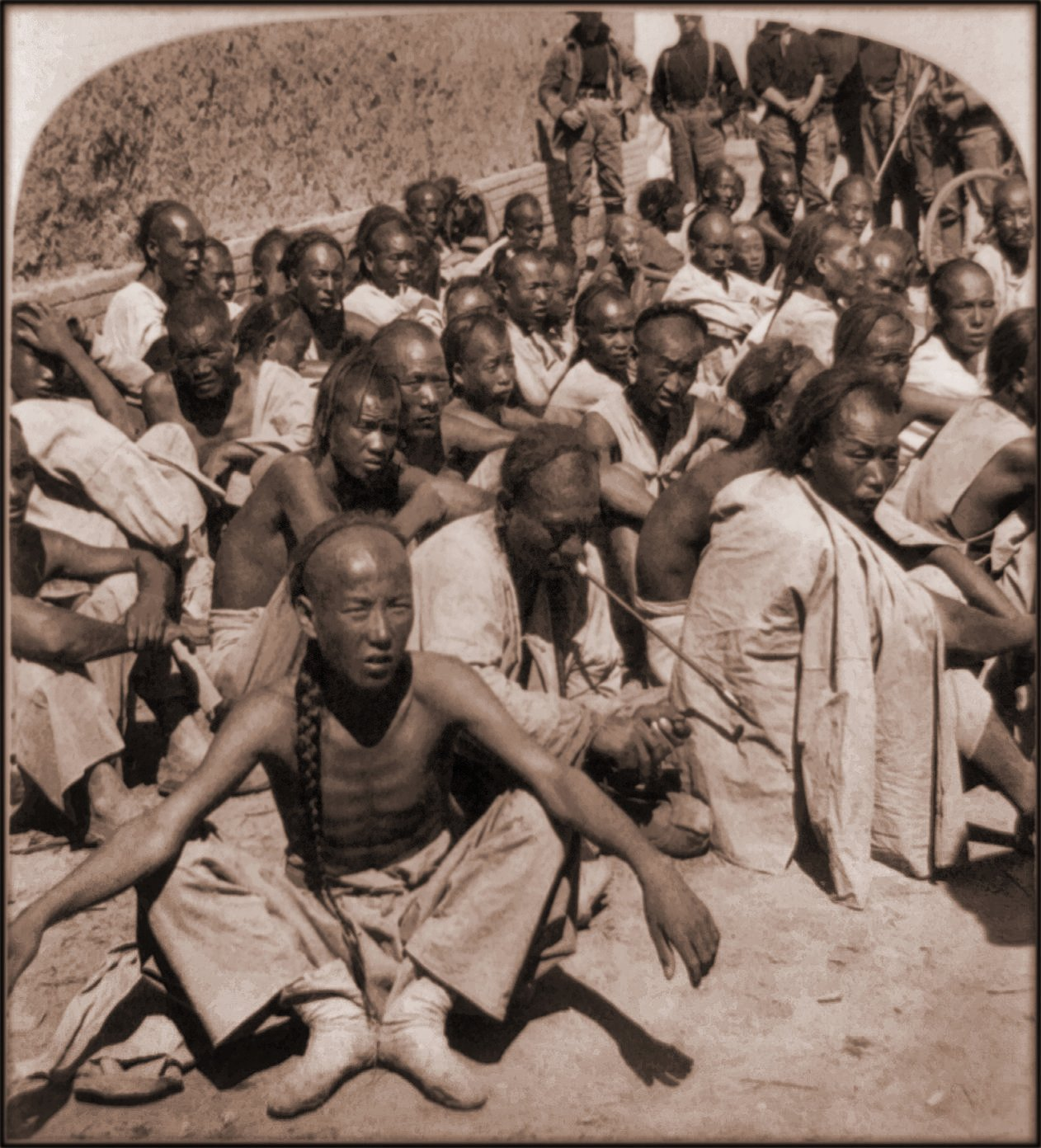
Boxers captured by the US 6th Cavalry Regiment near Tianjin in 1901

In the short-term, the Boxer Rebellion prompted many Chinese and Westerners to take a pessimistic view of Christian/non-Christian relations and Chinese/European relations. Even among Chinese who were not sympathetic to the movement, many believed that the Catholic presence and proselytizing in China had provoked the retaliation to some degree.

From the beginning, views differed as to whether the Boxers were better seen as anti-imperialist, patriotic and proto-nationalist, or as backward, irrational, and futile opponents of what was inevitable change. The historian Joseph W. Esherick comments that "confusion about the Boxer Uprising is not simply a matter of popular misconceptions" since "there is no major incident in China's modern history on which the range of professional interpretation is as great".

The Boxers drew condemnation from those who wanted to modernise China according to a Western model of civilisation. Sun Yat-sen, considered the founding father of modern China, at the time worked to overthrow the Qing but believed that government spread rumours that "caused confusion among the populace" and stirred up the Boxer Movement. He delivered "scathing criticism" of the Boxers' "anti-foreignism and obscurantism". Sun praised the Boxers for their "spirit of resistance" but called them "bandits". Students studying in Japan were ambivalent. Some stated that while the uprising originated from the ignorant and stubborn people, their beliefs were brave and righteous and could be transformed into a force for independence. Reformers like Liang Qichao criticized the Boxers as superstitious and ignorant; this remained the dominant narrative on the rebellion among Chinese intellectuals until the 1920s and 1930s.

After the fall of the Qing dynasty in 1911, nationalistic Chinese became more sympathetic to the Boxers. In 1918, Sun praised their fighting spirit and said that the Boxers were courageous and fearless in fighting to the death against the Alliance armies, specifically the Battle of Yangcun. Chinese liberals such as Hu Shih, who called on China to modernise, still condemned the Boxers for their irrationality and barbarity. The leader of the New Culture Movement, Chen Duxiu, forgave the "barbarism of the Boxer ... given the crime foreigners committed in China", and contended that it was those "subservient to the foreigners" that truly "deserved our resentment".

In other countries, views of the Boxers were complex and contentious. Mark Twain said that "the Boxer is a patriot. He loves his country better than he does the countries of other people. I wish him success." The Russian writer Leo Tolstoy also praised the Boxers and accused Nicholas II of Russia and Wilhelm II of Germany of being chiefly responsible for the lootings, rapes, murders, and "Christian brutality" of the Russian and Western troops. The Russian revolutionary Vladimir Lenin mocked the Russian government's claim that it was protecting Christian civilisation: "Poor Imperial Government! So Christianly unselfish, and yet so unjustly maligned! Several years ago it unselfishly seized Port Arthur, and now it is unselfishly seizing Manchuria; it has unselfishly flooded the frontier provinces of China with hordes of contractors, engineers, and officers, who, by their conduct, have roused to indignation even the Chinese, known for their docility." The Russian newspaper Amurskii Krai criticised the killing of innocent civilians and charged that restraint would have been more becoming of a "civilized Christian nation", asking: "What shall we tell civilized people? We shall have to say to them: 'Do not consider us as brothers anymore. We are mean and terrible people; we have killed those who hid at our place, who sought our protection.'" Lenin saw the Boxers as an avant-garde Proletarian force fighting against imperialism.

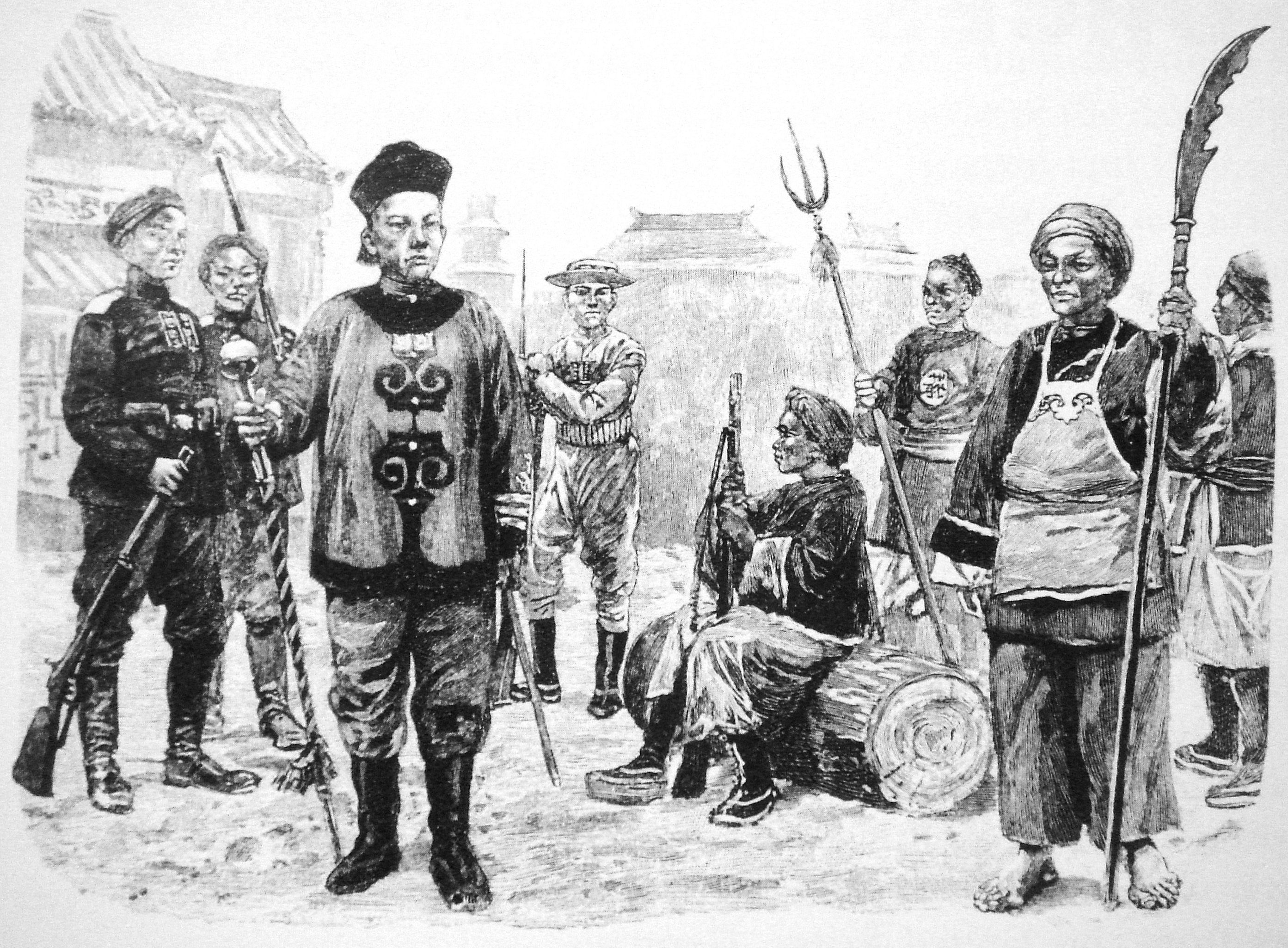
Qing forces of Chinese soldiers in 1899–1901 Left: two infantrymen of the New Imperial Army. Front: drum major of the regular army. Seated on the trunk: field artilleryman. Right: Boxers

Some American churchmen spoke out in support of the Boxers. In 1912, the evangelist George F. Pentecost said that the Boxer uprising was a:

"patriotic movement to expel the 'foreign devils' – just that – the foreign devils". "Suppose", he said, "the great nations of Europe were to put their fleets together, came over here, seize Portland, move on down to Boston, then New York, then Philadelphia, and so on down the Atlantic Coast and around the Gulf of Galveston? Suppose they took possession of these port cities, drove our people into the hinterland, built great warehouses and factories, brought in a body of dissolute agents, and calmly notified our people that henceforward they would manage the commerce of the country? Would we not have a Boxer movement to drive those foreign European Christian devils out of our country?"

The Indian Bengali Rabindranath Tagore attacked the European colonialists. A number of Indian soldiers in the British Indian Army sympathised with the cause of the Boxers, and in 1994 the Indian military returned a bell looted by British soldiers in the Temple of Heaven to China.

Some Western observers emphasized the Boxers' superstition and irrationality. Among other examples, they pointed to the fact that the drought which helped give to the movement had been compounded by false, widespread rumours that Christians were poisoning wells. Many Western accounts at the time of the rebellion used it portray a narrative of China as a superstitious land.

The events also left a longer impact. Historian Robert Bickers noted that the Boxer Rebellion served as an equivalent to the Indian Rebellion of 1857 for the British government, and agitated the Yellow Peril among the British public. He adds that later events like the Northern Expedition during the 1920s, and even the activities of the Red Guards during the 1960s, were perceived as standing in the shadow of the Boxers.

History textbooks in Taiwan and Hong Kong often present the Boxer as irrational, but the central government textbooks in mainland China have described the Boxer movement as an anti-imperialist, patriotic peasant movement that failed by the lack of leadership from the modern working class—and the international army as an invading force. In recent decades, however, large-scale projects of village interviews and explorations of archival sources have led historians in China to take a more nuanced view. Some non-Chinese scholars, such as Joseph Esherick, have seen the movement as anti-imperialist, but others hold that the concept "nationalistic" is anachronistic because the Chinese nation had not been formed, and the Boxers were more concerned with regional issues. Paul Cohen's recent study includes a survey of "the Boxers as myth", which shows how their memory was used in changing ways in 20th-century China from the New Culture Movement to the Cultural Revolution.

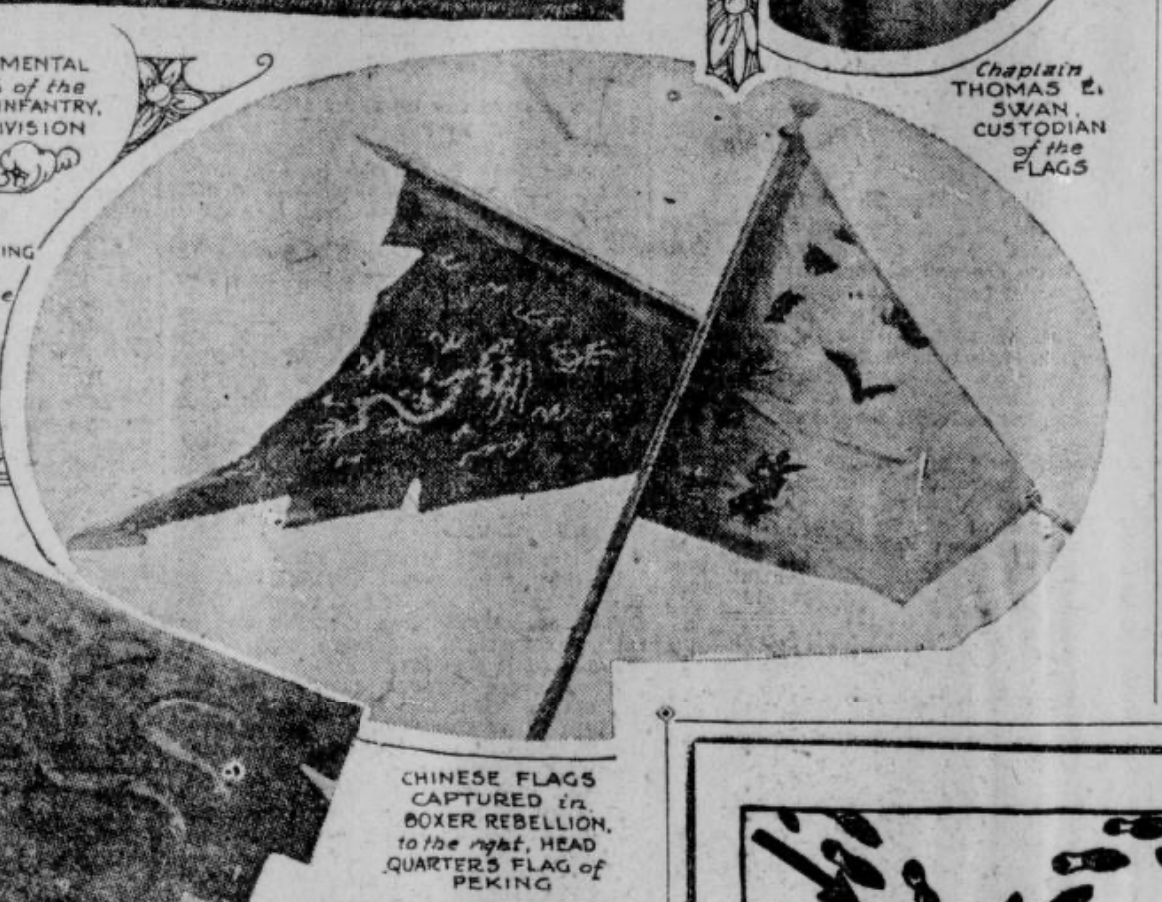
Boxers flags captured by the Americans

In recent years, the Boxer question has been debated in the People's Republic of China. In 1998, the critical scholar Wang Yi argued that the Boxers had features in common with the extremism of the Cultural Revolution. Both events had the external goal of "liquidating all harmful pests" and the domestic goal of "eliminating bad elements of all descriptions" and that the relation was rooted in "cultural obscurantism". Wang explained to his readers the changes in attitudes towards the Boxers from the condemnation of the May Fourth Movement to the approval expressed by Mao Zedong during the Cultural Revolution. In 2006, Yuan Weishi, a professor of philosophy at Zhongshan University in Guangzhou, wrote that the Boxers by their "criminal actions brought unspeakable suffering to the nation and its people! These are all facts that everybody knows, and it is a national shame that the Chinese people cannot forget." Yuan charged that history textbooks had been lacking in neutrality by presenting the Boxer Uprising as a "magnificent feat of patriotism" and not the view that most Boxer rebels were violent. In response, some labelled Yuan Weishi a "traitor" (Hanjian).

== Terminology ==
The name "Boxer Rebellion", concludes Joseph W. Esherick, a contemporary historian, is truly a "misnomer", for the Boxers "never rebelled against the Manchu rulers of China and their Qing dynasty" and the "most common Boxer slogan, throughout the history of the movement, was 'support the Qing, destroy the Foreign,' where 'foreign' clearly meant the foreign religion, Christianity, and its Chinese converts as much as the foreigners themselves". He adds that only after the movement was suppressed by the Allied Intervention did the foreign powers and influential Chinese officials both realise that the Qing would have to remain as the government of China to maintain order and collect taxes to pay the indemnity. Therefore, to save face for the Empress Dowager and the members of the imperial court, all argued that the Boxers were rebels and that the only support which the Boxers received from the imperial court came from a few Manchu princes. Esherick concludes that the origin of the term "rebellion" was "purely political and opportunistic", but it has had a remarkable staying power, particularly in popular accounts.

On 6 June 1900, The Times of London used the term "rebellion" in quotation marks, presumably to indicate its view that the rising was actually instigated by Empress Dowager Cixi. The historian Lanxin Xiang refers to the uprising as the "so called 'Boxer Rebellion'", and he also states that "while peasant rebellion was nothing new in Chinese history, a war against the world's most powerful states was." Other recent Western works refer to the uprising as the "Boxer Movement", the "Boxer War" or the Yihetuan Movement, while Chinese studies refer to it as the "Yihetuan Movement" (义和团运动). In his discussion of the general and legal implications of the terminology involved, the German scholar Thoralf Klein notes that all of the terms, including the Chinese terms, are "posthumous interpretations of the conflict". He argues that each term, whether it be "uprising", "rebellion" or "movement" implies a different definition of the conflict. Even the term "Boxer War", which has frequently been used by scholars in the West, raises questions. Neither side made a formal declaration of war. The imperial edicts on June 21 said that hostilities had begun and directed the regular Chinese army to join the Boxers against the Allied armies. This was a de facto declaration of war. The Allied troops behaved like soldiers who were mounting a punitive expedition in colonial style, rather than soldiers who were waging a declared war with legal constraints. The Allies took advantage of the fact that China had not signed "The Laws and Customs of War on Land", a key document signed at the 1899 Hague Peace Conference. They argued that China had violated provisions that they themselves ignored.

There is also a difference in terms referring to the combatants. The first reports which came from China in 1898 referred to the village activists as the "Yihequan", (Wade–Giles: I Ho Ch'uan). The earliest use of the term "Boxer" is contained in a letter which was written in Shandong in September 1899 by missionary Grace Newton. The context of the letter makes it clear that when it was written, "Boxer" was already a well-known term, probably coined by Arthur Henderson Smith or Henry Porter, two missionaries who were also residing in Shandong. Smith wrote in his 1902 book that the name:

I Ho Ch'üan ... literally denotes the "Fists" (Ch'üan) of Righteousness (or Public) (I) Harmony (Ho), in apparent allusion to the strength of the united force which was to be put forth. As the Chinese phrase "fists and feet" signifies boxing and wrestling, there appeared to be no more suitable term for the adherents of the sect than "Boxers", a designation first used by one or two missionary correspondents of foreign journals in China, and later universally accepted on account of the difficulty of coining a better one.

== Media portrayal ==
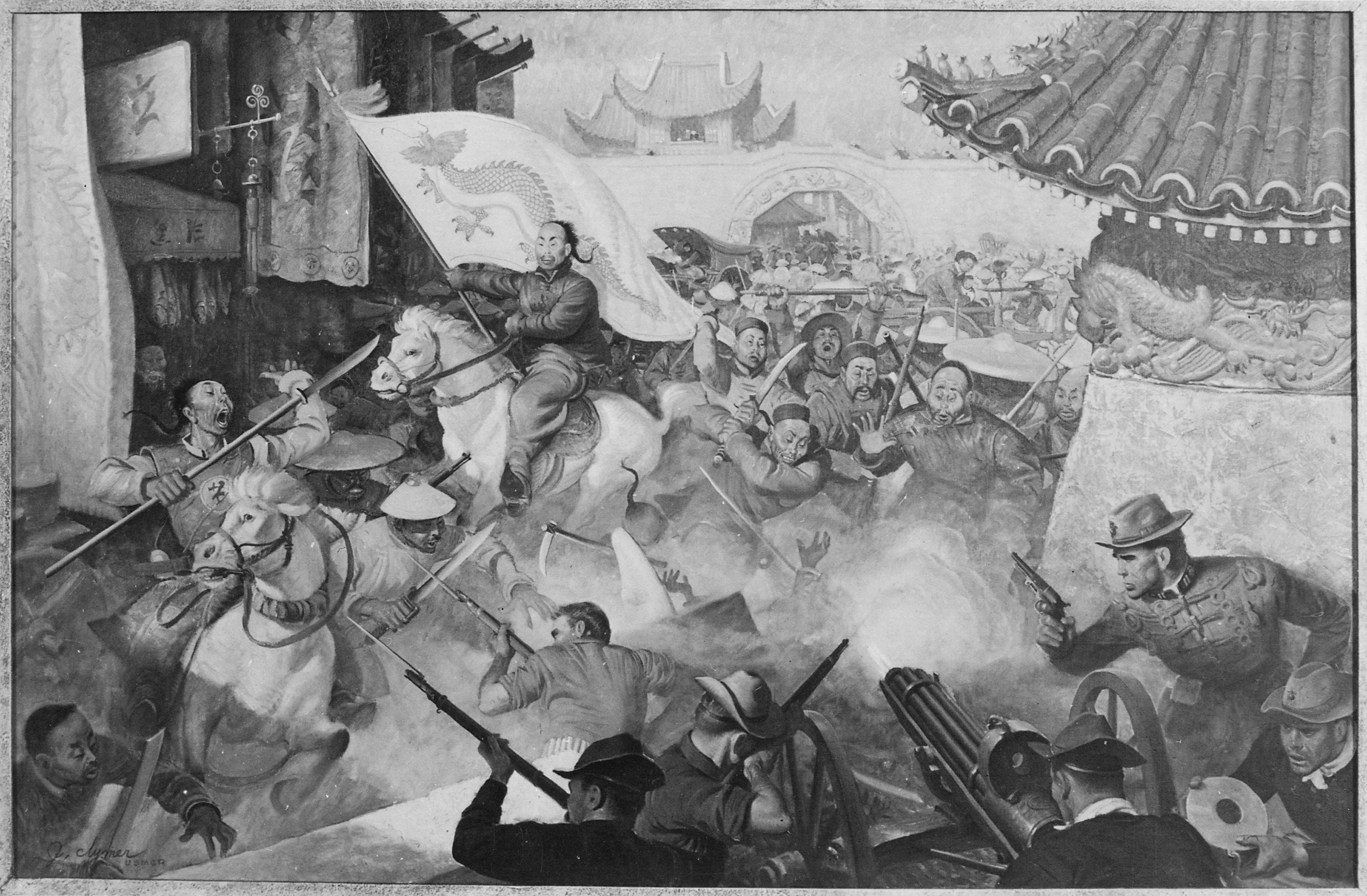
US Marines fight rebellious Boxers outside Beijing Legation Quarter, 1900 – copy of painting by Sergeant John Clymer

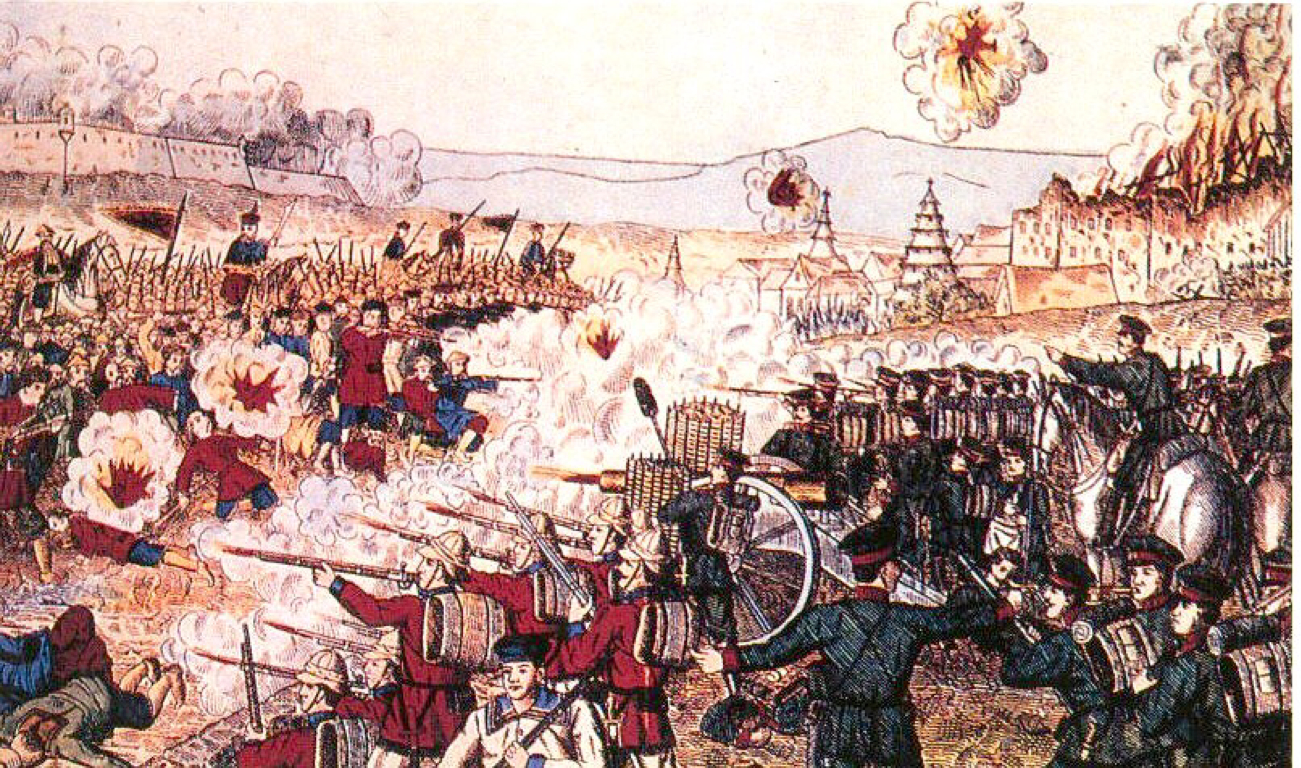
British and Japanese forces engage Boxers in battle

By 1900, many new forms of media had matured, including illustrated newspapers and magazines, postcards, broadsides, and advertisements, all of which presented images of the Boxers and the invading armies. The rebellion was covered in the foreign illustrated press by artists and photographers. Paintings and prints were also published including Japanese woodblocks. In the following decades, the Boxers were a constant subject of comment. A sampling includes:

- Liu E, The Travels of Lao Can sympathetically shows an honest official trying to carry out reforms and depicts the Boxers as sectarian rebels.
- Wu Jianren, Sea of Regret deals with the disintegration of the relationship of a young couple with the Boxer Rebellion in its background.
- Lin Yutang, Moment in Peking covers events in China from 1900 to 1938, including the Boxer Rebellion.
- The 1963 film 55 Days at Peking directed by Nicholas Ray and starring Charlton Heston, Ava Gardner, and David Niven.
- In 1976, Hong Kong's Shaw Brothers studio produced the film Boxer Rebellion (八國聯軍; bāguó liánjūn; Pa Kuo lien chun; 'Eight-Nation Allied Army') under director Chang Cheh.
- The Last Empress (Boston, 2007), by Anchee Min, describes the long reign of the Empress Dowager Cixi in which the siege of the legations is one of the climactic events in the novel.
- Sandalwood Death by Mo Yan. The novel is written from the viewpoint of villagers during the Boxer Uprising.
- Gene Luen Yang's Boxers, a piece of historical fiction written around the event in the form of a graphic novel.

== See also ==
- Gengzi Guobian Tanci
- Imperial Decree on events leading to the signing of Boxer Protocol
- List of 1900–1930 publications on the Boxer Rebellion
- Xishiku Cathedral
