= Imperial decree on events leading to the signing of Boxer Protocol =

1901 edict regarding historiography of the Boxer Rebellion in Qing China

The Imperial decree on events leading to the signing of Boxer Protocol (Chinese: 光緒二十六年十二月二十六日諭; pinyin: Guāngxù èrshíliù nián shí'èr yuè èrshíliù rì yù; lit. 'Decree of the 26th day of the 12th month of the 26th year of the Guangxu era') is an imperial decree issued by the government of the Qing dynasty in the name of the Guangxu Emperor, as an official imperial statement on historical events such as Boxer Rebellion, Eight-Nation Alliance and Battle of Peking and Siege of the International Legations, detailing instructions given to Prince Qing and Li Hongzhang as the full representatives of the imperial court in negotiating a peace treaty with the foreign powers, prior to the official signing of the Boxer Protocol on 7 September 1901. This Imperial decree was officially issued in the name of the Guangxu Emperor and with his official Imperial Seal. The emperor was actually under house arrest at the time, ordered by Empress Dowager Cixi who held full administrative power.

== Background ==
In the times leading to the signing of the Boxer Protocol, the Qing imperial court had issued many decrees in the name of the Guangxu Emperor, but all the political decisions were made by Empress Dowager Cixi.

- Imperial decree on the 10th day of the 5th month: the empress dowager stressed that, "Regardless of whether they are Christian converts or Boxers, they are all patriots, the Imperial Court treats them as equals, Christian and Boxers are the same."
- Imperial decree on the 19th day of the 5th month: On this day, a total of five decrees were issued. Decree No. 1: "I hereby order the Nine Gates Infantry Commander to command imperial forces, including the Peking Field Force, the Tiger Gods Division, with cavalry, in addition to the Wuwei Central Division, to suppress these rebels, to intensify searching patrol; to arrest and execute immediately all criminals with weapons who advocate killing." Again on decree No. 4 of the same day, another imperial order was given to Ronglu, the Nine Gates Infantry Commander: "Ronglu is to send an efficient troops of Wuwei Central Division swiftly, to the Peking Legation Quarter, to protect all the diplomatic buildings, no errors are to be tolerated."
- Imperial decree on the 24th day of the 5th month: In this decree, the empress dowager was requesting military and financial assistance from the viceroys of the southeastern provinces. At the same time, she was also ordering the viceroys to form a joint military force to launch military attacks against foreigners. This decree was rejected by Li Hongzhang and other viceroys.
- Qing Dynasty's Imperial decree of Declaration of War against the Foreign Powers: This decree was the Qing government's official declaration of war against 11 foreign powers. However, according to Lanxin Xiang:

"The official declaration of war was worded in such a strange manner that it indicated nothing more than the strongest form of a persona non-grata note... In effect it was designed to bluff and deter." Quotation from Lanxin Xiang: The origins of the Boxer War: A multinational study. Page xi

- Imperial Decree on the 8th Day of the 6th Month: This decree was issued one week after the declaration of war when imperial forces were ordered to fight the foreigners, showing that the Qing imperial court was serious about protecting the legation staff, and the chief commander in charge of protection was Ronglu.

== Synopsis ==
The Imperial decree began with the events in the summer of 1900, when Prince Qing and Li Hongzhang were given the mandate of full attorney to negotiate with the foreign diplomats for a ceasefire and peace treaty, blaming the Boxer rebels for the rebellion which plunged Beijing into total chaos, while the Guangxu Emperor and Empress Dowager Cixi took refuge to the western provinces for a "hunting trip". The Guangxu Emperor then instructed the two attorney "to measure China's resources in offering foreign nations to their total satisfaction" (量中華之物力，結與國之歡心). Then went on to state that "the Imperial Court has suffered unspeakable hardship and disgrace, it is the Imperial Court's obligation to give a clear explanation to all my ministers and all people under Heaven".

The Imperial decree then stated that it was conflicts and disputes between Boxers and Chinese Christians converts that started the disaster, resulting in the Guangxu Emperor and Empress Dowager feeling "frightened and in danger... extreme confusion, sadness and pain", so much so that they were ready to die for the country, (朕與皇太后誓欲同殉社稷，上謝九廟之靈). In this context, the decree then argues that it was wrong to accuse the Imperial Court for supporting the Boxer rebels, because the Imperial Court had issued many decrees with orders to offer protection for Chinese Catholics, at the same time to ban and eliminate the rioting Boxers, to stop them from "continue to create chaos that will plunge the country into extinction". (既苦禁諭之俱窮，復憤存亡之莫保)"

The decree then placed the full blame on the Boxer rebels for the upheaval, stating: "tens of thousands of rebels, daring to wear red scarfs and carrying knives, roamed the capital, burned and looted churches, besieged and attacked foreign embassies".

County magistrates were accused of being biased in dealing with Christians related disputes, and princes and ministers "were jealous of the military might of the foreigners, did not understand their own shortcomings, were taken in by the devils and the fake. Believing in the magic power of the Boxers", they began to provide boxers with rations and weapons, while the emperor's specific orders to capture the leaders of boxer bandits went unanswered.

The decree then emphasizes on the peace treaty, points out: "On this peace treaty, our sovereignty is kept intact, no territorial land annexation had been requested", reminding the imperial subjects that unlike many other unequal treaties of the past, when there was usually land annexation, though the Imperial Court is: "resentful of (Boxer rebels) ignorant of violent acts, in retrospect, a mix of regret and anger." and also emphasizes on "several decrees were directed at the Zongli Yamen, requesting ministers to go and stop any aggressive attacks and offer solace to the diplomats".

The decree provides an answer to the all-important historical question: Why weren't all the foreigners killed in this siege of nearly two months?

Had the foreign legations being subjected to the full force of bombardment, would those buildings still be intact today? The reason why worse disasters had been avoided, was precisely because the Imperial Court intervened with full force, even frequently sending fruits and beverage to the foreigners. All you foreigners need to understand, and show appreciation that the Empress Dowager has a kind heart.

== See also ==
- Imperial decree of declaration of war against foreign powers
