= List of 1900–1930 publications on the Boxer Rebellion =

List of 1900-1930 publications on Boxer Rebellion is a list of Chinese language publications on the nature of Boxer Rebellion during the early 20th century. The list includes pamphlets, books, local county journals, and other publications.

== Books ==
- 1900 West Hunt Record (Chinese:《庚子西狩丛谈》) Author: Wu Yong (Chinese:吴永)
- Memoir of life in Hangzhou (Chinese:《杭居杂忆》) Author:Wang Shosoon (Chinese:王守恂)
- 1900 National Upheaval (Chinese:《庚子国变记》) Author: Li Xiseng(1864-1905) (Chinese:李希圣)
- 1900 Peking Records of Awards and Compensation (Chinese: 庚子京师褒恤录) Author:Wang Sosoon (Chinese: 王守恂)
- Boxer Bandits Records (Chinese:拳匪纪略) Author:Chiao Qiseng (Chinese:侨析生) 出版社：上洋书局, 清光绪29年(1903) Date of publication:1903
- Tianjin Boxer Bandits Upheaval Records (Chinese:《天津拳匪变乱记事》) Author:Liu Mengyang, (Chinese:刘孟扬) 1901 publication 刘孟扬
- East of Peking Military actions against Bandits telegram records (Chinese:《直东剿匪电存》) 1907 publication
- Boxer Bandits Eyewitness records (Chinese:《拳匪闻见录》) 1911 publication
- Boxer Bandits led to Disaster (Chinese:《拳匪之祸首》) Author: Anonymous, pen name: Ruo Xu (Chinese:若虚) October 1917

== County journal ==
- Chian An County Journal (Chinese:《迁安县志 》) Hebei (Chinese:直隶)
- Sha He County Journal (Chinese:《沙河县志 》) Hebei (Chinese:直隶)
- Xin Xian County Journal (Chinese:《新绛县志》) Shanxi (Chinese:山西)
- Qing Ping County Journal (Chinese:《清平县志 》) Shandong (Chinese:山东)
- Liao Yang County Journal (Chinese:《辽阳县志 》) Liaoning (Chinese:辽宁)
- Kai Yan County Journal (Chinese:《开原县志 》) Liaoning (Chinese:辽宁)
