= Imperial decree of declaration of war against foreign powers =

Qing dynasty edict against Western imperialism in China

- Traditional Chinese: 宣戰詔書
- Simplified Chinese: 宣战诏书
- Literal meaning: Edict declaring war
Transcriptions
Standard Mandarin
- Hanyu Pinyin: Xuānzhàn zhàoshū
- Wade–Giles: Hsüan-chan Chao-shu

The Imperial Decree of declaration of war against foreign powers (Chinese: 宣戰詔書) was a simultaneous declaration of war by the Qing dynasty on 21 June 1900 against a couple foreign powers which held varying degrees of influence in China: Russia, the United States, the United Kingdom, Japan, France, Germany, Italy, Spain, Austria-Hungary, Belgium, and the Netherlands. The declaration of war was one of the Eight-Nation Alliance's formation, which then led to Boxer Protocol. This Imperial decree was officially issued in the name of Guangxu Emperor, bearing his official Imperial seal. The Emperor of China was in effect under house arrest, ordered by Empress Dowager Cixi at that time, and the full administrative power was in the hand of the Empress Dowager.

== The origin of the war ==
Kang Youwei and Liang Qichao were helping the young Guangxu Emperor to start the Hundred Days' Reform, which was "too fast, too ambitious, and lacked any sense of political reality" and they approached Yuan Shikai's help to stage a military coup to topple the conservative forces of the Manchu Court. Yuan Shikai instead of taking side with the reformers, revealed the plot which included the executions of top conservative powers. Empress Dowager fought back by putting the young emperor under house arrest and regained the power at the Court. The Great Powers then showed their support for the emperor, Empress Dowager Cixi fearing that the Guangxu Emperor might fight back with the help of foreigners, issued a royal decree of declaration of war against all eleven of the then Great Powers.

== Motivation for declaring war ==
Up until the last minute, the Empress Dowager remained hesitant. The decision to go to war was essentially a passive one. The official declaration of war was worded in such a strange manner that it indicated nothing more than the strongest form of a persona non grata note... In effect it was designed to bluff and deter.

== See also ==
- Imperial decree on events leading to the signing of Boxer Protocol
