= Battle of Yingkou =

1895 battle of the First Sino-Japanese War

- Part of the First Sino-Japanese War
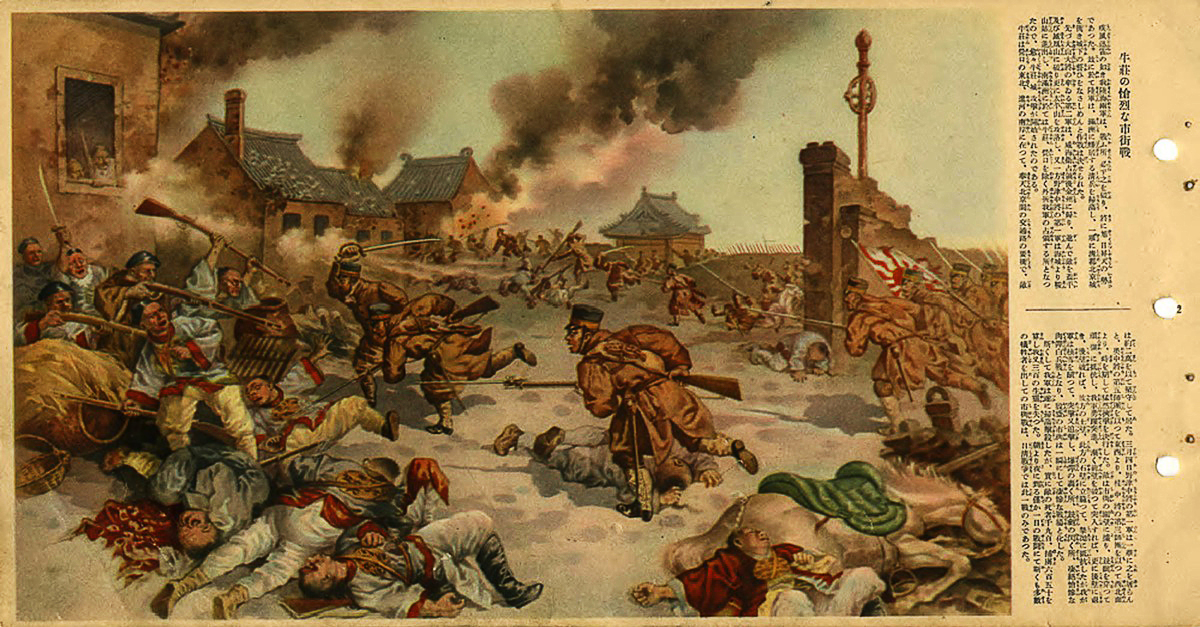
- Battle of Yingkou 1895, Unknown author
| Date | 17 January – 9 March 1895 |
| Location | Yingkou, Liaoning Province, Manchuria |
| Result | Japanese victory |

Belligerents
| Japan | Qing China |

Commanders and leaders
| Nozu Michitsura | Song Qing |

Strength
| 55,800; 108 guns | 40,000 |

Casualties and losses
| 890 | 5,700 killed and wounded 633 taken prisoner total 6,333 all artillery |

The Battle of Yingkou (Japanese: Gyūsō sakusen (牛莊作戦)) was a land battle of the First Sino-Japanese War between the forces of Meiji Japan and Qing China, fought outside the treaty port town of Yingkou, Manchuria. It is sometimes referred to as the Battle of Niuzhuang or Newchwang.

== Background ==
Following the battles of Pyongyang and Jiuliancheng, the Japanese army entered Manchuria. Marshal Yamagata pursued the Qing forces closely, aiming to not let them recuperate and reinforce. On 29 October, the 5th division took Fenghuangcheng unopposed and learned that some of General Song's men were moving to Motienling to link up with the 10,000 men under General I. This would threaten the rear lines of the Japanese if they marched on Haicheng via Hsiumucheng. Therefore, General Nozu decided to move the 10th brigade to Motienling to prevent the Qing armies from linking up. This was successful and on 25 November, the 10th brigade repulsed attacks from both Qing forces and on 30 November, took the offensive and dispersed the Qing armies.

The exhausted Japanese forces returned to Fenghuangcheng and due to logistical issues were unable to prevent General I from linking up with the other Qing forces at Motieling, bringing the Qing forces to at least 10,000 men. General I took the offensive against Fenghuangcheng but was defeated on the 9th and 14 December by the Japanese, who resupplied following the battle. Simultaneously, the 5th brigade under General Katsura Taro was marching on Takushan in pursuit of General Ma's 6,000 strong army fearing it would march to Lushunkou. Therefore, Katsura closely pursued Ma to Haicheng which he took from its 5,000 defenders on 13 December. The fall of Haicheng threw the plan of General Song into disarray as the ability to hold a defensive position on the Liao river became difficult. This was worsened by the Japanese decision to attach the 1st Division to the 1st Army in Manchuria.

General Song decided to attack to re-establish his defensive position. On 18 December, 10,000 Qing forces prepared to storm the town of Niuzhuang but were first attacked by the 5th Brigade and forced to withdraw, suffering 500 casualties to 440 Japanese casualties. The counterattack was also thrown into disarray when, on 10 January, the 1st Brigade took Kaiping (Gaizhou) from its 5,000 strong Qing garrison, inflicting 1,200 losses to 307 Japanese. Qing reinforcements en route from Yingkou numbering 10,000 came across the retreating men and were thrown into a panic and the offensive was halted. To the relief of General Song, the Japanese temporarily halted offensive actions due to exhaustion and they began to reinforce their current positions.

The Qing government, after the fall of Lushunkou and the entry of Japanese forces into Manchuria, mobilised additional men and changed commanders. The Guangxu Emperor relieved Li Hongzhang of his command, handing it over to a 6-man strong committee of Defence headed by Prince Chun. The Committee prioritised the defence of Zhili and organised a 50,000 man strong army at Shanhaiguan and another army of 55,000 in Beijing. The overall commander of the 105,000 men was Liu Kunyi. There were also 80,000 provincial forces within the theatre of operations. However, limited men were available to Song Qing in Manchuria (35,000, not including the 10,000 forces under General I in Liaoyang).

Estimates of Chinese Strength
| Commander | Olender | Esposito (commander not given) | DuBoulay |
|---|---|---|---|
| Song Qing | 40,000 | 20,000 | 26,000 |
| Iko Tenga | 10,000 | 20,000 | 10,000 |
| Zhang Xun | | | 10,000 |
| Wei Guangshou | | | 3,000 |
| Liu Shuyuan | | | 2,000 |
| Nie Shicheng | | | 5,000 |
| Xu Bangdao | | | 6,500 |
| Total | 50,000 | 40,000 | 62,500 |

The Chinese were also raising forces during the war as a whole with 7,000 new troops being brought into the field in February raised by General Ikotenga. Additionally, 2,000 volunteers were accepted into the army and assigned 3 artillery batteries.

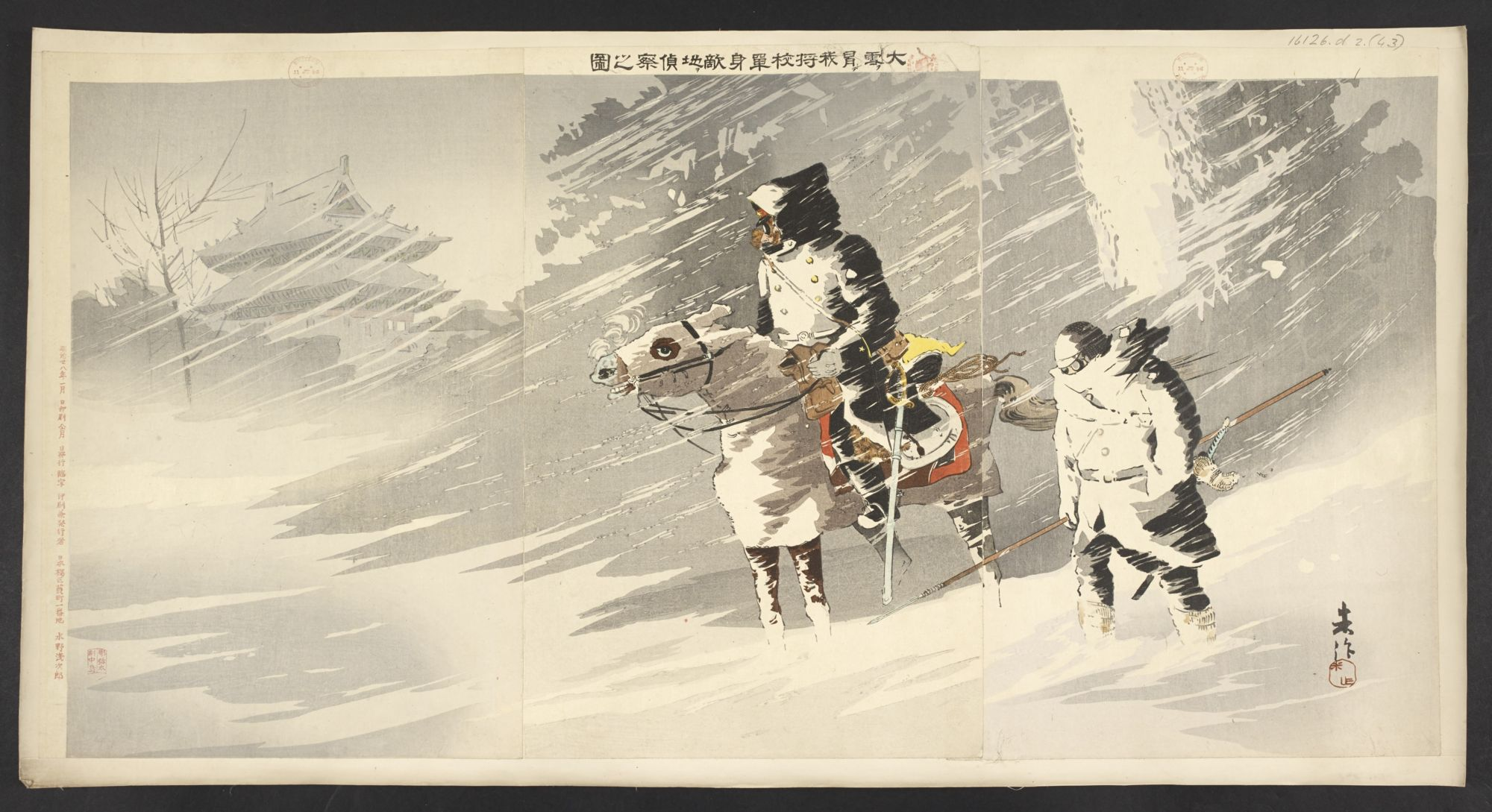
The harsh winter weather in Manchuria was an impediment the Japanese army overcame in its war against the Qing successfully maintaining its offensive.

=== Chinese Counter offensive ===
Nonetheless, Song Qing endeavoured to take the offensive, aiming to retake Haicheng and Kaiping. However, despite an attack with 20,000 men, he was defeated by the 5th Japanese Brigade (there were a total of 30,000 Japanese soldiers in the region) and suffered 300 casualties to Japan's 41. Song, however, was undeterred and launched 2 more offensives. The Chinese offensives lasted from 17 January to 21 February. General Nozu decided to take advantage of Chinese exhaustion and launched his own counter offensive.

On 16 February 15,000 soldiers attacked Haicheng in 3 columns commanded Zhang Xun, I K'o t'ang and Xu, however this assault was repulsed by the Japanese and the Chinese suffered 150 casualties and the Japanese 14, the next day a battalion of the Japanese 3rd division and elements of the 2nd reserve infantry were attacked by 1,000 bandits but these were repulsed. On the 21st the Chinese once again approached Haicheng but beside long range artillery fire no attack was made simultaneously, both sides received reinforcements in the region.

The Chinese side had received 10,000 men under Wu Dacheng who departed Shanhaiguan for the Japanese their reinforcements consisted of elements of the 1st Division which was dispatched on the 20th the Japanese accordingly extended their frontline to Taping-shan a large hill 2 miles long and 60 metres high which was of considerable military importance. This however was re-taken by troops under Ma Yukun on the 21st. General Yamaji gathered the 1st division and retook the hill on the 24th the Chinese lingered in the villages beyond the hill and Yamaji attempted to drive them off solely with artillery fire in fear of overstretching his forces but this was insufficient and the infantry was sent in and the Chinese withdrew from the vicinity of the hill. Japanese casualties for the battle of the hill were 250 and 1,500 were afflicted with frostbite. Chinese losses are at least 800 wounded.

== The battle ==
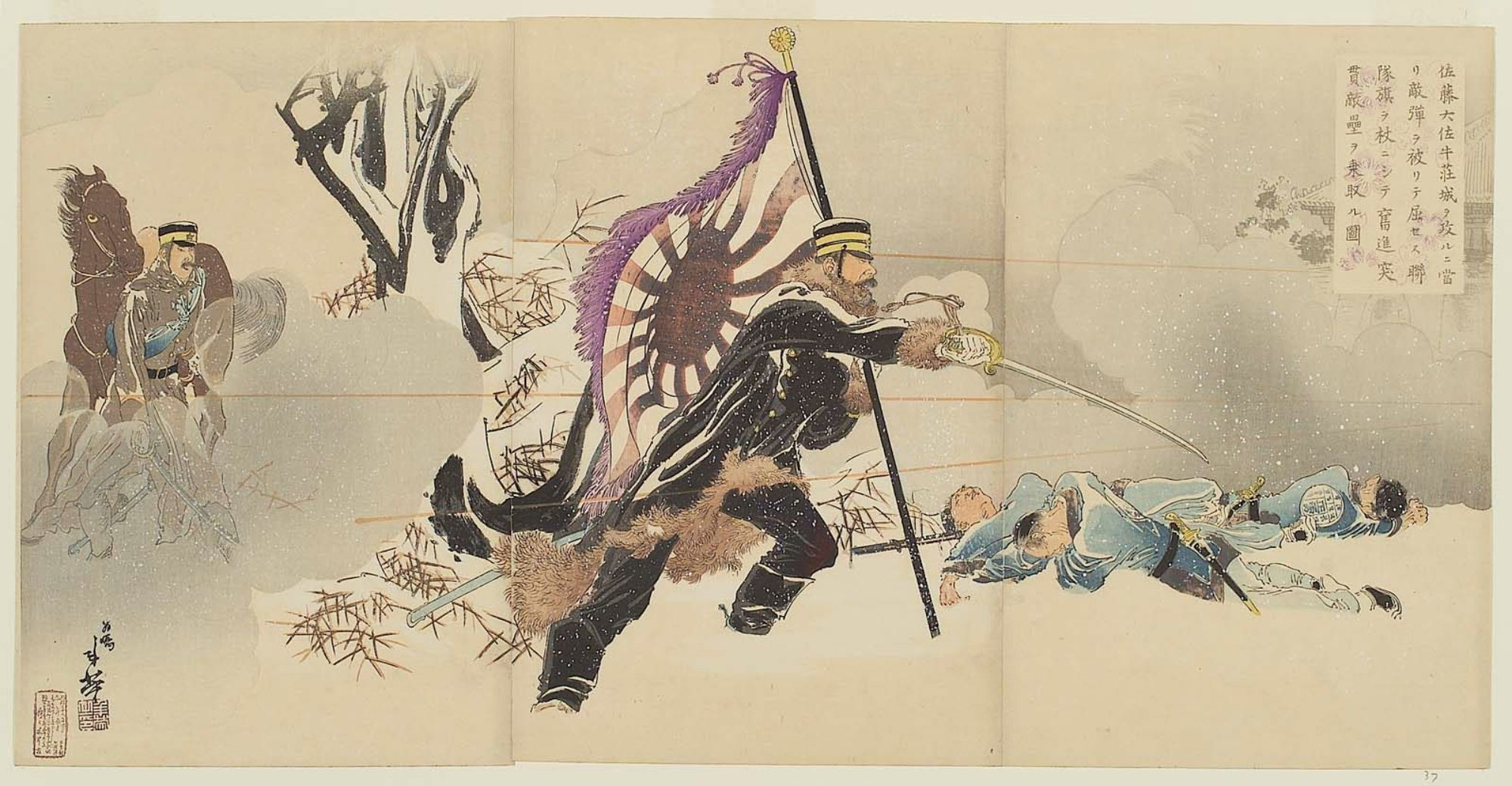
Colonel Sato attacking a fortification at Niuzhuang, engraved by Toshihide Migita.

On 28 February, Japanese forces under General Nozu Michitsura began a counterattack against Liaoyang and Niuzhuang, beginning with an artillery barrage and followed with an infantry offensive across a wide front. The Qing forces were driven in disorderly retreat to the north and northwest towards Jinzhou, offering only light and sporadic resistance. A portion of the Japanese army under Lieutenant General Katsura Tarō pursued the retreating Chinese to the walls of Liaoyang by 3 March, while the main force with the 3rd and IJA 5th Divisions under General Nozu reached Niuzhuang and Liaoyang by 4 March. Chinese losses on the 28th amounted to over 400 and the Japanese 124. 2,500 Chinese under General Xu marched on Haicheng again attacking the western defences but were repulsed by the 1st division.

On 3 March the 3rd and 5th Japanese divisions attacked Niuzhuang after a two-hour-long artillery barrage, Qing forces abandoned the walls of Niuzhuang with almost no resistance, fleeing into town. A total of 3,000 Qing soldiers were defending the town (given as 5,000 men of the Huai army by Du Boulay but 2,000 fled before the battle) against the Japanese 5th Division (6,000 men and 24 guns of this division took part) and the 3rd Division. Following fierce fighting, Qing forces abandoned the town with 1,900 killed and wounded with 633 taken prisoner by Japanese forces. Japanese casualties were 70 killed and 319 wounded. The fighting in Niuzhuang was fierce as regular combat yielded little by 5pm on the day the Japanese decided to systematically destroy the houses in the town bringing their guns to fire directly on Chinese positions this continued until 11 pm when the remaining troops surrendered DuBoulay gives casualties as 389 Japanese and 3,000 for the Chinese 2,000 dead 633 prisoners the rest unknown.

Whilst fighting was occurring at Niuzhuang, the rest of the 1st Division and the 3rd Division assaulted Yingkou and General Song decided to withdraw to Tianzhuangtai, abandoning Yingkou to avoid encirclement. When Japanese forces arrived on the 7th, there was sporadic resistance and the port town fell quickly. The Japanese also captured the gunboat Mei Yuan and 2 transports trapped by the ice.

Though the battles were losses for the Chinese, the Qing forces were able to recuperate and the day following the battle, General Song managed to gather 11,000 men at Tianzhuangtai to continue fighting. General Nozu, not willing to let the Chinese troops to recuperate, reinforce, and strengthen their defenses, pushed on once again. The 5th Brigade was left as a garrison at Niuzhuang and Yingkou as the rest of the Japanese forces fell upon the Chinese at Tianzhuangtai. Chinese forces put up slight resistance and were successfully dispersed by the Japanese with 2,000 Chinese casualties and the capture of the entire Chinese artillery force. Japanese losses were 16 killed and 144 wounded. The army of Song Qing ceased to exist as an organised force as a consequence of the battle.

DuBoulay gives an alternate account of the battle stating that there were 30,000 Chinese and 30 guns Wu Dacheng had fled before the battle began though his 10,000 troops remained with 20,000 of Song's. The battle began on the 9th with the attack of 91 Japanese guns. The 5th Division attacked and outflanked the 3,000 Chinese guarding upriver who withdrew simultaneously the 2nd brigade outflanked the Chinese downriver whilst the 3rd division engaged the Chinese frontally, following the dispersal of the Chinese upriver strong resistance by the Chinese ended and they attempted to flee many did so others were shot by the 1st and 5th divisions. The Chinese forces withdrew to Jinzhou having suffered 2,000 losses to 160 Japanese. Full-scale combat in Manchuria ended with the defeat at Tianzhuangtai with only small action between Chinese local forces and the Japanese in the Manchurian hills.

However, it was still estimated that there were 200,000 men between Shanhaiguan and Beijing not including those in Manchuria the quality of these troops however was considered dubious as the best of the Chinese army had already been routed.

The victory at Yingkou gave the Japanese complete control over Southewestern Manchuria as well as control over the port of Yingkou (ice-free from April), solving the logistical issue of supplying a large army far from the Japanese mainland. It also provided a base of operations for actions against Zhili and Beijing. The Japanese planned for an offensive against the capital city of Beijing. The 1st Army, consisting of the 1st and 3rd Divisions, would march towards Shanhaiguan whilst the 5th Division remained in Manchuria as a garrison force. Simultaneously, the 2nd and 6th Divisions, in reserve at Dalian, would be replaced by the 4th Division and Imperial Guards Division (still in Japan) and the two divisions would act against either Shanhaiguan or the Grand Canal, depending on the circumstances. However, planning for these operations was halted after a truce was signed.

== Aftermath of the battle ==
The capture of Yingkou marks the effective end of major combat on the Asian mainland in the First Sino-Japanese War, although the Imperial Japanese Army continued to push for permission from Imperial General Headquarters to continue on towards either Beijing or Mukden. The Japanese landed 200 marines on 27 March at Ganyu, adjacent to the Grand Canal. The capture of these fortifications placed the Japanese within 50 miles of the strategic Grand Canal connecting Beijing with Nanjing. This applied more pressure on the Qing government to finalize discussions on ending the war, as did the Capture of the Pescadores near Taiwan at the end of March. Negotiations for the Treaty of Shimonoseki, which had begun on 20 March, were finalized by the Qing surrender on 17 April, ending the war.
