= China Relief Expedition =

Expedition to China

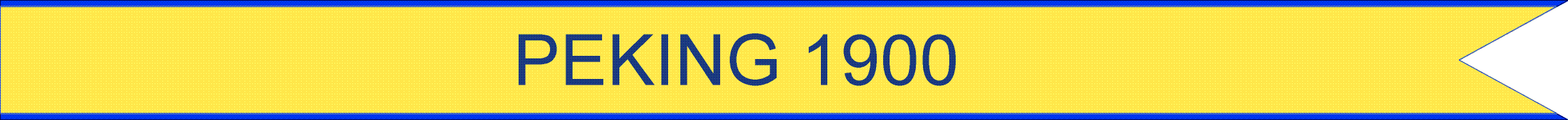
China Relief Expedition Streamer

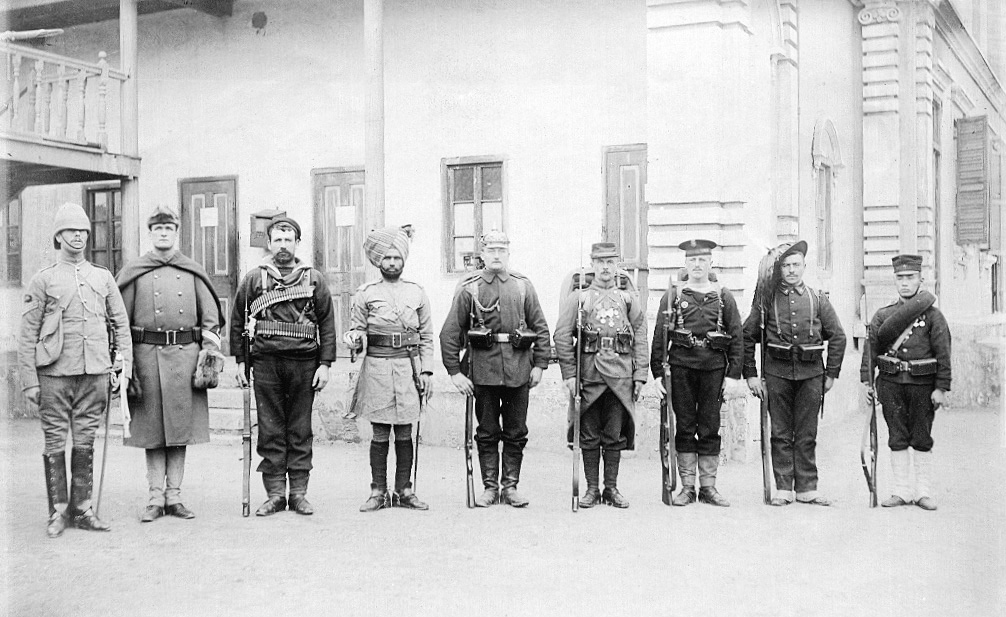
The Eight-Nation Alliance

The China Relief Expedition was an expedition in China undertaken by the United States Armed Forces to rescue United States citizens, European nationals, and other foreign nationals during the latter years of the Boxer Rebellion, which lasted from 1898 to 1901. The China Relief Expedition was part of a multi-national military effort known as the Eight-Nation Alliance to which the United States contributed troops between 1900 and 1901. Towards the close of the expedition, the focus shifted from rescuing non-combatants to suppressing the rebellion. By 1902, at least in the city of Beijing (Peking), the Boxer Rebellion had been effectively controlled.

== Background ==
The American annexation of the Philippines resulting from the Spanish–American War stimulated a growing American interest in China for both commercial and humanitarian reasons. The Philippines served as a convenient way point for trade with the Qing China, and would be of use in the protection of American interests in the Pacific. The dominant problem in China at the end of the nineteenth century was its threatened partition by the Great Powers. Both the United States and the British opposed this, and in September 1899 the United States announced it had secured agreement from the interested powers for maintenance of an Open Door policy in their relations with China.

Many Chinese resented the extensive foreign intervention in China. This discontent coalesced into the nucleus of a secret group called the Righteous Harmony Society (義和團, yìhétuán); Westerners called them Boxers. The Boxers, with the support of Prince Duan, undertook a campaign against foreign influences and foreigners. By early 1900 this movement had brought much of China to the verge of revolution. Boxers in the northern provinces attacked and killed hundreds of Chinese Christians and foreigners, mostly missionaries. The wave of unrest came to an apex following the assassination of Clemens von Ketteler, the German ambassador plenipotentiary, on June 20. The Chinese government then broke off diplomatic relations and demanded that all foreigners leave immediately, promising safe escort. About 3,500 foreigners and Chinese Christians refused to leave, and fearing for their safety, took refuge in the foreign legation compound, where they were besieged. A composite military force of 407 men (including 56 Americans) plus about 200 civilians defended the compound.

The Great Powers took immediate steps to organize a large relief expedition for Beijing, to stamp out what came to be known as the Boxer Rebellion. Although the William McKinley administration disliked the idea of becoming involved in an international incident with overtones of entangling foreign alliances during an election year, President McKinley agreed to join with the other powers to take steps to rescue their beleaguered nationals.

=== Seymour Expedition ===
The Seymour Expedition (10–26 June), an international column of Sailors and Marines, including 112 Americans, made a hurried attempt to relieve Beijing, but failed to get through when it met with severe resistance after it left Tianjin, the nearest port city to Beijing.

=== Skirmishes around Tianjin ===
As a result of the Philippine–American War, the United States had forces available nearby in the Philippines, and was therefore in a position to contribute one of the larger contingents to the international relief expedition. The first American forces left the Philippines on June 14. A detachment of 107 Marines went to China to protect American lives and property; this detachment was drawn from the 1st Marine Infantry Regiment stationed at Cavite. This detachment steamed toward Taku aboard the USS Newark, arriving on June 18, where they joined by 32 Marines aboard the USS Nashville (PG-7). Under the command of Major Littleton W.T. Waller, the detachment landed at Taku the next day and advanced toward Tianjin.

Although General Arthur MacArthur Jr., commanding in the Philippines, was reluctant to weaken his already overextended forces, he agreed to dispatch to China the 9th Infantry Regiment, which departed from Manila on June 27 aboard USAT Logan. On June 17 the United States Navy's China Squadron under Rear Admiral Louis Kempff declined to join foreign naval forces in the Battle of Taku Forts, which guarded the river approach to Tianjin. On July 6 the 9th Infantry Regiment arrived at Taku. Colonel Emerson H. Liscum, commander of the 9th Infantry Regiment, disembarked the regiment's 1st and 2nd Battalions and marched on Tianjin. On 13 July 1900 elements of this force participated in the attack on Tianjin troops from several other nations. The city of Tianjin fell to the Allies on the same day. Liscum and the flag bearer of the regiment were killed by Chinese snipers, the 9th infantry regiment suffered a ten percent casualty rate.

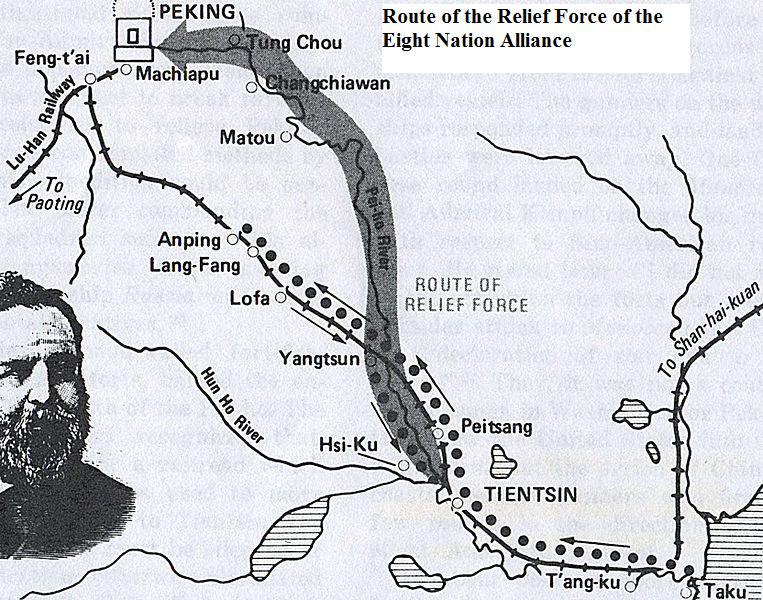
The route of the China Relief Expedition from Tianjin to Beijing.

By the beginning of August, the American forces were reinforced by the 14th Infantry Regiment, and Battery F of the 5th Artillery Regiment. Major General Adna R. Chaffee Sr arrived in Nagasaki, Japan, on July 24. Within two days of his arrival, General Chaffee received orders to proceed to Taku and assume command of the American forces there; his new command was designated the China Relief Expedition.

Other units, including the 6th Cavalry Regiment, were deployed directly from the mainland United States. Using Manila as a base and Nagasaki as an advance port, the United States eventually assembled some 2,500 soldiers and Marines in China.

== Battle of Peking ==
By early August a multinational coalition of 19,000 soldiers, including British, French, Japanese, Russian, German, Austrian, Italian, and American troops, was ready to move out of Tianjin toward Beijing, some seventy miles distant. High points of the fighting en route were at Beicang, which fell on 5 August, and a severe engagement for American and British contingents at Yangcun on 6 August. The force reached the Qing capital on 12 August 1900 and prepared immediately to assault the gates leading into the Outer City. Lacking effective central direction, the relief expedition's attack was poorly executed. The Russian contingent prematurely forced an entrance into the Outer City on 10 August, only to be ambushed by waiting Chinese soldiers and require rescue by other allied troops. In the seizure of the Outer City of Beijing on 14 August, elements of the 14th Infantry scaled the Tartar Wall, planted the first foreign flag ever to fly there, and opened the way for British units to relieve the legation compound. Then on 15 August, Captain Henry J. Reilly's Light Battery F of the U.S. 5th Artillery shattered the gates leading into the Inner City with several well-placed salvos, opening the way for the allied troops to occupy the center of Beijing. Although American troops had suffered comparatively light losses—slightly more than 200 killed and wounded—they did not take part in subsequent military operations, which consisted primarily of suppressing scattered Boxer elements and rescuing foreigners in the provinces. Most American units were withdrawn to Manila before winter, and mopping up operations in the provinces were left to the other Powers. A few American Regulars remained to form part of an allied occupation force and a small guard for the United States Legation in Beijing.

== Aftermath ==
In a few months the Allies offered peace terms to the Dowager Empress, which included the payment of an indemnity and reaffirm previously existing commercial concessions. During prolonged negotiations an international army of occupation to which the United States contributed a small contingent of Regulars remained in north China. It was withdrawn in September 1901 under terms of the Boxer Protocol. This agreement also provided that the powers maintain a fortified legation in Beijing, garrison the Tianjin-Beijing Railway—an American contingent served as a part of this force until 1938—and receive reparations of $333 million. Of this amount the United States claimed only $25 million. In a few years it became apparent that even this sum was more than was needed to indemnify claims of American nationals and in 1907, and again in 1924, the United States returned portions totaling nearly $17 million to China, which placed the money in a trust fund for education of Chinese youths in both countries.

The participation of the United States in the Boxer Uprising marked the first time since the American Revolution that the country had joined with other powers in an allied military operation. The intervention in China represented an instance of the gradual change taking place in the traditional policies and attitudes of the United States in world affairs as a result of the triumph of imperialism. Most Americans still believed, despite the acquisition of overseas colonies, the nation could continue to adhere to its doctrine of isolationism. Developments in the early years of the 20th century would demonstrate, however, that the nation had to make changes and adjustments in many long-established institutions and policies—including those relating to military defense of the country—to meet the requirements of its new status as a world power.

== United States military medals ==
For serving during the China Relief Expedition, the United States military created the China Campaign Medal and the China Relief Expedition Medal.

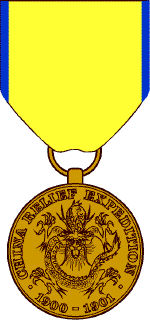
China Campaign Medal

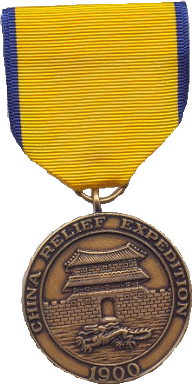
China Relief Expedition Medal

== US regiments involved ==
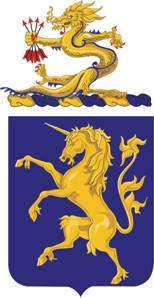
6th Cavalry Regiment (United States)

9th Infantry Regiment (United States)

14th Infantry Regiment (United States)

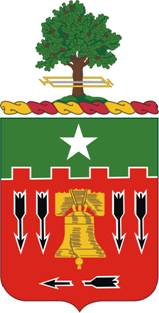
5th Field Artillery Regiment

== Streamer ==
The China Relief Expedition streamer is yellow with a narrow blue stripe on each side. The color yellow was restricted for use only by the Manchu rulers of China during the Qing dynasty (1644–1911). The color blue is emblematic of the East and of the blue dragon depicted on the yellow imperial and the Eight Banner standards.

== Sources ==
- American Military History: Emergence to World Power, 1898–1902. Chapter 15; Office of the Chief of Military History, United States Army

- Giuseppe Salvago Raggi: The Only Man Dressing for Dinner. Gingko Edizioni, 2019 Verona Chapter
