= Battle of the Yalu River =

Battle of the Yalu River may refer to:

- Battle of the Yalu River (1894), during the First Sino-Japanese War
- Battle of the Yalu River (1904), during the Russo-Japanese War
- Battle of Jiuliancheng, sometimes call the Battle of the Yalu River, an 1894 land battle of the Sino-Japanese War
