= China Campaign Medal =

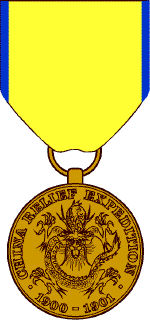
- Obverse
- Type: Medal
- Awarded for: Service ashore in China with the Peking Relief Expedition between June 20, 1900 and May 27, 1901.
- Presented by: Department of War
- Eligibility: Perform duty within the borders of China as part of the China Relief Expedition.
- Status: Obsolete
- Ribbon and streamer

The China Campaign Medal is a decoration of the United States Army which was created by order of the United States War Department on January 12, 1905. The medal recognizes service in the China Relief Expedition which was conducted by the United States Army at the turn on the 20th century during the Boxer Rebellion.

== Description and history ==
The medal and its ribbon

To be awarded the China Campaign Medal, a service member must have performed military duty in China, between June 20, 1900, and May 27, 1901, with such duty being in service of the China Relief Expedition. For those service members who were cited for gallantry in action, the Citation Star is authorized as a device to the China Campaign Medal.

The United States Navy equivalent of the China Campaign Medal was the China Relief Expedition Medal.

=== Obverse ===
On the obverse is the Imperial Chinese five-toed dragon with the inscription CHINA RELIEF EXPEDITION around the upper border and the dates 1900–1901 at the bottom.

=== Reverse ===
On the reverse is a trophy composed of an eagle perched on a cannon supported by crossed flags, rifles, an Indian shield, spear and quiver of arrows, a Cuban machete, and a Sulu kris. Below the trophy are the words FOR SERVICE. Around the border at the top are the words UNITED STATES ARMY and around the bottom are thirteen stars.

=== Ribbon ===
The ribbon is 1 3/8 inches wide and is composed of the following vertical stripes: 1/16 inch Ultramarine blue, 1 1/4 inch Golden yellow, and 1/16 inch Ultramarine Blue.

=== Streamers ===
Army units which received credit for campaign participation may display the streamer on the organizational flag. The inscription will be as indicated on the unit's lineage and honors.

There are three streamers displayed on the Army flag to represent the China Relief Expedition. The inscriptions are:

- TIENTSIN 1900
- YANG-TSUN 1900
- PEKING 1900

== See also ==
- List of military decorations
- Awards and decorations of the United States military
- Military Order of the Dragon
