= Invasion of Manchuria =

Invasion of Manchuria can refer to:

- Japanese invasion of Manchuria (1894)
- Russian invasion of Manchuria (1900)
- Japanese invasion of Manchuria (1931)
- Soviet invasion of Manchuria (1945)
