= Nikolai Linevich =

Russian military leader

Nikolai Petrovich Linevich
- Николай Петровичъ Линевичъ (Note: Pre-1918 Russian orthography)
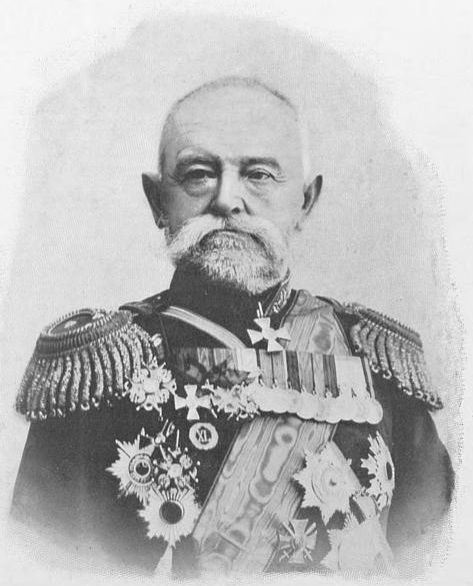
- General Nikolai P. Linevich
- Born: 5 January 1839; Chernigov, Russian Empire
- Died: 10 April 1908 (aged 69); Saint Petersburg, Russian Empire
- Military career
- Allegiance: Russian Empire
- Branch: Imperial Russian Army
- Service years: 1855–1906
- Rank: General
- Commands: Imperial Russian Army
- Conflicts: Russo-Turkish War; Boxer Rebellion; Siege of the International Legations; Seymour Expedition; Battle of Beicang; Gaselee Expedition; Battle of Yangcun; Battle of Peking; Russo-Japanese War; Battle of Mukden

Nikolai Petrovich Linevich, also Lenevich and Linevitch (Ukrainian: Линевич Микола Петрович, Russian: Линевич Николай Петрович; 5 January 1839 [O.S. 24 December 1838] – 23 April [O.S. 10 April] 1908) was a career military officer, General of Infantry (1903) and Adjutant general in the Imperial Russian Army in the Far East during the latter part of the Russo-Japanese War.

== Biography ==
A nobleman born in Chernigov (today's Chernihiv in Ukraine), Linevich entered military service as a cadet in 1855. Stationed with the 75th Infantry Regiment at Sevastopol, his first combat experience was against the mountain tribes of the western Caucasus Mountains. He made a name for himself in the Russo-Turkish War (1877–1878), and was appointed commander of the South Ussuri Division in 1895.

During the Boxer Rebellion, Linevich was commander of the 1st Siberian Army Corps. He participated in the Battle of Peking in 1900. In 1903, he was appointed commander of the Amur Military District as Governor-General of Dauria.

At the outbreak of the Russo-Japanese War, Linevich was temporarily in charge of the Russian Manchurian Army until the arrival of General Aleksey Kuropatkin on 15 March 1904. He was again placed in command of the First Manchurian Army from October 1904 to 3 March 1905. After the Russian defeat at the Battle of Mukden, General Kuropatkin was relieved of his command, and Linevich was promoted to succeed him as commander in chief of the Russian armies in the Far East. However, once promoted, Linevich procrastinated, irking Tsar Nicholas II with never-ending demands for reinforcements, insisting that he had to have a 1.5:1 numerical superiority before he would be able to go on the offensive against the Japanese positions. He opposed peace negotiations with Japan, advising Tsar Nicholas that victory on land was certain once the requisite reinforcements arrived. After the Treaty of Portsmouth ended the war, Linevich oversaw the evacuation of Russian forces from Manchuria, hampered by strikes and revolutionary agitation by the railroad workers. He refused to take action against the workers, and when a portion of his troops revolted as part of the Russian Revolution of 1905, he was in no hurry to put down the risings. As a result, he was relieved of his duties in February 1906. Linevich spent the rest of his life in retirement. His wartime journal (The Russian-Japanese War. From the diaries AN Kuropatkin and NP Linevich) was published posthumously in 1925.

== Honors ==
- Order of St. George, 3rd class, August 1900
- Order of St. George, 4th class
- Order of St Vladimir, 3rd degree,
- Order of St Vladimir, 4th degree
- Order of St. Anne 3rd degree
- Order of Saint Stanislaus 3rd degree
- Order of Leopold, 1st degree (Belgium)
- Order of the Rising Sun, 1st degree, (Japan)
- Order of St. Andrew

== Notes ==
- This article is based on a translation of the equivalent article of the Russian Wikipedia on 5 January 2011.

== Sources ==
- Connaughton, R.M (1988). The War of the Rising Sun and the Tumbling Bear—A Military History of the Russo-Japanese War 1904–5, London, ISBN 0-415-00906-5.
- Jukes, Geoffry. The Russo-Japanese War 1904–1905. Osprey Essential Histories. (2002). ISBN 978-1-84176-446-7.
- Kowner, Rotem (2006). Historical Dictionary of the Russo-Japanese War. The Scarecrow Press. ISBN 0-8108-4927-5.
- Warner, Denis & Peggy. The Tide at Sunrise, A History of the Russo-Japanese War 1904–1905. (1975). ISBN 0-7146-5256-3.
