= Federico Tommaso Paolini =

Italian naval captain (1873–1926)

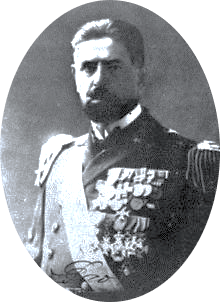
- Born: 2 May 1873; Turin, Piedmont, Italy
- Died: 18 April 1926 (aged 52); Gaeta, Lazio, Italy
- Education: Italian Naval Academy
- Military career
- Allegiance: Kingdom of Italy
- Branch: Regia Marina
- Service years: 1894–1926
- Rank: Capitano di fregata
- Commands: San Marco Marine Brigade
- Conflicts: Boxer Rebellion: Battle of Peking; Italo-Turkish War; World War I
- Awards: Gold Medal of Military Valor; War Merit Cross (awarded two times)

Federico Tommaso Paolini (2 May 1873 – 18 April 1926) was an Italian naval captain of the early 20th century. He served his home country throughout the Boxer Rebellion, the Italo-Turkish War and World War I, being known as the Italian commander of the relief forces at the Battle of Peking.

== Early career and Boxer Rebellion ==
Federico Tommaso Paolini was born in Turin on 2 May 1873. After attending the Italian Naval Academy in Livorno, he was appointed Midshipman in 1894. On 30 May 1900, following his landing on China aboard the cruiser Elba, he assumed command of 40 Italian relief soldiers to serve as reinforcements for the defense of the international legations in Beijing alongside fellow naval lieutenant Angelo Olivieri who was later dispatched to deal with the Siege of Beitang. During the resistance of the 30 Italian sailors he commanded, 7 died of war wounds. On 1 July, during yet another Boxer attack, he coordinated the attack on a barricade which, despite being protected by a cannon, was bravely destroyed by his troops despite Paolini himself being wounded in the shoulder during the attack. For the direction of the latter operation, Paolini was awarded the Gold Medal of Military Valor.

== World War I ==
Returning to Italy, he was in command of the steamship Favignana, the auxiliary cruiser Città di Messina and the submarine Argo which he commanded during the Italo-Turkish War. He took part in World War I with the command of surface torpedo units, the submarines Salpa, Marcello and, later, the destroyer Curtatone. He was promoted to Captain in 1923, after which he assumed command of the Maritime Defense of Taranto before later assuming command of the Directorate of the Arsenal of Castellammare di Stabia and the command of the Maritime Military Defense of La Spezia. Subsequently he was in command of the cruiser Falco from 16 January 1926 until his unexpected death on 18 April that same year at Gaeta.
