= Adna Chaffee =

2nd Chief of Staff of the United States Army

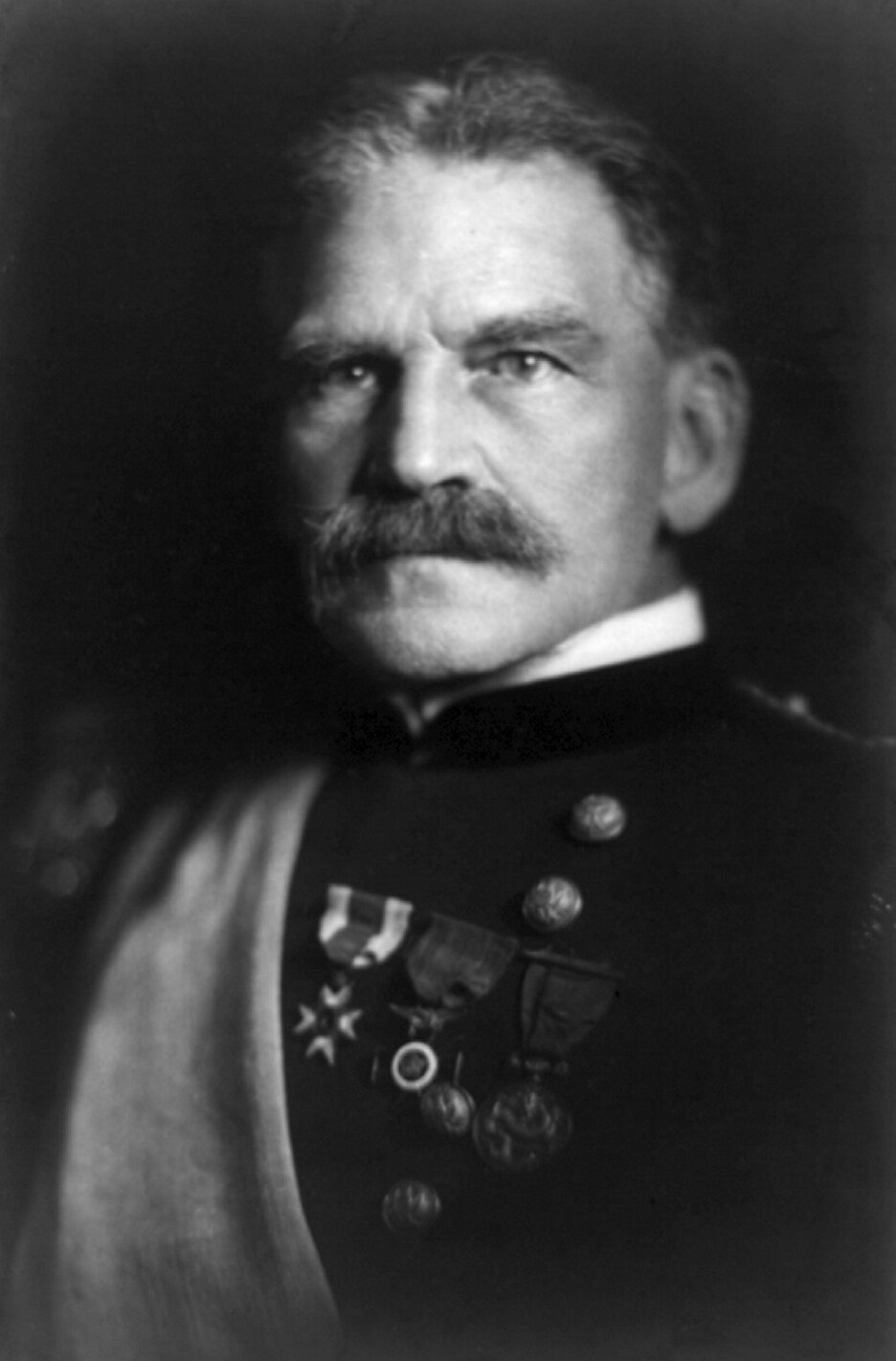
- General Adna Chaffee

4th Military Governor of the Philippines
- In office July 4, 1901 – July 4, 1902
- Preceded by: Arthur MacArthur Jr.
- Succeeded by: William Howard Taft (as Civilian Governor-General of the Philippines)

Personal details
- Born: April 14, 1842 Orwell, Ohio, U.S.
- Died: November 1, 1914 (aged 72) Los Angeles, California, U.S.
- Resting place: Arlington National Cemetery
- Relations: Adna R. Chaffee Jr. (son)

Military service
- Allegiance: United States
- Branch/service: United States Army
- Years of service: 1861–1906
- Rank: Lieutenant General
- Commands: Chief of Staff of the United States Army; Department of the East; China Relief Expedition
- Battles/wars: American Civil War; Peninsular Campaign; Maryland Campaign; Battle of Gettysburg (WIA); Appomattox campaign; Battle of Dinwiddie Court House; Indian Wars; Battle of Paint Creek; Battle of Red River; Battle of Big Dry Wash; Spanish–American War; Cuban Campaign; Boxer Rebellion; Battle of Peking; Philippine–American War; Samar campaign; Post-war insurgency

Adna Romanza Chaffee (April 14, 1842 – November 1, 1914) was a lieutenant general in the United States Army. Chaffee took part in the American Civil War and Indian Wars, played a key role in the Spanish–American War, and fought in the Boxer Rebellion in China. He was the Chief of Staff of the United States Army from 1904 to 1906, overseeing far-reaching transformation of organization and doctrine in the army.

== Early life and Civil War ==
Chaffee was born in Orwell, Ohio. When the American Civil War broke out in July 1861, Chaffee joined the U.S. 6th Cavalry Regiment. In 1862, Chaffee was promoted to sergeant and took part in the Peninsular Campaign and the Battle of Antietam. In September of that year he was made the first sergeant of Company K. He was commissioned as a second lieutenant in May 1863. His 6th Cavalry, on detached service from General John Buford's 1st Union Cavalry Division, though outnumbered, attacked a Confederate Cavalry regiment at Fairfield, Pennsylvania, just outside Gettysburg on July 3, 1863 (source, Wittenberg, Eric: Gettysburg: Forgotten Cavalry Actions). In the ensuing action, he was wounded and briefly held a prisoner by the Confederates. He served with the 6th Cavalry for the remainder of the war, being twice wounded. In February 1865, he was promoted to first lieutenant. For his "gallant and meritorious" actions in the Battle of Dinwiddie Court House he was brevetted captain.

After the war, Chaffee became a member of the Military Order of the Loyal Legion of the United States.

== Indian Wars ==
Chaffee decided to remain with the army after the war. He was posted to the western frontier, and was promoted to captain of Regulars in October 1867. For the next thirty years he served in the Indian Wars, fighting the Central Plains and Southwestern tribes. In 1868, he was brevetted major for his actions at Paint Creek, Texas. In the following years, he engaged the Native Americans many times, most notably at Red River, Texas, in 1874, and Big Dry Wash, Arizona Territory, in 1882, for which he was brevetted lieutenant colonel.

In July 1888, he was promoted to major and transferred to the 9th Cavalry. From 1894 to 1896, he was an instructor of tactics at the Army's Infantry and Cavalry School at Fort Leavenworth. In June 1897 he was promoted to colonel and transferred to the 3rd Cavalry, where he served as commandant of the Cavalry School at Fort Riley until 1898.

== Spanish–American War ==
With the outbreak of the Spanish–American War in 1898, Chaffee was assigned a brigade and was promoted to brigadier general of volunteers in May of that year, and in July after the victory at El Caney, to major general of volunteers. From late 1898 to May 1900, he served as the chief of staff to the military governor of Cuba, General Leonard Wood, being promoted to colonel of regulars in May 1899. He was a member of Society of the Army of Santiago, a military society for officers who had served in Cuba.

== Boxer Rebellion ==
In June 1900, the Boxer Rebellion broke out in China. Colonel Chaffee was sent to China in July as the commander of the U.S. Army's China Relief Expedition. The Expedition was a part of the international force sent to rescue Western and Japanese citizens and put down the rebellion. Chaffee arrived at Taku Bay, China aboard USAT Grant to take command on 29 July 1900. Chaffee participated in the Gaselee Expedition and subsequently the Battle of Peking, in which the legations were relieved. In 1900–1901 American forces were included in the Allied occupation of Peking (Beijing). As American commander Chaffee began public health, relief, and police operations in cooperation with Chinese officials.

According to Chaffee, "[I]t is safe to say that where one real Boxer has been killed, fifty harmless coolies or laborers, including not a few women and children, have been slain."

Chaffee concluded that Chinese respected only the superior power. Reassigned to the Philippines he applied the lessons there, combining benevolence and public health measures with force and cooperation with local officials.

Chaffee was one of the founders of the Military Order of the Dragon, a military society for officers who had served in China during the Boxer Rebellion. He served as the society's president from its founding in 1900 until his death.

== Philippines and retirement ==
In February 1901, Chaffee was promoted to major general in the Regular Army. From July of that year until October 1902, he served as commander of American forces in the Philippines, following the dissolution of the American military government under General Arthur MacArthur Jr. and the institution of civilian rule under governor-general William Howard Taft. Chaffee commanded U.S. troops during the final months of the primary phase of the Philippine–American War. In December 1901, he assigned General Jacob H. Smith to deal with anti-American resistance in the province of Samar, resulting in an ill-fated campaign that led to the deaths of up to 2,000 Filipino civilians. Chaffee became a member of the Military Order of the Carabao for Philippine veterans, and also served as Paramount Carabao for a time.

In October 1902, Chaffee became commander of the Department of the East, a position he held until October 1903. In January 1904, he was promoted to lieutenant general and, from January 9, 1904, until January 14, 1906, served as the Chief of Staff of the United States Army. At his own request, Chaffee was retired on February 1, 1906.

General Chaffee was invested with the Grand Cross of the Legion of Honor by the president of France. In 1905 he became an honorary member of the New York Society of the Cincinnati.

In his retirement, he moved to Los Angeles, where he was appointed president of the Board of Public Works for the city of Los Angeles.

== Family ==
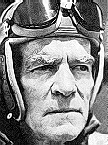
Adna Chaffee Jr.

Chaffee was married twice; in September 1867 he married Kate Haynie Reynolds, a young widow who died two and a half years later.

In 1875, he married Annie Frances Rockwell. Their son Adna R. Chaffee Jr. also became a general and was one of the fathers of the U.S. Army's armored forces, having a light tank, the M24 Chaffee, named in his honor.

After his death, Chaffee was buried with full military honors at Arlington National Cemetery on November 9, 1914, after a funeral service at St. John's Episcopal Church. After her death six and a half years later, his second wife Annie was interred beside him.

== Awards ==
- Civil War Campaign Medal
- Indian Campaign Medal
- Spanish Campaign Medal
- China Campaign Medal
- Philippine Campaign Medal

== Dates of rank ==
Insignia	Rank	Component	Date
No insignia	Private	Union Army	22 July 1861
	Sergeant	Union Army	1862
	First Sergeant	Union Army	September 1862
	Second Lieutenant	Union Army	13 March 1863
	First Lieutenant	Union Army	22 February 1865
	Captain	Regular Army	12 October 1867
	Major	Regular Army	7 July 1888
	Lieutenant Colonel	Regular Army	1 June 1897
	Brigadier General	Volunteers	4 May 1898
	Major General	Volunteers	8 July 1898
	Colonel	Regular Army	8 May 1899
	Major General	Regular Army	4 February 1901
	Lieutenant General	Regular Army	9 January 1904

== Tributes ==
A historical marker documenting Chaffee's birthplace stands in Orwell, Ohio.

The city of Chaffee, Missouri, was named in his honor when founded in 1905.

Chaffee Gate, one of the entrances to the sprawling Texas military base Fort Bliss is named in his honor.

Military offices
Preceded by Samuel B. M. Young	Chief of Staff of the United States Army; 1904–1906	Succeeded by John C. Bates
