= Yamaguchi Motomi =

Japanese general (1846–1904)

Baron Yamaguchi Motomi Senior Third Rank
- 山口 素臣
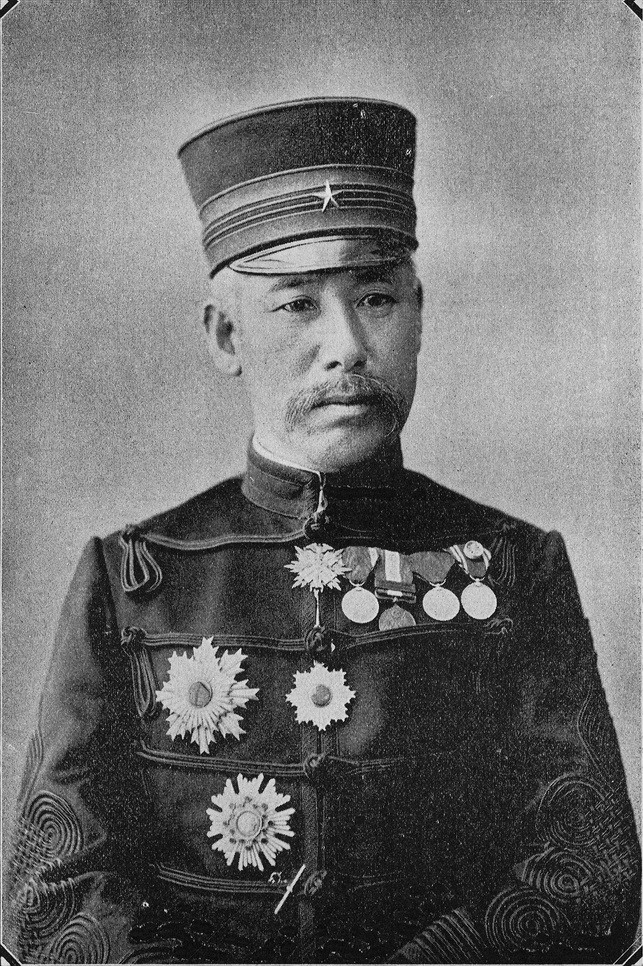
- Yamaguchi in 1899
- Born: June 8, 1846; Hagi, Nagato, Chōshū Domain, Japan
- Died: August 7, 1904 (aged 58); Tokyo, Japan
- Burial place: Aoyama Cemetery, Minato, Tokyo
- Education: Osaka Army Second Guidance Corps
- Children: Juhachi Yamaguchi
- Relatives: Yoshiyoshi Yamamoto (biological father); Yoshiyoshi Yamaguchi (adoptive father)
- Military career
- Allegiance: Chōshū Domain; Empire of Japan
- Branch: Imperial Japanese Army
- Rank: General (Rikugun-Taishō)
- Nickname: "Warlord of warlords"
- Units: Kiheitai; Kumamoto Garrison
- Commands: Konoye Infantry First Battalion; 9th Infantry Regiment; 7th Infantry Regiment; 10th Infantry Brigade; 3rd Brigade (2nd Division); 5th Division
- Conflicts: Boshin War; Saga Rebellion; Satsuma Rebellion; Battle of Tabaruzaka; First Sino-Japanese War; Battle of Weihaiwei; Boxer Rebellion; Siege of the International Legations; Gaselee Expedition; Battle of Peking
- Awards: Order of the Golden Kite; Grand Cordon of the Order of the Asahi; Order of Orange-Nassau; Order of Leopold; Order of the Double Dragon; Legion of Honor; Order of St. Anna; Order of the Iron Crown

Yamaguchi Motomi (山口 素臣, Yamaguchi Motomi; June 8, 1846 – August 7, 1904) was a Japanese samurai and Imperial Japanese Army general who participated in the First Sino-Japanese War and the Boxer Rebellion. Nicknamed the Warlord of Warlords, he was known for his extensive campaigns and service and was a recipient of the Order of the Golden Kite.

== Biography ==
Yamaguchi was born into the Chōshū Domain during the Edo Period in Hagi as the son of Yoshiyoshi Yamamoto, a samurai of the Yamaguchi domain; he was adopted by Yoshiyoshi Yamaguchi, who was a samurai of the same domain. He partook in military service during the Boshin War within the Kiheitai. After the Meiji Restoration, he served in the Imperial Japanese Army.

In September 1870, he joined the Osaka Army Second Guidance Corps and was appointed army sergeant in April 1871. During the same year, he was promoted from lieutenant to captain, and became an army major since October 1873. In January of the following year, when the First Regiment of the Konoye Infantry was established, he became the first battalion chief and participated in the Saga Rebellion. In the following Satsuma Rebellion, he participated in the Battle of Tabaruzaka on March 4. He attacked the right wing of the Satsuma army in the Toyooka and Hirahara districts (now Ueki-cho, Kita-ku, Kumamoto City), but he was attacked and wounded. The Konoye Regiment at that time was organized by two battalions, and there were four battalion chiefs in total, but all three battalion chiefs other than Yamaguchi were killed in battle.

After the war, he announced his post-war training as commander of the 9th Infantry Regiment and the Commander of the 7th Infantry Regiment before advancing to army colonel in February 1882. From March of the same year, he was appointed chief of staff of Kumamoto Garrison, chief of staff of Tokyo in May 1885, and chief of staff of Konoye in May 1886. From September 1887 to June of the following year, he visited Europe and the United States. He was then given command of the 10th Infantry Brigade on September 11, 1888. On February 6, 1889, he became the Military Parade Chief of Staff In September 1889, he succeeded Shinagawa, who died of illness on September 5, 1890, and on February 12, 1890, he became the army major general and 10th Infantry Brigade chief. Upon the outbreak of the First Sino-Japanese War, he became the 3rd Brigade Chief of the 2nd Division Subordinate Infantry.

On January 20, he landed on the Shandong Peninsula since July 25, 1894. During the War, vomiting was prevalent among soldiers who landed in the order of travel. When Yamaguchi visited the field hospital, he held a soldier's hand, stroked his back, and scolded him, "What should I do if the sickness takes my life to throw away for the nation?" He led the right-wing corps to participate in the Battle of Weihaiwei. In the early morning of January 29, prior to the battle, he stood on a small hill to observe the battle situation. At that time, a shell on the Qing side exploded nearby, and a reporter from the American Chronicle (either The San Francisco Chronicle or The Augusta Chronicle) next to him fell. When Yamaguchi pulled him up, he said in a calm tone, "I may come back later, so I should go away soon." Due to his victory and achievement in Weihaiwei, he was awarded to be a baron in August 1895 after the war, and in October 1896, he advanced to Lieutenant General of the Army and was supplemented by the 5th Division Commander.

In 1900, he was sent to participate in the Boxer Rebellion due to Japanese involvement in the conflict and was awarded the Grand Cordon of the Order of the Asahi and the Order of the Golden Kite. In March 1904, he was promoted to General of the Army and appointed the military councilor officer before his death in August of the same year. His place of burial is at Aoyama Cemetery, Minato, Tokyo.

Juhachi Yamaguchi, the adopted son who succeeded him, was attacked as a child. Juhachi later became a major general in the Army, and served as the chief of the Infantry 11th Brigade and the Chief of the 1st Brigade of the Guard Infantry.

== Court Ranks ==
- Junior Fourth Rank (February 28, 1890)
- Senior Fourth Rank (May 20, 1895)
- Junior Third Rank (June 11, 1900)
- Senior Third Rank (March 17, 1904)

=== Awards ===
- Order of the Rising Sun
- Commemorative Chapter
- Order of the Sacred Treasure, second class
- Military Medal of Honor
- Order of the Golden Kite, third class; in 1901 second class

=== Foreign Honours ===
- Austria-Hungary: Order of the Iron Crown
- Belgium: Order of Leopold
- China: Order of the Double Dragon
- France: Legion of Honour
- Netherlands: Order of Orange-Nassau
- Russia: Order of St. Anna

=== Bibliography ===
- Hata, Ikuhiko, ed. (2005). Japanese Army and Navy Encyclopedia (2nd ed.). University of Tokyo Press.
- List of years of service for the same amount of active-duty officers in the Army. July 1, 1901 10 pages.
