= Henri-Nicolas Frey =

French general

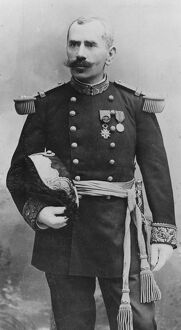
- Born: 9 January 1847; Bocognano, Corsica, Kingdom of France
- Died: 6 January 1932 (aged 84); Menton, Alpes-Maritimes, French Republic
- Military career
- Allegiance: French Empire; French Republic
- Branch: Troupes de marine
- Service years: 1866 – 1909
- Commands: 2nd Marine Infantry Regiment
- Conflicts: French Sudan Campaign; Boxer Rebellion: Siege of the International Legations; Battle of Peking
- Awards: Legion of Honour, Tonkin Expedition commemorative medal, Colonial Medal, 1901 China expedition commemorative medal

Henri-Nicolas Frey was a French major general of the Troupes coloniales. He led the French troops at the Battle of Peking in August 1900 where a multinational force ended the siege of foreign legations during the Boxer Rebellion.

== Biography ==
Henri-Nicolas Frey was born on 9 January 1847 in Bocognano in Corsica, son of Henri Frey (1808–1887) who was a gendarmerie officer, then justice of the peace in Valensole, knight of the Legion of Honor, 2nd class and his mother being Jeanne Carréga (1814–1886). He got married on 19 February 1894 in Asnières-sur-Seine with Julie Bertrand, divorced wife of Charles Apert. He died on 6 January 1932 in Menton.

=== Military career ===
Frey was a student of the Lycée Thiers and then of the Prytanée national militaire, he entered the École spéciale militaire de Saint-Cyr on 18 October 1866. He was a second lieutenant in 1868, a lieutenant in 1870, a captain in 1874 in French Senegal, and a squadron leader in 1880. He served in the Bureau of The Marine Infantry Troops and was rapporteur of the Technical Committee of the Colonies. He was then lieutenant-colonel in 1884 in Tonkin and colonel in 1887 in the colonial regiment of Brest, then in Senegal. As a young colonel in command of the 2nd Marine Infantry Regiment, he led a mission for the French Sudan Campaign in 1885–1886. He then wrote a book out of it, titled Campagne dans le Haut-Sénégal et dans le Haut-Niger (1885–1886), in 1888.

He was appointed brigadier general in 1896, and took command of the 3rd Colonial Brigade (1896–97) as the Inspector General, he under-commissioned missions to New Caledonia, Réunion and Madagascar. In 1900, he participated in the Battle of Peking with his men, mostly Vietnamese conscripts who had seen little action were in-experienced. They were hastily sent to be landed near Tianjin, arriving a day after the other legions. Then in July 1900, he took command of the French troops in China, which he commanded during the march on Beijing and the capture of the imperial city on 15 August. On the arrival of General Voyron in September 1900, he took command of the First Brigade of the Expeditionary Force. He was named Grand Officer of the Légion d'honneur by decree on 12 July 1906.

== Honors ==
- Legion of Honour, awarded on 12 July 1906
- Tonkin Expedition commemorative medal
- Colonial Medal
- 1901 China expedition commemorative medal

=== Foreign Honors ===
- Austria-Hungary: Order of the Iron Crown
- Belgium: Order of Leopold
- Cambodia: Royal Order of Cambodia
- German Empire: Order of the Red Eagle
- Netherlands: Order of Orange-Nassau
- Nguyễn dynasty: Order of the Dragon of Annam
- Russian Empire: Order of Saint Stanislaus, Order of Saint Anna
- Spain: Order of Isabella the Catholic
