= Battle of Yangcun =

1900 battle of the Boxer Rebellion

- Part of the Boxer Rebellion
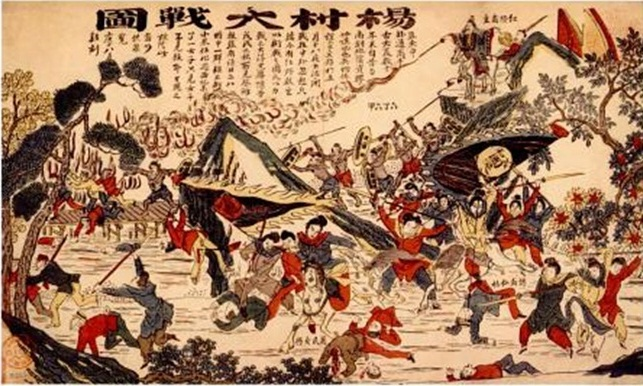
- Chinese nianhua depicting the battle
Date	August 6, 1900
Location	Yangcun, China
Result	Allied victory

Belligerents
Eight-Nation Alliance British Empire Russia Japan France Germany United States Italy Austria-Hungary	Qing dynasty

Commanders and leaders
(Russian Empire) Nikolai Linevich (United Kingdom of Great Britain and Ireland) O'Moore Creagh	(Qing dynasty) Ma Yukun (Qing dynasty) Song Qing

Strength
18,000 soldiers	10,000 soldiers

Casualties and losses
(United States) 9 KIA, 15 DOW, 39 wounded, 2 dead by sunstroke (United Kingdom of Great Britain and Ireland) 6 KIA, 38 wounded, 1 dead by sunstroke (Russian Empire) 7 KIA, 20 wounded Total: 40 dead, 122 wounded	Minor

The Battle of Yangcun was a battle during the march of Eight-Nation Alliance forces from Tianjin to Beijing during the Boxer Rebellion. The Alliance forces defeated the Qing and were able to continue their march towards Peking.

== Background ==
On August 4, 1900, the soldiers of the Eight-Nation Alliance left the city of Tianjin to march to Beijing to relieve the Siege of the Legations. The army consisted of approximately 20,000 troops from the following countries: United States, 2,000; Japan, 10,000; Russia, 4,000; Britain, 3,000; France, 800; Germany, 200; Austria and Italy, 100.

The Alliance defeated the Chinese army at Beicang on August 5. The Chinese retreated approximately 12 miles to Yangcun, where they took up prepared positions between the east bank of the Hai River and a railroad embankment. Yangcun was the strongpoint at which the Chinese army hoped to stop the advance of the Alliance army. The country was flat, with little cover for the attackers except for fields of millet and corn, and the 30-foot-high railroad embankment gave shelter to the Chinese forces.

The Americans and British were in the forefront of the Alliance column advancing on Yangcun on August 6. The Japanese remained on the west side of the Hai River and would not be part of the battle. The Chinese probably numbered about 10,000, although it is unknown how many were on the battlefield itself.

A serious problem for Alliance troops was the tremendous heat. About 20% of the men fell out of the ranks during the march to Yangcun and several deaths from sunstroke were recorded. Many more men would be incapacitated by the heat during the battle.

== The battle ==
The Alliance deployed about 5,000 yards from the Chinese positions. Its battle line stretching east from the river consisted of the Russians first, next the British, then the Americans 14th Infantry, and on the right flank the 9th Infantry supported by U.S. Marines. The British Bengal Lancers anchored the right flank.

The attack began at 11:00 a.m., but what transpired was more of an endurance contest than a battle. Most of the men had already exhausted the water in their canteens. "There were no wells nor streams of water in the country over which the advance was made. The men were famishing of thirst. They fell by scores with heat exhaustion".

The Americans bore the brunt of the Chinese resistance as they advanced on the strongest Chinese positions behind the railroad embankment. "The plain in front of us was a furnace. Dust rose in thick clouds". Men collapsed of sunstroke and heat exhaustion. Chinese artillery and rifle fire became "moderately severe" and the Americans, now in open country with no cover, advanced in a rush to dislodge the Chinese. However, as they charged over the embankment they found most of the Chinese positions abandoned. The remainder of the battle consisted of rear-guard actions as the Chinese covered their retreat.

The American advance had been so rapid that the British (or possibly the Russian) artillery mistook the Americans for the retreating Chinese and lobbed shells into the 14th Infantry, killing four American soldiers and wounding 11. The Americans frantically sent out messengers to signal the British and Russians to stop the shelling. In addition, American forces were also fired upon by French forces during the battle.

The Battle of Yangcun was over by late afternoon, with the victorious but exhausted Alliance soldiers in control of the battlefield. The Chinese army had escaped with few casualties, abandoning strong positions as the Alliance troops advanced. American casualties were 9 dead and 64 wounded, but 15 of the wounded would soon die. In addition, two American soldiers died of sunstroke. The British had six dead and 38 wounded and one dead of sunstroke. The Russians had seven killed and 20 wounded.

== Aftermath ==
The Alliance had defeated the Chinese at both Beicang and Yangcun. Although still intact and barely weakened, the Chinese army did not challenge the Alliance again, and the Alliance troops continued their march, mostly unopposed, to Beijing. On August 14 they forced their way into the city, raised the Siege of the Legations and occupied the city and the surrounding countryside, wiping out the last vestiges of the Boxer movement.

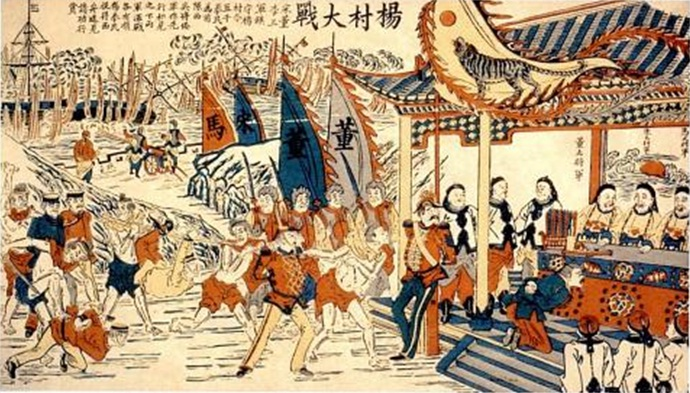
Chinese nianhua depicting an alleged scene of captured Eight Nation Alliance officers being dragged before Gen. Dong Fuxiang. However, his forces did not participate in this battle; it was primarily the troops of Gen. Song and Gen. Ma. Dong actually led the forces at the Battle of Langfang. It appears as if the scene may have referred to a different battle.

== Legacy ==
Dr. Sun Yat-sen, the founding father of the Republic of China and of the Kuomintang party praised the Boxers for fighting against Western Imperialism. He said the Boxers were courageous and fearless, fighting to the death against the Western armies, Dr. Sun specifically cited the Battle of Yangcun, although apparently referring to a battle earlier in the Boxer Rebellion between the Boxers and the army of the Seymour Expedition.
