= Ma Yukun =

20th-century Chinese general

- 馬玉崑
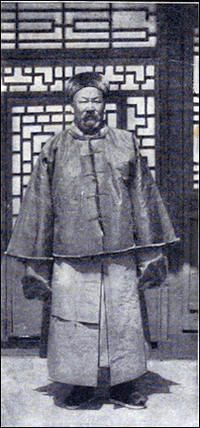
- Photograph of Ma published in 1901
- Born: 1838; Maji, Anhui, China
- Died: 1908 (aged 70); Peking, China
- Military career
- Branch: Imperial Chinese Army
- Service years: 1864–1901
- Nickname: Zhenyong Baturu
- Commands: Huai Army; Resolute Army
- Conflicts: Nian Rebellion; Qing reconquest of Xinjiang; First Sino-Japanese War: Battle of Pyongyang; Battle of Jiuliancheng; Battle of Lüshunkou; Boxer Rebellion: Battle of Tientsin; Battle of Beicang

Ma Yukun, courtesy name Jingshan (景山) was a Chinese army general who primarily served the Huai Army and the Resolute Army; he served during the First Sino-Japanese War and the Boxer Rebellion.

== Biography ==
=== Early years ===
Ma was born in 1838, at Maji, Anhui, Mengcheng County. His family was poor and were primarily an agricultural one; however, Ma was a martial artist and became a well-known local trainer.

Due to his martial arts skills, Song Qing found an appreciation for him and personally enlisted him to attack the Nian Army during the Nian Rebellion, and accumulated meritorious work to the capital, giving him the title of Zhenyong Baturu.

In 1874, Ma Yukun and Zuo Zongtang's department jointly fought against the aggression of Agubo and the Russian Empire in the Qing reconquest of Xinjiang, and then led the army to garrison the northwest for more than 10 years. During the Guangxu period, he was transferred to Zhili. In 1894, he was awarded the commander-in-chief of Taiyuan Town, Shanxi, to assist Song Qing in garrisoning the Beiyang Naval Base in Lushunkou before the First Sino-Japanese War broke out.

=== First Sino-Japanese War ===
During the war, he would command 6 garrisons of the Yi Army to Northern Korea to guard the east bank of the Taedong River outside the South Gate of Pyongyang. In the early morning of the 15th, there was a fierce battle with the Japanese ninth brigade. Because of Ma's strict defense and good command, he wiped out nearly 3 Japanese squadrons, killing 140 Japanese soldiers and wounded more than 290 soldiers, and secured Pyongyang South Road despite the later Chinese defeat at the battle. After the fall of Pyongyang, he led his army back to China and assisted Song Qing in defending the Yalu River defense line. On October 24, the Battle of Jiuliancheng broke out and led his own men to assist Qing to resist the Japanese. After yet another defeat, Yukun participated at the Battle of Lüshunkou, defending the west hill of Longwang Temple as the two sides fought until 2 PM that afternoon when the Japanese sent reinforcements. When Hei Tian could no longer fight, Ma pulled back temporarily returned to the camp at Shilibao. Ma then launched a counterattack which managed to kill 50 Japanese but because his army was fatigued and he did not bring artillery, Chinese casualties during the battle were high and almost all of Ma's officers were killed during the battle.

On February 24, 1895, during the Japanese offensive on Haicheng, Ma Yukun led his troops to defend villages such as Qiligou in Beishan, climbing the ice and laying by the snow, overseeing the battle. The Japanese attacked from three sides and set up dozens of cannons to continuously bombard the Qing army. After a day of fierce fighting, the Qing army had no backup, ran out of ammunition and food, and fell into a heavy siege. Song Qing ordered a breakout. Ma Yukun broke through the siege and found that Song Qing was still surrounded, and then rushed into the enemy's encirclement to reinforce Song's army. Song's three horses were all killed by artillery shells as Ma Yukun led his subordinates to break through the siege many times, changing mounts three times, killing more than 300 Japanese soldiers and wounding more than a thousand soldiers. Later, he moved to Yingkou, Tianzhuangtai and other places with Song Qing. Because of his bravery in battles and his repeated achievements, the Japanese army feared him.

In 1899, he was promoted to Admiral of Zhejiang Fleet. During the Boxer Rebellion, the Eight Nation Alliance and others invaded, Ma Yukun lead the Resoloute Army to resist. The two armies fought in Tianjin and Beicang. They held a stalemate for more than a month, and Ma Yukun finally retired due to isolation and helplessness. By the next year, he would return to Peking and died in there in 1908 from illness.
