= Battle of Beicang =

1900 battle of the Boxer Rebellion

- Part of the Boxer Rebellion
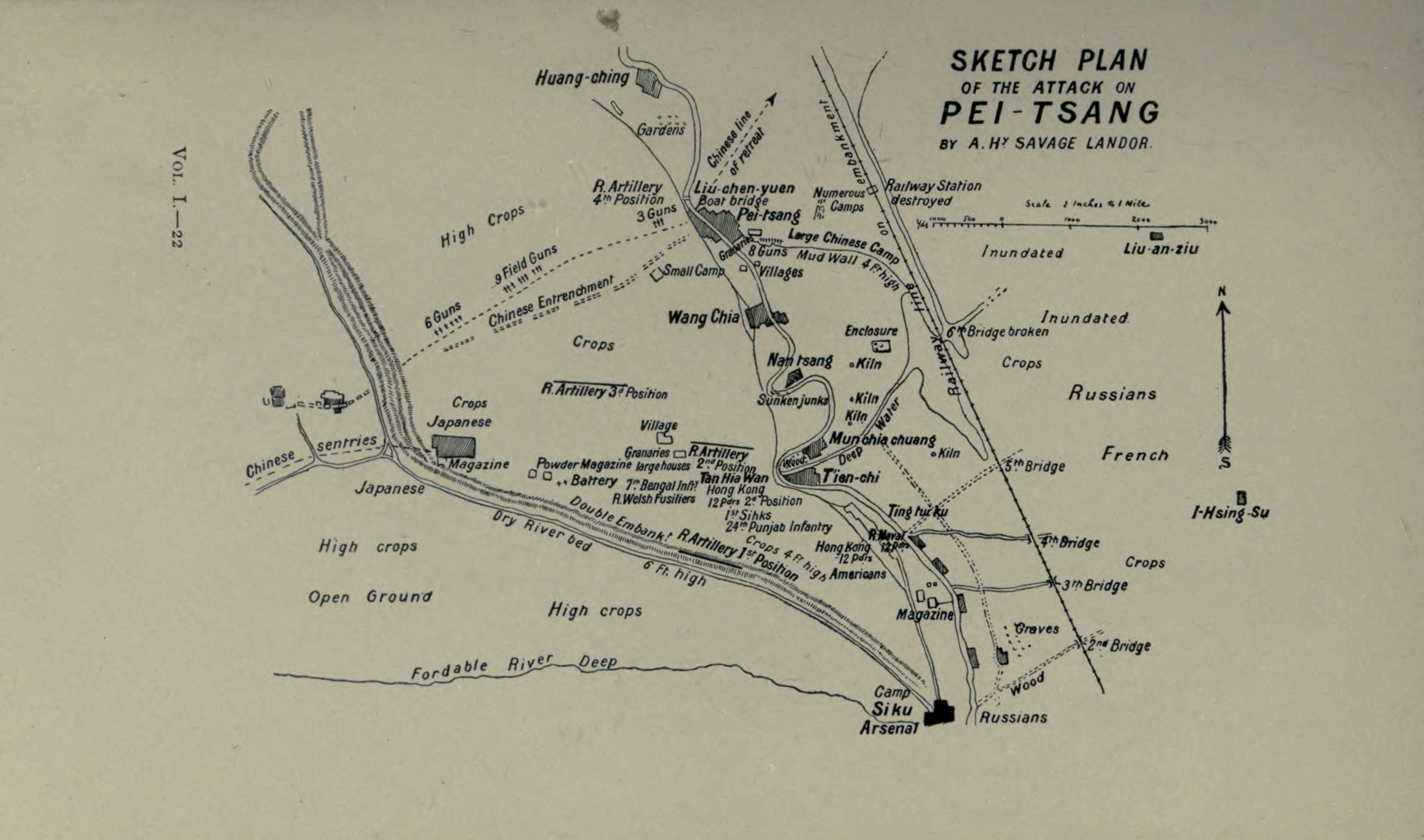
- Sketch map of the battle
Date	5 August 1900
Location	Beicang, China
Result	Allied victory

Belligerents
Eight-Nation Alliance; Japan; British Empire; United States; France; Russian Empire	China

Commanders and leaders
(Empire of Japan) Yamaguchi Motomi (Russian Empire) Nikolai Linevich (United Kingdom of Great Britain and Ireland) Alfred Gaselee (United States) Adna Chaffee	(Qing dynasty) Dong Fuxiang (Qing dynasty) Ronglu

Strength
20,000	8,000 – 11,000

Casualties and losses
61 killed, 271 wounded: (Empire of Japan) 60 killed, 240 wounded; (United Kingdom of Great Britain and Ireland) 1 killed, 25 wounded; (Russian Empire) 6 wounded	~50 killed

The Battle of Beicang (Chinese: 北倉之戰), also rendered as the Battle of Peitsang, was fought August 5, 1900 during the Boxer Rebellion, between the Eight Nation Alliance and the Chinese Qing dynasty army. The Chinese army was forced out of its prepared entrenchments and retreated to Yangcun. The Japanese contingent led the Alliance attack; with contingents also being present from Russia, Britain, America and France.

== Background ==
The Boxer Rebellion was an anti-imperialist, anti-foreign, and anti-Christian uprising in China in 1899. The immediate background of the uprising included severe drought and disruption by the growth of foreign spheres of influence after the Sino-Japanese War of 1895. After several months of growing violence and murder in Shandong and the North China Plain against foreign and Christian presence in June 1900, Boxer fighters, convinced they were invulnerable to foreign weapons, converged on Beijing with the slogan "Support the Qing government and exterminate the foreigners". The Chinese Empress Dowager Cixi supported the Boxers and on June 21 issued an Imperial Decree declaring war on the foreign powers. Diplomats, foreign civilians, soldiers and Chinese Christians sought refuge in the Legation Quarter where they were besieged.

On August 4, 1900, the soldiers of the Eight Nation Alliance left the city of Tianjin to march towards Beijing in order to relieve the siege. The force consisted of approximately 20,000 troops, with contingents from: Japan, 10,000; Russia, 4,000; Great Britain, 3,000; United States, 2,000; France, 800; Germany, 200; and Austria and Italy, 100. Reconnaissance indicated that the Chinese forces were entrenched at Beicang, six miles from Tianjin, on both sides of the Hai River. The Americans, British and Japanese advanced on the west side of the river and the Russians and French on the east. The armies bivouacked the night of August 4/5 near Xigu Fort. The Alliance plan was for the Japanese, supported by the British and Americans, to turn the right flank of the Chinese lines and for the Russians and French to turn the left flank on the opposite side of the Hay River. The Chinese force, estimated at between 8,000 and 12,000, was positioned behind several lines of well-constructed earthworks with approximately 26 artillery pieces at key positions. It was, according to contemporary accounts, "a formidable position to attack".

== Battle ==
At 3:00 a.m. the Japanese launched the attack by capturing an artillery battery on the extreme right of the Chinese lines. They then pushed forward on the flank of the Chinese positions. At dawn an artillery duel began between the Japanese and Chinese that lasted about a half-hour. During the artillery barrage a Japanese regiment crept forward and launched a direct assault on the Chinese positions near the river, advancing in close order through fields of millet and corn with a barrage of fire from the Chinese trenches pouring onto them. The Japanese had requested assistance from British cavalry for the assault but this failed to arrive, so the Japanese pushed ahead alone. The Japanese suffered heavy casualties but forced the Chinese out of their entrenchments and into a hasty retreat.

On the east bank of the Hai River the Russians and French were unable to get around the Chinese flank due to flooded terrain. However, the Japanese victory on the west bank forced the Chinese to retreat, which they did in good order. The Chinese preserved most of their artillery by withdrawing it early in the battle, an action that, according to a United States War Department report, "must have predisposed the rest of their army to its prompt retreat".

About 50 Chinese were killed in the battle. Almost all the Alliance casualties were Japanese, amounting to 60 dead and 240 wounded. A few British and Russian casualties were caused by Chinese artillery fire. The Americans were never engaged, not finding their way to the battlefield until the action was over. American medics treated the Japanese casualties.

== Aftermath ==
The battle was over by 9:00 a.m. Pursuit of the Chinese army was hindered by the Chinese cutting through the river banks to flood the surrounding lowlands. The Alliance army bivouacked at Beicang and its supply train from Tianjin came up during the day. The first battle during the march to Beijing had been a relatively easy victory, albeit costly in casualties for the Japanese. The Chinese now awaited the Alliance in strong defensive positions at Yangcun.

The assessment of one participant at the Battle of Beicang was that the "Chinese troops received a blow from which they never recovered. They ever after offered no determined resistance".
