= Wu Dacheng =

Chinese politician in the 19th century

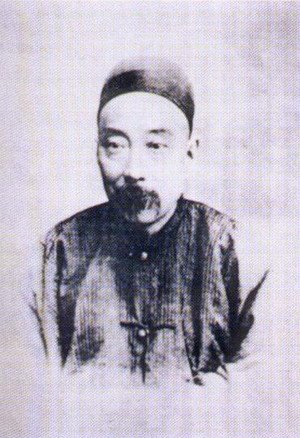
Wu Dacheng

Wu Dacheng (1835–1902) was a Chinese politician, governor, author, artist, and collector during the Qing dynasty.

== Life ==
Wu grew up in a scholarly home. While living in Suzhou, he succeeded the imperial examination. In the next two decades, he had many jobs and positions. One of the positions included being a Qing officer.

=== Governor of Hunan ===
Dacheng was the governor of Hunan until 1895, when he failed to defend Liaoning from the Japanese forces during the First Sino-Japanese War.

== Artworks ==
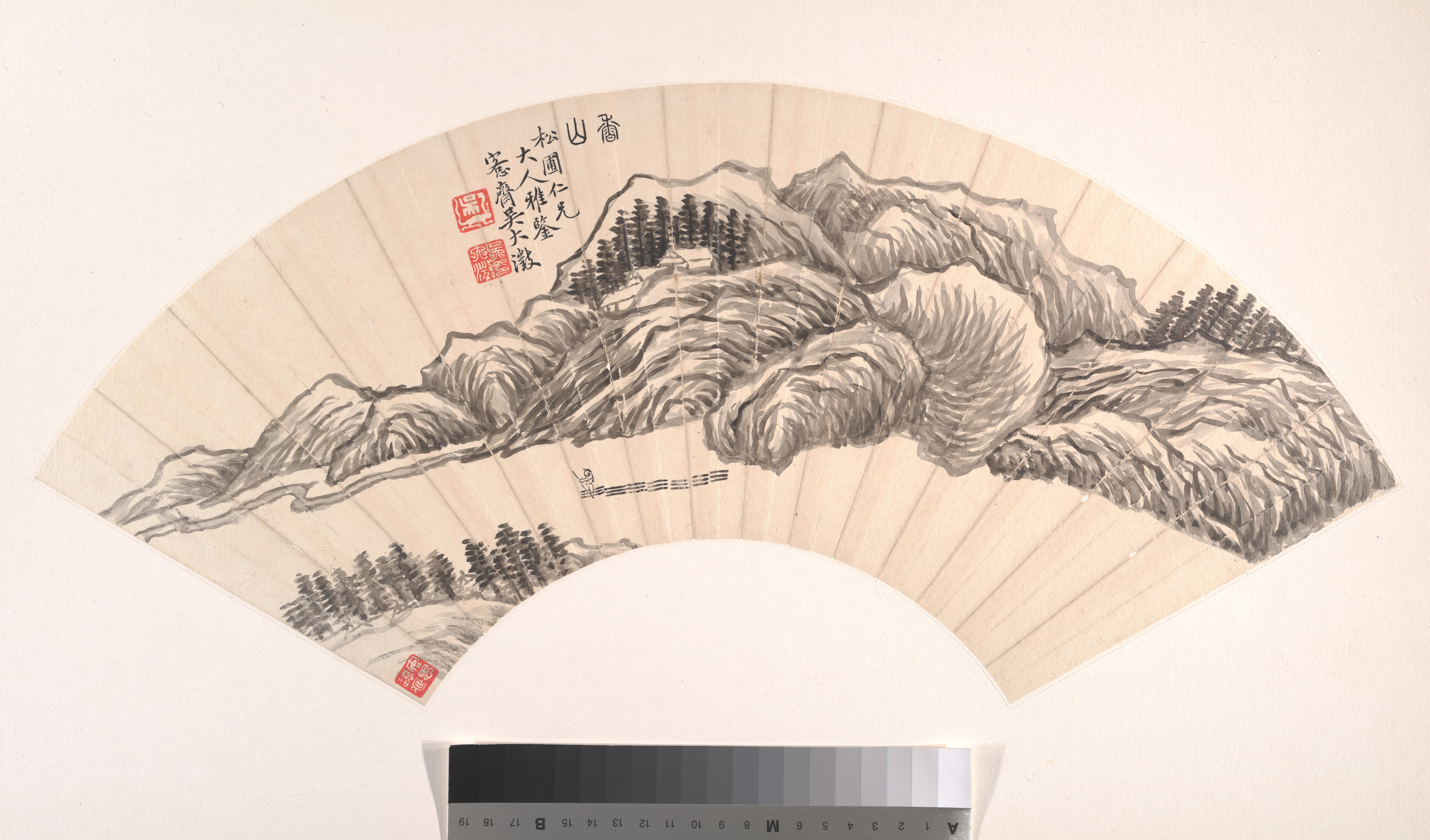
Fragrant Mountains by Wu Dacheng.

Wu has painted many paintings during his lifetime, including "Fragrant Mountains" and "Mountain and Stream and Rain". He has made 37 jades, which are held in the Suzhou museum. Other works of art created by him include coins, seals, porcelains, paintings scrolls, and hand fans.

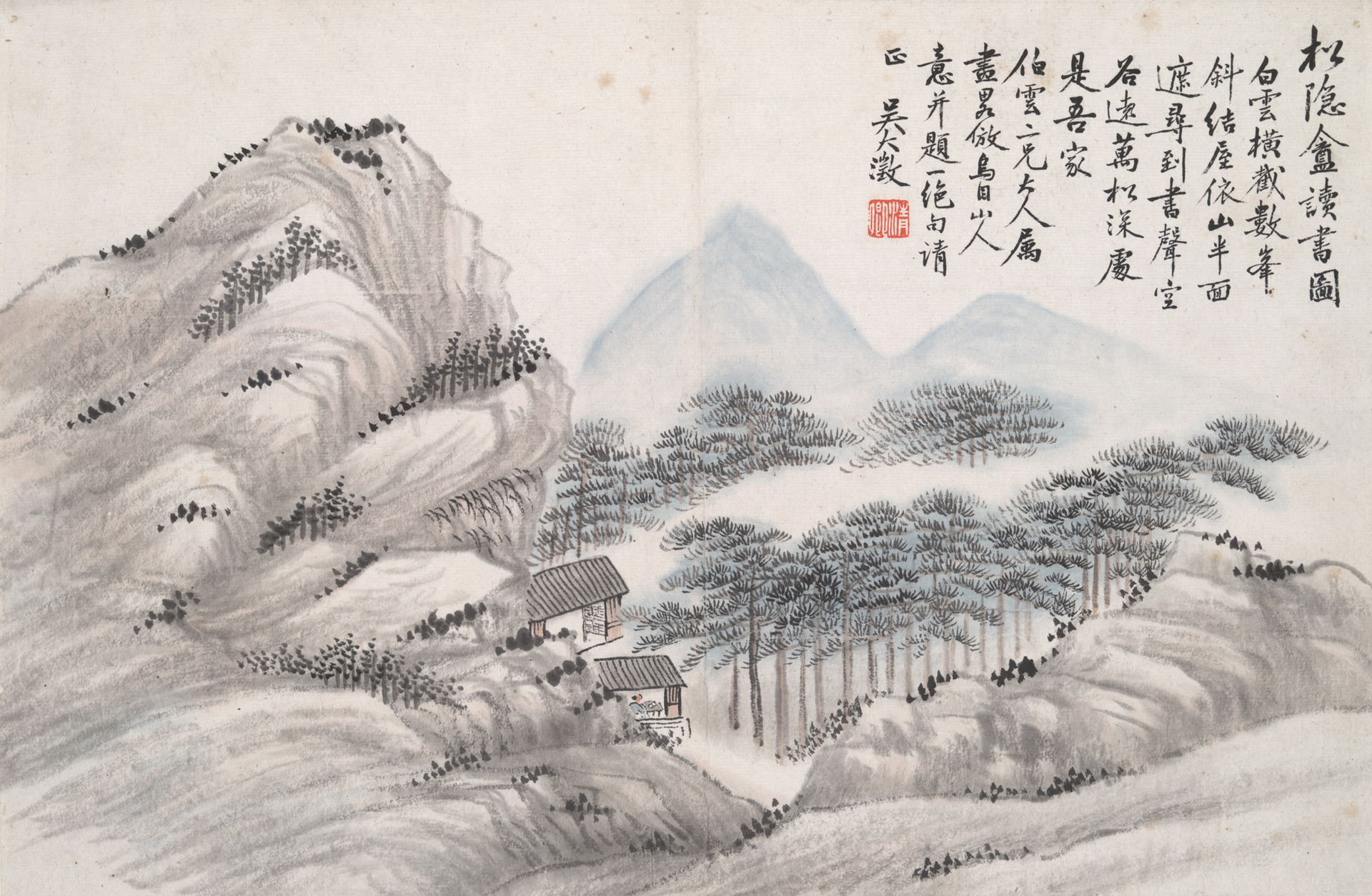
Reading at the Secluded Pine Studio (Song yin an)
