= Song Qing (Qing dynasty) =

Chinese general

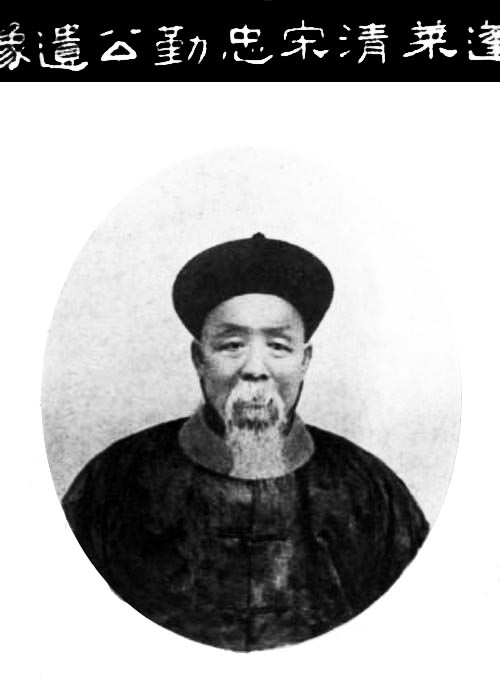
- Photograph of Song Qing
- Born: 1820; Shandong Province, Qing China
- Died: 1902 (aged 81–82); Beijing, Qing China
- Military career
- Allegiance: Qing dynasty
- Service years: 1860s–1902
- Rank: General
- Unit: Huai Army
- Commands: Left Division of Wuwei Corps
- Conflicts: First Sino-Japanese War; Boxer Rebellion

Song Qing (simplified Chinese: 宋庆; traditional Chinese: 宋慶; pinyin: Sòng Qìng; Wade–Giles: Sung Ch'ing) (1820–1902), courtesy name Zhusan, was a Chinese general who served the Imperial government during the First Sino-Japanese War and in the Boxer Rebellion.

Song was a native of what is now Penglai City, Shandong Province. Passing his imperial examinations for bureaucratic positions, he was assigned as a magistrate to what is now Bozhou in Anhui Province. During the Nien Rebellion, he led a local army against the rebels in southern Henan Province and northern Anhui Province. In 1862, he was promoted to general, and awarded the title of Baturu. He later joined his forces to that of the Huai Army, and assisted Sengge Rinchen in the suppression of the Taiping Rebellion, and subsequently (in 1869) fought in the Dungan revolt under the command of Zuo Zongtang.

From 1880, Song worked under Li Hongzhang towards overseeing the defence of Manchuria against the Russian Empire, and from 1882 had been stationed in strategic port of Lushunkou, home of the Beiyang Fleet, but did little in the decade that he was there to either strengthen its defenses or improve on the training of his men. After the Qing defeat at the Battle of Pyongyang in the First Sino-Japanese War, Li Hongzhang appointed Song as his deputy commander and assigned him the responsibility for defending the crossing of the Yalu River. However, the appointment was unpopular with his troops, who equated his lethargic attitude with cowardice, and who deserted in large numbers before and during the Battle of Jiuliancheng. Afterwards, Song assisted Viceroy Liu Kunyi at the equally disastrous Battle of Yingkou.

After the war, in 1898, Song was assigned to the garrison of Jinzhou in Liaoning Province. He participated in the Boxer Rebellion of 1900, fighting the Allied army at the Battle of Yangcun. He died of illness in Beijing in 1902.
