= Battle of Jiuliancheng =

First Sino-Japanese War battle

Coordinates: 40°10′18″N 124°26′53″E

- Part of the First Sino-Japanese War
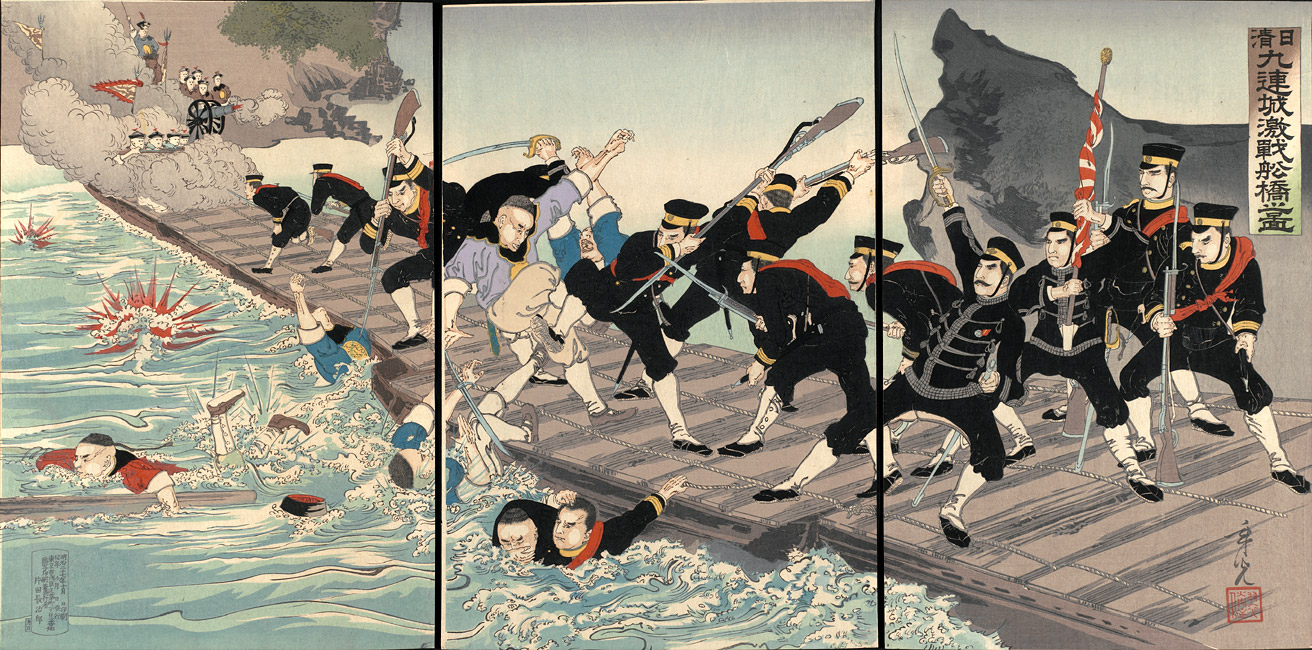
- The Fierce Battle on the Floating Bridge at Jiulingcheng, Fukushima Toshimitsu
Date	24 October 1894
Location	Yalu River, China–Korea border
Result	Japanese victory

Belligerents
Japan	China

Commanders and leaders
Yamagata Aritomo	Song Qing

Strength
20,000	13,000

Casualties and losses
34 killed 111 wounded	500
- Figures for Qing strength and casualties come from Piotr Olender, 335-336.

The Battle of Jiuliancheng (九連城之戰) was a land battle of the First Sino-Japanese War between the forces of Meiji Japan and Qing China. It is sometimes referred to as the Battle of the Yalu River (鴨緑江作戦, Ōryokuko Saksuken), thus creating confusion with the previous naval conflict of the same name of 17 September, and the subsequent naval and ground battles of the Russo-Japanese War, with the same name and occurring at much the same location.

== Background ==
After their defeat at the Battle of Pyongyang, the Beiyang Army made its next stand at the crossing of the Yalu River, the border between Korea and China. On the Chinese side, Qing general Song Qing established his headquarters at the walled town of Jiuliancheng (九連城), and fortified the banks of the Yalu River south to the local district capital of Dandong and north to the village of Hushan (虎山) for about 16 kilometers in either direction with over a hundred redoubts and trenches manned by around 13,000 troops.

On the Korean side of the Yalu River, Japanese general Yamagata Aritomo occupied the walled town of Uiju on 23 October 1894 with approximately 20,000 troops of the Japanese First Army, consisting of the 3rd and 5th Divisions. Although Yamagata and the main Japanese force did not arrive until 23 October, Japanese scouts and engineers had been present since early that month, surveying the river and laying a telegraph line to Pyongyang.

== The battle ==
Yamagata's strategy was to feint a frontal assault on the main Beiyang Army positions at Jiuliancheng, while his main forces turned the Chinese flank at Hushan. During the night of 24 October, the Japanese succeeded in placing a pontoon bridge over the Yalu River undetected, immediately in front of the Chinese fortifications. The IJA 3rd Division under General Katsura Tarō staged a night attack on Hushan on 25 October 1894, only to discover that the bulk of the Chinese garrison had deserted their fortifications the night before. Likewise, the IJA 5th Division under General Nozu Michitsura, upon crossing to Jiuliancheng, found positions deserted, with only a rear guard making a token resistance. After less than three hours, the fortifications of both Jiuliancheng and Hushan were in Japanese hands.

Likewise, Dadong was occupied the following day without resistance, with the Beiyang Army leaving behind large quantities of weapons and supplies.

== Aftermath ==
A provisional Japanese civilian administration led by Baron Komura Jutarō (and later succeeded by Lieutenant General Fukushima Yasumasa) was established in the areas of the Liaodong Peninsula which came under Japanese control.

The Japanese First Army was divided into two groups. One group, commanded by Lieutenant General Katsura Tarō pursued the fleeing Antung garrison (which included General Nie Shicheng) north to Fenghaungcheng, which fell to the Japanese on 30 October, and to Xiuyan to the west of Fenghaungcheng, which was captured on 15 November. This served to isolate the land approaches to the strategic port of Lüshunkou (Port Arthur).

The second group under Lieutenant General Oku Yasukata marched north under severe winter conditions to threaten the centre of Fengtian Prefecture, Mukden. General Song and the garrison of Jiuliancheng occupied Liaoyang on the road to Mukden to block the Japanese advance, and both armies went into winter quarters.
