= First Sino-Japanese War =

1894–1895 war between China and Japan

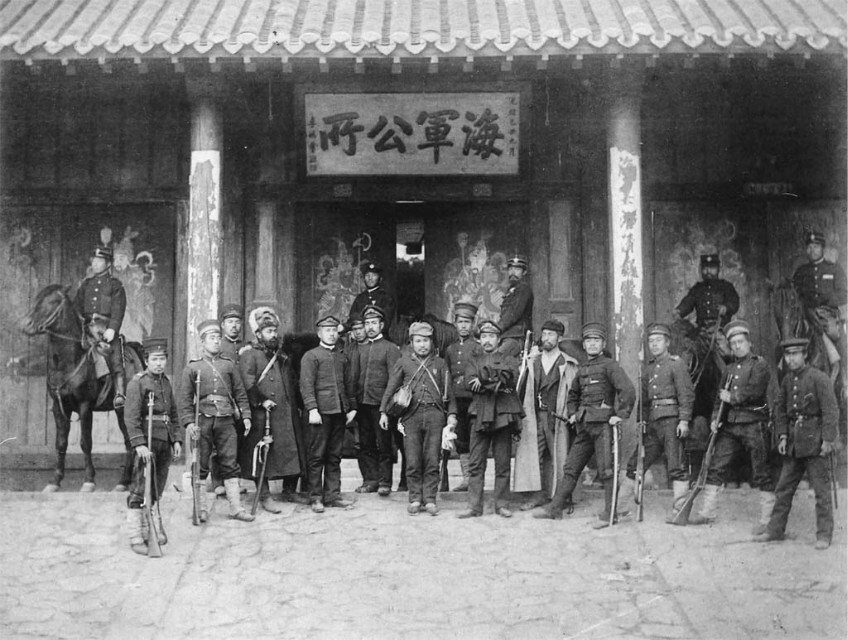
- Japanese before the office of Beiyang Fleet after taking Lüshun
Date	25 July 1894 – 17 April 1895 (8 months and 23 days)
Location	Northeast China; Shandong Peninsula; Korea; Yellow Sea
Result	Japanese victory
Territorial changes	Qing lost suzerainty over Korea, ceded Taiwan and the Penghu Islands to Japan; Liaodong Peninsula ceded to Japan, but returned by the Triple Intervention

Belligerents
Qing dynasty	Empire of Japan

Commanders and leaders
Guangxu Emperor; Empress Dowager Cixi; Li Hongzhang; Liu Kunyi; Song Qing; Zuo Baogui †; Ye Zhichao; Yuan Shikai; Ding Ruchang ‡‡	Emperor Meiji; Itō Hirobumi; Yamagata Aritomo; Nozu Michitsura; Ōyama Iwao; Katsura Tarō; Itō Sukeyuki; Kabayama Sukenori; Tōgō Heihachirō

Strength
357,100 total: 180,310 bannermen; 125,030 trained men; 51,760 Green Standard	240,616 total

Casualties and losses
35,000 killed or wounded	Total: 17,069; 1,132 killed; 3,758 wounded; 285 died of wounds; 11,894 died of disease

First Sino-Japanese War

Chinese name
- Traditional Chinese: 甲午戰爭
- Simplified Chinese: 甲午战争
- Literal meaning: Jiawu (Note: referring to the year 1894 under the traditional sexagenary system) war
Transcriptions
Standard Mandarin
- Hanyu Pinyin: Jiǎwǔ Zhànzhēng
- Bopomofo: ㄐㄧㄚˇ ㄨˇ ㄓㄢˋ ㄓㄥ
- Wade–Giles: Chia^{3}-wu^{3} Chan^{4}-cheng^{1}
- Tongyong Pinyin: Jiǎ-wǔ Jhàn-jheng
- IPA: [tɕjà.ù ʈʂân.ʈʂə́ŋ]

Japanese name
- Kyūjitai: 日淸戰爭
- Shinjitai: 日清戦争
- Literal meaning: Japan–Qing war
Transcriptions
- Romanization: Nisshin sensō
- Kunrei-shiki: Nissin sensou

Korean name
- Hangul: 청일전쟁
- Hanja: 淸日戰爭
- Literal meaning: Qing–Japan war
Transcriptions
- Revised Romanization: cheongil jeonjaeng
- McCune–Reischauer: ch'ŏngil chŏnjaeng

The First Sino-Japanese War (25 July 1894 – 17 April 1895) was a conflict between the Qing dynasty of China and the Empire of Japan primarily for influence over Korea. In China it is commonly known as the Jiawu War. (Note: (traditional Chinese: 甲午戰爭; simplified Chinese: 甲午战争; pinyin: Jiǎwǔ Zhànzhēng)) After roughly 7 months of sustained military gains by Japanese land and naval forces and the loss of the ports of Lüshunkou (Port Arthur) and Weihaiwei, the Qing government sued for peace in February 1895 and signed the Treaty of Shimonoseki two months later, ending the war.

In the late 19th century, Korea remained one of the Qing tributary states, while Japan viewed it as a target of imperial expansion. In June 1894, the Qing government, at the request of the Korean emperor Gojong, sent 2,700 to 2,800 troops to aid in suppressing the Tonghak Peasant Revolution. The Japanese considered this a violation of the 1885 Convention of Tientsin, which required each side to notify the other of military action near Korea, consequently sending an expeditionary force of 8,000 troops, which landed at Incheon. This army moved to Seoul, seized the Korean emperor, and set up a pro-Japanese government on 23 July 1894 in the occupation of Gyeongbokgung. The Qing government decided to withdraw its troops, but rejected recognition of the pro-Japanese government, which had granted the Imperial Japanese Army the right to expel the Qing's Huai Army from Korea. About 3,000 Qing troops still remained in Korea, and could be supplied only by sea; on 25 July, the Japanese Navy won the Battle of Pungdo and sank the steamer Kowshing, which was carrying 1,200 Qing reinforcements. A declaration of war followed on 1 August.

Following the Battle of Pyongyang on 15 September, Qing troops retreated to Manchuria, allowing the Japanese to take over Korea. Two days later, the Beiyang Fleet suffered a decisive defeat at the Battle of the Yalu River, with its surviving ships retreating to Port Arthur. In October 1894, the Japanese Army invaded Manchuria, and captured Port Arthur on 21 November. Japan next captured Weihaiwei on the Shandong Peninsula on 12 February 1895. This gave them control over the approaches to Beijing, and the Qing court began negotiations with Japan in early March. The war concluded with the Treaty of Shimonoseki on 17 April, which required the Qing to pay a massive indemnity and to cede the island of Taiwan to Japan. Japan also gained a predominant position in Korea.

The war demonstrated the failure of the Qing dynasty's attempts to modernise its military and fend off threats to its sovereignty, especially when compared with Japan's successful Meiji Restoration. For the first time, regional dominance in East Asia shifted from China to Japan; the prestige of the Qing dynasty, along with the classical tradition in China, suffered a major blow. Within China, the defeat was a catalyst for a series of political upheavals led by Sun Yat-sen and Kang Youwei, culminating in the 1911 Revolution and ultimate end of dynastic rule in China.

== Names ==
The war is commonly known in China as the War of Jiawu (Chinese: 甲午戰爭; pinyin: Jiǎwǔ Zhànzhēng), referring to the year 1894, which the 20th year under Guangxu Emperor's reign (Chinese: 光緒二十年) as named under the traditional sexagenary system of years. In Japan, it is called the Japan–Qing War (Japanese: 日清戦争, Hepburn: Nisshin sensō). In Korea, where much of the war took place, it is called the Qing–Japan War (Korean: 청일전쟁; Hanja: 淸日戰爭).

In the Western World, it is called the First Sino-Japanese War, as opposed to the Second Sino-Japanese War, which took place from 1931 to 1945.

== Background ==
After two centuries, the Japanese policy of seclusion under the shōguns of the Edo period came to an end when the country was opened to trade by the Convention of Kanagawa in 1854. In the years following the Meiji Restoration of 1868 and the fall of the Tokugawa shogunate, the newly formed Meiji government embarked on reforms to centralise and modernise Japan. The Japanese had sent delegations and students around the world to learn and assimilate Western arts and sciences, with the intention of making Japan an equal to the Western powers. These reforms transformed Japan from a feudal society into a modern industrial state. The Meiji government focused on strengthening the military, adopting Western-style training and technology, which led to the establishing of a powerful navy and a well-equipped army. Furthermore, Japan's economic infrastructure saw significant improvements, including the development of railways, telegraph lines, and modern factories, which led to rapid industrial growth and enhanced the country's military capabilities.

During the same period, the Qing dynasty also attempted to implement reforms in response to internal rebellions and external threats. The Self-Strengthening Movement (1861–1895) aimed to modernise the Qing's military and industry by adopting Western technology and military techniques. However, the movement faced significant challenges, including bureaucratic resistance, corruption, and a lack of central coordination. These difficulties affected the efficaciousness of the reforms and prevented China from achieving the same level of modernisation and industrialisation as Japan. As a result, by the time of the First Sino-Japanese War, China remained a largely agrarian society with a relatively weak military, unable to match the rapidly modernising Japanese forces.

=== Korean politics ===
In January 1864, King Cheoljong died without a male heir, and through Korean succession protocols King Gojong ascended the throne at the age of 12. However, as King Gojong was too young to rule, the new king's father, Yi Ha-ŭng, became the Daewongun, or lord of the great court, and ruled Korea in his son's name as regent. Originally the term Daewongun referred to any person who was not actually the king but whose son took the throne. With his ascendancy to power the Daewongun initiated a set of reforms designed to strengthen the monarchy at the expense of the Yangban class. He also pursued an isolationist policy and was determined to purge the kingdom of any foreign ideas that had infiltrated into the nation. In Korean history, the king's in-laws enjoyed great power, consequently the Daewongun acknowledged that any future daughters-in-law might threaten his authority. Therefore, he attempted to prevent any possible threat to his rule by selecting as a new queen for his son an orphaned girl from among the Yŏhŭng Min clan, which lacked powerful political connections. With Queen Min as his daughter-in-law and the royal consort, the Daewongun felt secure in his power. However, after she had become queen, Min recruited all her relatives and had them appointed to influential positions in the name of the king. The Queen also allied herself with political enemies of the Daewongun, so that by late 1873 she had mobilised enough influence to oust him from power. In October 1873, when the Confucian scholar Choe Ik-hyeon submitted a memorial to King Gojong urging him to rule in his own right, Queen Min seized the opportunity to force her father-in-law's retirement as regent. The departure of the Daewongun led to Korea's abandonment of its isolationist policy.

=== Opening of Korea ===
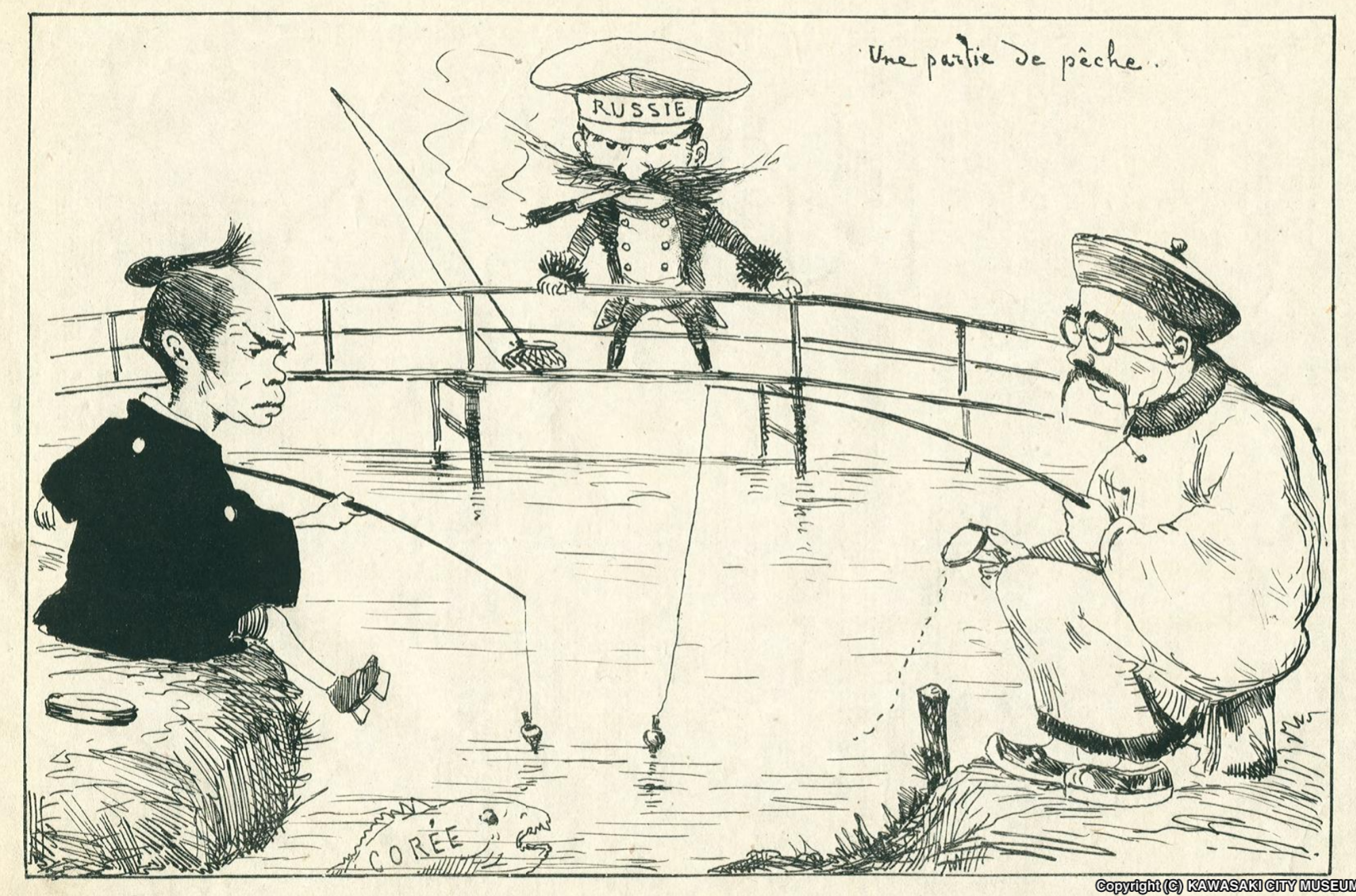
Caricature about the dispute between China, Japan and Russia over Korea, published in the first edition of Tôbaé, 1887

On 26 February 1876, after Japanese troops attacked Korean forces in the Ganghwa Island incident, the Japan–Korea Treaty of 1876 was signed, opening Korea to Japanese trade. In 1880, the King sent a mission to Japan that was headed by Kim Hong-jip, an enthusiastic observer of the reforms taking place there. While in Japan, the Chinese diplomat Huang Zunxian presented him with a study called "A Strategy for Korea" (Chinese: 朝鮮策略; pinyin: Cháoxiǎn cèlüè). It warned of the threat to Korea posed by the Russians and recommended that Korea maintain friendly relations with Japan, which was at the time too economically weak to be an immediate threat, to work closely with the Qing government, and seek an alliance with the United States as a counterweight to Russia. After returning to Korea, Kim presented the document to King Gojong, who was so impressed with the document that he had copies made and distributed to his officials.

In 1880, following Chinese advice and breaking with tradition, King Gojong decided to establish diplomatic ties with the United States. After negotiations through Chinese mediation in Tianjin, the Treaty of Peace, Amity, Commerce, and Navigation was formally signed between the United States and Korea in Incheon on 22 May 1882. However, there were two significant issues raised by the treaty. The first concerned Korea's status as an independent nation. During the talks with the Americans, the Chinese insisted that the treaty contain an article declaring that Korea was a dependency of China and argued that the country had long been a tributary state of China. But the Americans firmly opposed such an article, arguing that a treaty with Korea should be based on the Treaty of Ganghwa, which stipulated that Korea was an independent state. A compromise was finally reached, with Shufeldt and Li agreeing that the King of Korea would notify the U.S. president in a letter that Korea had special status as a tributary state of China. The treaty between the Korean government and the United States became the model for all treaties between it and other Western countries. Korea later signed similar trade and commerce treaties with Britain and Germany in 1883, with Italy and Russia in 1884, and with France in 1886. Subsequently, commercial treaties were concluded with other European countries.

=== Korean reforms ===
After 1879, China's relations with Korea came under the authority of Li Hongzhang, who had emerged as one of the most influential figures in China after playing an important role during the Taiping Rebellion, and was also an advocate of the Self-Strengthening Movement. In 1879, Li was appointed as governor-general of Zhili and the imperial commissioner for the northern ports. He was in charge of China's Korea policy and urged Korean officials to adopt China's own self-strengthening program to strengthen their country in response to foreign threats, to which King Gojong was receptive. The Korean government, immediately after opening the country to the outside world, pursued a policy of enlightenment aimed at achieving national prosperity and military strength through the doctrine of tongdo sŏgi (Eastern ways and Western machines). To modernise their country, the Koreans tried selectively to accept and master Western technology while preserving their country's cultural values and heritage.

In January 1881, the government launched administrative reforms and established the T'ongni kimu amun (Office for Extraordinary State Affairs) which was modelled on Chinese administrative structures. Under this overarching organisation, twelve sa or agencies were created. In 1881, a technical mission was sent to Japan to survey its modernised facilities. Officials travelled all over Japan inspecting administrative, military, educational, and industrial facilities. In October, another small group went to Tianjin to study modern weapons manufacturing, and Chinese technicians were invited to manufacture weapons in Seoul. Additionally, as part of their plan to modernise the country, the Koreans had invited the Japanese military attaché Lieutenant Horimoto Reizō to serve as an adviser in creating a modern army. A new military formation called the Pyŏlgigun (Special Skills Force) was established, in which eighty to one hundred young men of the aristocracy were to be given Japanese military training. The following year, in January 1882, the government also reorganised the existing five-army garrison structure into the Muwiyŏng (Palace Guards Garrison) and the Changŏyŏng (Capital Guards Garrison).

=== Japanese insecurities over Korea ===
During the 1880s, discussions in Japan about national security focused on the issue of Korean reform. The political discourse over the two were interlinked; as the German military adviser Major Jakob Meckel stated, Korea was "a dagger pointed at the heart of Japan". What made Korea of strategic concern was not merely its proximity to Japan but its inability to defend itself against outsiders. If Korea were truly independent, it posed no strategic problem to Japan's national security, but if the country remained undeveloped, it would remain weak and consequently would be inviting prey for foreign domination.

The political consensus in Japan was that Korean independence lay, as it had been for Meiji Japan, through the importation of "civilization" from the West. Korea required a program of self-strengthening like the post-Restoration reforms that were enacted in Japan. The Japanese interest in the reform of Korea was not purely altruistic. Not only would these reforms enable Korea to resist foreign intrusion, which was in Japan's direct interest, but through being a conduit of change they would also have opportunity to play a larger role on the peninsula. To Meiji leaders, the issue was not whether Korea should be reformed but how these reforms might be implemented. There was a choice of adopting a passive role which required the cultivation of reformist elements within Korean society and rendering them assistance whenever possible, or adopting a more aggressive policy, actively interfering in Korean politics to assure that reform took place. Many Japanese advocates of Korean reform swung between these two positions.

Japan in the early 1880s was weak, as a result of internal peasant uprisings and samurai rebellions during the previous decade. The country was also struggling financially, with inflation as a result of these internal factors. Subsequently, the Meiji government adopted a passive policy, encouraging the Korean court to follow the Japanese model but offering little concrete assistance except for the dispatch of the small military mission headed by Lieutenant Horimoto Reizo to train the Pyŏlgigun. What worried the Japanese was the Chinese, who had loosened their hold over Korea in 1876 when the Japanese succeeded in establishing a legal basis for Korean independence by ending its tributary status. Chinese actions appeared to be thwarting the forces of reform in Korea and re-asserting their influence over the country.

The insecurities also stemmed from the theories of Yoshida Shōin, who had earlier written that Japan's long-term security depended on an aggressive, expansionist policy. Shōin was the first intellectual to warn of the potential dangers posed by foreign powers to Japan's security and identified the geopolitical importance of Korea to the future of the Japanese nation. The Korean Peninsula represented the most likely point on mainland Asia from which a naval invasion of Japan (or vice versa) could be launched, as demonstrated by the failed Mongol invasions of Japan in the 13th century after conquering Korea and the Japanese experiences in the Imjin War in the late 16th century. The potential profit that could be won by exploiting Korea as a colonial dependency was not lost on the Japanese leaders. As early as 1873, influential Japanese generals and statesmen such as Saigō Takamori had called for an invasion of Korea.

The Japanese perception of encroachment by potential rivals began as early as the late 1850s, when France established control over parts of Southeast Asia with its conquest of Vietnam. The French expansion coincided with the British rule in Burma and its competition with Russia over control of Central Asia. This so-called Great Game between the British Empire and Russia over the gateway to East Asia was viewed by Japan as a potential threat to its long-term security.

The Meiji government viewed the Great Game as problematic as China was being ravaged by colonial partition after the Opium Wars and could not be depended upon as an adequate buffer against European expansionism. Japan would eventually regard Russia as the greatest threat, when the Russians established a strong presence in northeast Asia with the construction of the Trans-Siberian Railway, to which Japanese strategists viewed Russia's ability to project its military might deep into Japan's strategic sphere as a danger to its security.

=== 1882 crisis ===
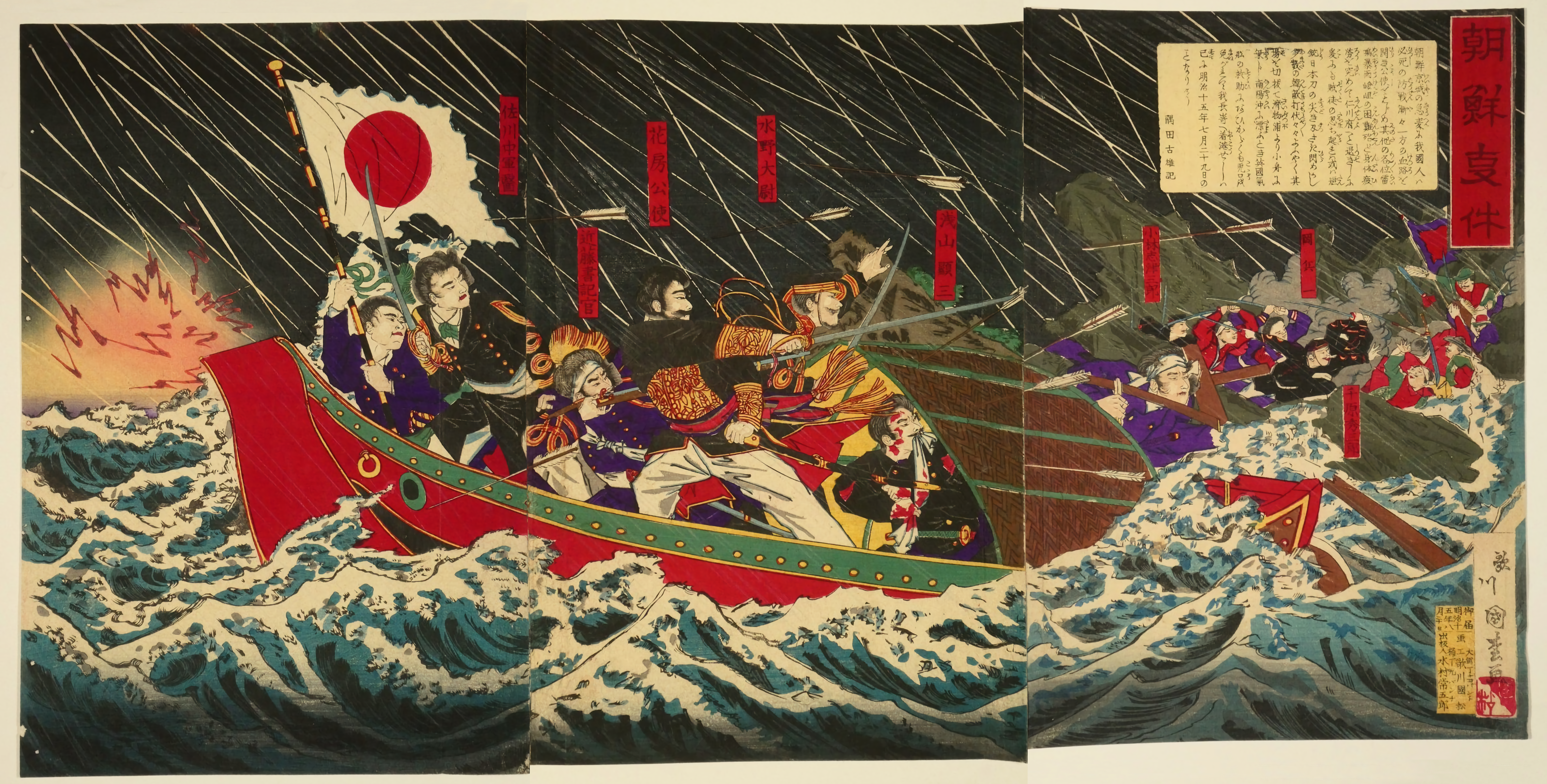
Woodblock print depicting the flight of the Japanese legation in 1882

Early in 1882, the Korean Peninsula experienced a severe drought which led to food shortages, causing much hardship and discord among the population. Korea was on the verge of bankruptcy, falling months behind on military pay, causing deep resentment among the soldiers. There was also resentment towards the Pyŏlgigun on the part of the soldiers of the regular Korean army, as the formation was better equipped and treated. Additionally, more than 1000 soldiers had been discharged in the process of overhauling the army; most were either old or disabled, and the rest had not been given their pay in rice for thirteen months.

In June 1882, King Gojong, being informed of the situation, ordered that a month's allowance of rice be given to the soldiers. He directed Min Gyeom-ho, the overseer of government finances and Queen Min's nephew, to handle the matter. Min in turn handed the matter over to his steward who sold the good rice he had been given and used the money to buy millet which he mixed with sand and bran. As a result, the rice became rotten and inedible. The distribution of the alleged rice infuriated the soldiers. On 23 July, a military mutiny and riot broke out in Seoul. Enraged soldiers headed for the residence of Min Gyeom-ho, who they had suspected of having swindled them out of their rice. Min, on hearing word of the revolt, ordered the police to arrest some of the ringleaders and announced that they would be executed the next morning. He had assumed that this would serve as a warning to the other agitators. However, after learning what had transpired, the rioters broke into Min's house to take vengeance; as he was not at his residence the rioters vented their frustrations by destroying his furniture and other possessions.

The rioters then moved on to an armoury from which they stole weapons and ammunition, and headed for the prison. After overpowering the guards, they released the men who had been arrested that day by Min Gyeom-ho and also many political prisoners. Min then summoned the army to quell the rebellion but it had become too late to suppress the mutiny. The original body of mutineers had been swelled by the poor and disaffected citizenry of the city; as a result the revolt had assumed major proportions. The rioters now turned their attention to the Japanese. One group headed to Lieutenant Horimoto's quarters and killed him. Another group, some 3,000 strong, headed for the Japanese legation, where Hanabusa Yoshitada the minister to Korea and twenty seven members of the legation resided.

The mob surrounded the legation shouting its intention of killing all the Japanese inside. Hanabusa gave orders to burn the legation and important documents were set on fire. As the flames quickly spread, the members of the legation escaped through a rear gate, where they fled to the harbour and boarded a boat which took them down the Han River to Chemulpo. Taking refuge with the Incheon commandant, they were again forced to flee after word arrived of the events in Seoul and the attitude of their hosts changed. They escaped to the harbour during heavy rain and were pursued by Korean soldiers. Six Japanese were killed, and another five were seriously wounded. The survivors carrying the wounded then boarded a small boat and headed for the open sea where three days later they were rescued by a British survey ship, HMS Flying Fish, which took them to Nagasaki. The next day, after the attack on the Japanese legation, the rioters forced their way into the royal palace where they found and killed Min Gyeom-ho, and a dozen other high-ranking officers. They also searched for Queen Min who narrowly escaped, dressed as an ordinary lady of the court, and was carried on the back of a faithful guard who claimed she was his sister. The Daewongun used the incident to reassert his power.

The Chinese then deployed about 4,500 troops to Korea, under General Wu Changqing, which effectively regained control and quelled the rebellion. In response, the Japanese also sent four warships and a battalion of troops to Seoul to safeguard Japanese interests and demand reparations. Tensions subsided with the Treaty of Chemulpo, signed on the evening of 30 August 1882. The agreement specified that the Korean conspirators would be punished and ¥50,000 would be paid to the families of slain Japanese. The Japanese government would also receive ¥500,000, a formal apology, and permission to station troops at their diplomatic legation in Seoul. In the aftermath of rebellion, the Daewongun was accused of fomenting the rebellion and its violence, and was arrested by the Chinese and taken to Tianjin. He was later carried off to a town about sixty miles southwest of Beijing, where for three years he was confined to one room and kept under strict surveillance.

=== Re-assertion of Chinese influence ===
After the Imo Incident, early reform efforts in Korea suffered a major setback. In the aftermath of the incident, the Chinese reasserted their influence over the peninsula, where they began to interfere in Korean internal affairs directly. After stationing troops at strategic points in the capital Seoul, the Chinese undertook several initiatives to gain significant influence over the Korean government. The Qing dispatched two special advisers on foreign affairs representing Chinese interests to Korea: the German Paul Georg von Möllendorff, a close confidant of Li Hongzhang, and the Chinese diplomat Ma Jianzhong. A staff of Chinese officers also took over the training of the army, providing the Koreans with 1,000 rifles, two cannons, and 10,000 rounds of ammunition. Furthermore, the Chingunyeong (Capital Guards Command), a new Korean military formation, was created and trained along Chinese lines by Yuan Shikai.

In October, the two countries signed a treaty stipulating that Korea was dependent on China and granted Chinese merchants the right to conduct overland and maritime business freely within its borders. It also gave the Chinese advantages over the Japanese and Westerners and granted them unilateral extraterritoriality privileges in civil and criminal cases. Under the treaty, the number of Chinese merchants and traders significantly increased, a severe blow to Korean merchants. Although it allowed Koreans reciprocally to trade in Beijing, the agreement was not a treaty but was in effect issued as a regulation for a vassal. Additionally, during the following year, the Chinese supervised the creation of a Korean Maritime Customs Service, headed by von Möllendorff. Korea was reduced to a semi-colonial tributary state of China with King Gojong unable to appoint diplomats without Chinese approval, and with troops stationed in the country to protect Chinese interests. (Note: A Korean historian stated that "the Chinese government began to turn its former tributary state into a semi-colony and its policy toward Korea substantially changed to a new imperialistic one where the suzerain state demanded certain privileges in her vassal state".) China also obtained concessions in Korea, notably the Chinese concession of Incheon.

=== Factional rivalry and ascendancy of the Min clan ===
During the 1880s two rival factions emerged in Korea. One was a small group of reformers that had centered around the Gaehwadang (Enlightenment Party), which had become frustrated at the limited scale and arbitrary pace of reforms. The members who constituted the Enlightenment Party were well-educated Koreans and most were from the yangban class. They were impressed by the developments in Meiji Japan and were eager to emulate them. Members included Kim Okkyun, Pak Yŏnghyo, Hong Yeong-sik, Seo Gwang-beom, and Philip Jaisohn. The group was also relatively young; Pak Yung-hio came from a prestigious lineage related to the royal family and was 23, Hong was 29, Seo Gwang-beom was 25, and Soh Jaipil was 20, with Kim Okkyun being the oldest at 33. All had spent some time in Japan; Pak Yung-hio had been part of a mission sent to Japan to apologise for the Imo incident in 1882. He had been accompanied by Seo Gwang-beom and by Kim Okkyun, who later came under the influence of Japanese modernizers such as Fukuzawa Yukichi. Kim Okkyun, while studying in Japan, had also cultivated friendships with influential Japanese figures and became the de facto leader of the group. They were also strongly nationalistic and desired to make their country truly independent by ending Chinese interference in Korea's internal affairs and break away its dependency on great powers (Sadae-ju-ui).

The Sadaedang was a group of conservatives, which included not only Min Yeong-ik from the Min family but also other prominent Korean political figures that wanted to maintain power with China's help. Although the members of the Sadaedang supported the enlightenment policy, they favoured gradual changes based on the Chinese model. After the Imo incident, the Min clan pursued a pro-Chinese policy. This was also partly a matter of opportunism as the intervention by Chinese troops led to subsequent exile of the rival Daewongun in Tianjin and the expansion of Chinese influence in Korea, but it also reflected an ideological disposition shared by many Koreans toward the more comfortable and traditional relationship as a tributary of China. Consequently, the Min clan became advocates of the dongdo seogi ("adopting Western knowledge while keeping Eastern values") philosophy, which had originated from the ideas of moderate Chinese reformers who had emphasised the need to maintain the perceived superior cultural values and heritage of the Sino-centric world while recognising the importance of acquiring and adopting Western technology, particularly military technology, to preserve autonomy. Hence, rather than major institutional reforms such as the adoption of new values such as legal equality or introducing modern education like in Meiji Japan, the advocates of this school of thought sought piecemeal adoptions of institutions that would strengthen the state while preserving the basic social, political, and cultural order. Through the ascendancy of Queen Min to the throne, the Min clan had also been able to use newly created government institutions as bases for political power; subsequently with their growing monopoly of key positions they frustrated the ambitions of the Enlightenment Party.

=== Kapsin Coup ===
In the two years preceding the Imo incident, the members of the Gaehwadang had failed to secure appointments to vital offices in the government and were unable to implement their reform plans. As a consequence they were prepared to seize power by any means necessary. In 1884, an opportunity to seize power by staging a coup d'état against the Sadaedang presented itself. In August, as hostilities between France and China erupted over Annam, half of the Chinese troops stationed in Korea were withdrawn. On 4 December 1884, with the help of Japanese minister Takezoe Shinichiro who promised to mobilise Japanese legation guards to provide assistance, the reformers staged their coup under the guise of a banquet hosted by Hong Yeong-sik, the director of the General Postal Administration. The banquet was to celebrate the opening of the new national post office. King Gojong was expected to attend together with several foreign diplomats and high-ranking officials, most of whom were members of the pro-Chinese Sadaedang faction. Kim Okkyun and his comrades approached King Gojong falsely stating that Chinese troops had created a disturbance and escorted him to the small Gyoengu Palace, where they placed him in the custody of Japanese legation guards. They then proceeded to kill and wound several senior officials of the Sadaedang faction.

After the coup, the Gaehwadang members formed a new government and devised a program of reform. The radical 14-point reform proposal stated that the following conditions be met: an end to Korea's tributary relationship with China; the abolition of ruling-class privilege and the establishment of equal rights for all; the reorganisation of the government as virtually a constitutional monarchy; the revision of land tax laws; cancellation of the grain loan system; the unification of all internal fiscal administrations under the jurisdiction of the Ho-jo; the suppression of privileged merchants and the development of free commerce and trade, the creation of a modern police system including police patrols and royal guards; and severe punishment of corrupt officials.

However, the new government lasted no longer than a few days. This was possibly inevitable, as the reformers were supported by no more than 140 Japanese troops who faced at least 1,500 Chinese garrisoned in Seoul, under the command of General Yuan Shikai. With the reform measures being a threat to her clan's power, Queen Min secretly requested military intervention from the Chinese. Consequently, within three days, even before the reform measures were made public, the coup was suppressed by Chinese troops who attacked and defeated the Japanese forces and restored power to the pro-Chinese Sadaedang faction. During the ensuing melee Hong Yeong-sik was killed, the Japanese legation building was burned down and forty Japanese were killed. The surviving Korean coup leaders including Kim Okkyun escaped to the port of Chemulpo under escort of the Japanese minister Takezoe. From there they boarded a Japanese ship for exile in Japan.

In January 1885, with a show of force the Japanese dispatched two battalions and seven warships to Korea, which resulted in the Japan–Korea Treaty of 1885, signed on 9 January 1885. The treaty restored diplomatic relations between Japan and Korea. The Koreans also agreed to pay the Japanese ¥100,000 for damages to their legation and to provide a site for the building of a new legation. Prime Minister Itō Hirobumi, to overcome Japan's disadvantageous position in Korea followed by the abortive coup, visited China to discuss the matter with his Chinese counterpart, Li Hongzhang. The two parties succeeded in concluding the Convention of Tianjin on 31 May 1885. They also pledged to withdraw their troops from Korea within four months, with prior notification to the other if troops were to be sent to Korea in the future. After both countries withdrew their forces they left behind a precarious balance of power on the Korean Peninsula between the two nations. Meanwhile, Yuan Shikai remained in Seoul, appointed as the Chinese Resident, and continued to interfere with Korean domestic politics. The failure of the coup also marked a dramatic decline in Japanese influence over Korea.

=== Nagasaki incident ===
The Nagasaki incident was a riot that took place in the Japanese port city of Nagasaki in 1886. Four warships from the Qing Empire's navy, the Beiyang Fleet, stopped at Nagasaki, apparently to carry out repairs. Some Chinese sailors caused trouble in the city and started the riot. Several Japanese policemen confronting the rioters were killed. The Qing government did not apologise after the incident, which resulted in a wave of anti-Chinese sentiment in Japan.

=== Bean controversy ===
A poor harvest in 1889 led the governor of Korea's Hamgyong Province to prohibit soybean exports to Japan. Japan requested and received compensation in 1893 for their importers. The incident highlighted the growing dependence Japan felt on Korean food imports.

== Prelude to the war ==
=== Kim Okkyun affair ===
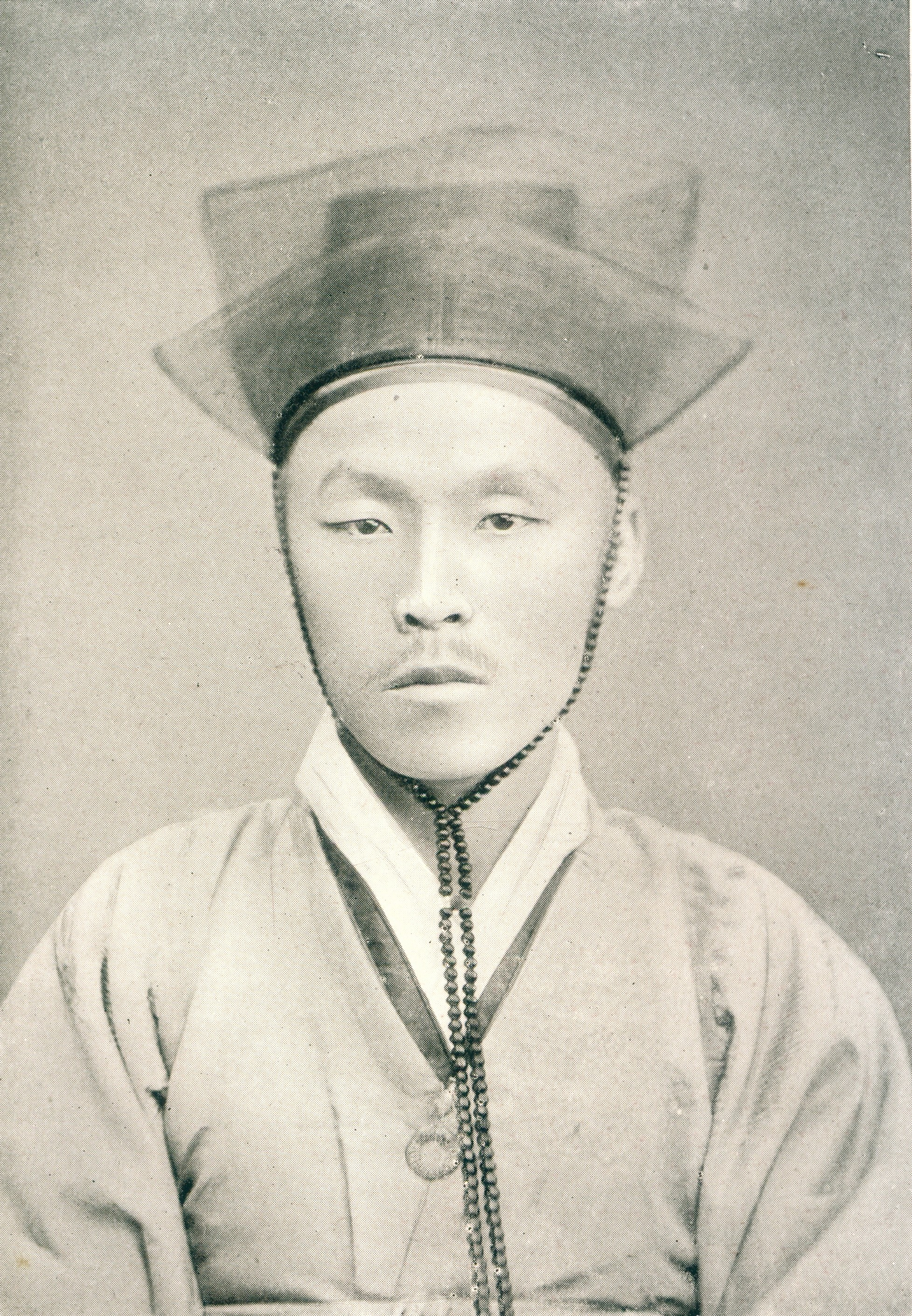
1882 photograph of Kim Okkyun taken in Nagasaki. His assassination in China would contribute to tensions leading to the First Sino-Japanese War.

On 28 March 1894, a pro-Japanese Korean revolutionary, Kim Okkyun, was assassinated in Shanghai. Kim had fled to Japan after his involvement in the 1884 coup, and the Japanese had turned down Korean demands for him to be extradited. Many Japanese activists saw in him potential for a future role in Korean modernisation; however, Meiji government leaders were more cautious. After some reservations, they exiled him to the Bonin (Ogasawara) Islands. Ultimately, he was lured to Shanghai, where he was killed by a Korean, Hong Jong-u, in his room at a Japanese inn in the International Settlement. After some hesitation, the Shanghai Municipal Council concluded that rules against extradition did not apply to a corpse and turned his body over to Chinese authorities. His body was then taken aboard a Chinese warship and sent back to Korea, where it was cut up by the Korean authorities, quartered and displayed in all Korean provinces as a warning to other purported rebels and traitors.

In Tokyo, the Japanese government took that as an outrageous affront. Kim Okkyun's brutal murder was portrayed as a betrayal by Li Hongzhang and a setback for Japan's stature and dignity. The Chinese authorities refused to press charges against the assassin, and he was even allowed to accompany Kim's mutilated body back to Korea, where he was showered with rewards and honours. Kim's assassination had also called Japan's commitment to its Korean supporters into question. The police in Tokyo had foiled an earlier attempt during the same year to assassinate Pak Yŏnghyo, one of the other Korean leaders of the 1884 uprising. When two suspected Korean assassins received asylum at the Korean legation, that had instigated a diplomatic outrage as well. Although the Japanese government could have immediately used Kim's assassination to its advantage, it concluded that since Kim had died on Chinese territory, the treatment of the corpse was outside its authority.

The shocking murder of the Korean inflamed Japanese opinion since many Japanese considered the Chinese-supported actions to be directed against Japan as well. To the Japanese, the Chinese had also showed their contempt for international law when they set free the suspected assassin, who had been arrested by the Shanghai Municipal Police and then, in accordance with treaty obligations, turned over to the Chinese for trial. Nationalistic groups immediately began to call for war with China.

=== Donghak Rebellion ===
Tensions ran high between China and Japan, but war was not yet inevitable, and the fury in Japan over Kim's assassination began to dissipate. However, in late April, the Donghak Rebellion erupted in Korea. Korean peasants rose up in open rebellion against oppressive taxation and incompetent financial administration of the Joseon government. It was the largest peasant rebellion in Korean history. However, on 1 June, rumours reached the Donghaks that the Chinese and Japanese were on the verge of sending troops and so the rebels agreed to a ceasefire to remove any grounds for foreign intervention.

On 2 June, the Japanese cabinet decided to send troops to Korea if China did the same. In May, the Chinese had taken steps to prepare for the mobilisation of their forces in the provinces of Zhili, Shandong and in Manchuria as a result of the tense situation on the Korean Peninsula. However, those actions were planned more as an armed demonstration to strengthen the Chinese position in Korea than as preparation for war against Japan. On 3 June, King Gojong, on the recommendation of the Min clan and at the insistence of Yuan Shikai, requested aid from the Chinese government in suppressing the Donghak Rebellion. Although the rebellion was not as serious as it had initially seemed and so the Chinese forces were not necessary, the decision was made to send 2,500 men under the command of General Ye Zhichao to the harbour of Asan, about 70 km (43 mi) from Seoul. The troops destined for Korea sailed on board three British-owned steamers chartered by the Chinese government, arriving at Asan on 9 June. On 25 June, a further 400 troops had arrived. Consequently, by the end of June, Ye Zhichao had about 2,900 soldiers under his command at Asan.

Closely watching the events on the peninsula, the Japanese government had quickly become convinced that the rebellion would lead to Chinese intervention in Korea. As a result, soon after learning of the Korean government's request for Chinese military help, all Japanese warships in the vicinity were immediately ordered to Pusan and Chemulpo. By 9 June, Japanese warships had consecutively called at Chemulpo and Pusan. A formation of 420 sailors, selected from the crews of warships anchored in Chemulpo, was immediately dispatched to Seoul, where they served as a temporary counterbalance to the Chinese troops camped at Asan. Simultaneously, a reinforced brigade of approximately 8,000 troops (the Oshima Composite Brigade), under the command of General Ōshima Yoshimasa, was also dispatched to Chemulpo by 27 June.

According to the Japanese, the Chinese government had violated the Convention of Tientsin by not informing the Japanese government of its decision to send troops, but the Chinese claimed that Japan had approved the decision. The Japanese countered by sending an expeditionary force to Korea. The first 400 troops arrived on 9 June en route to Seoul, and 3,000 landed at Incheon on 12 June.

However, Japanese officials denied any intention to intervene. As a result, the Qing viceroy Li Hongzhang "was lured into believing that Japan would not wage war, but the Japanese were fully prepared to act". The Qing government turned down Japan's suggestion for Japan and China to co-operate to reform the Korean government. When Korea demanded that Japan withdraw its troops from Korea, the Japanese refused.

In July 1894, the 8,000 Japanese troops captured the Korean king Gojong and occupied the Gyeongbokgung in Seoul. By 25 July, they had replaced the existing Korean government with members of the pro-Japanese faction. Even though Qing forces were already leaving Korea after they found themselves unneeded there, the new pro-Japanese Korean government granted Japan the right to expel Qing forces, and Japan dispatched more troops to Korea. The Qing Empire rejected the new Korean government as illegitimate.

== Status of the combatants ==
=== Japan ===
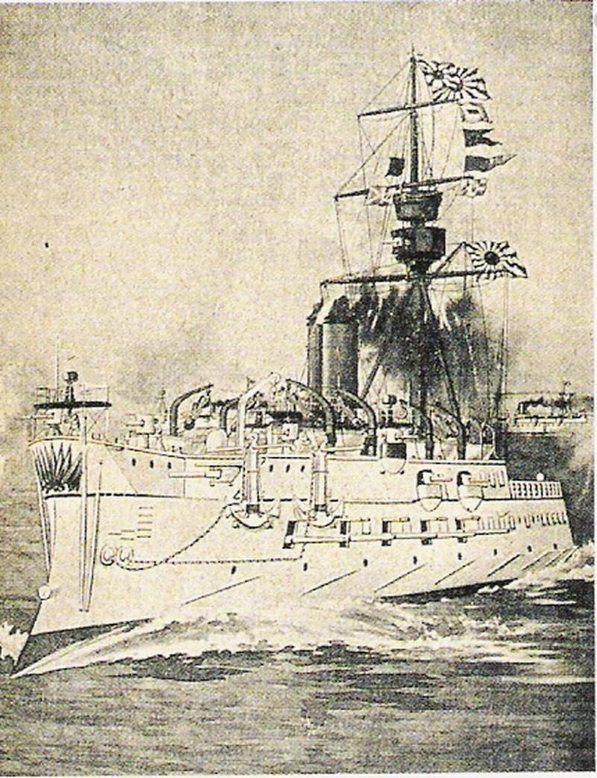
The French-built Matsushima, flagship of the Imperial Japanese Navy during the First Sino-Japanese War

Japan, though merely a tiny country in the East, is nevertheless able to increase its ironclads year after year. I have heard that the vessels they manufacture are designed specifically for comparison with ours: our ironclads can make fifteen nautical miles, while theirs can reach sixteen.

Dingyuan and Zhenyuan carry large guns of 30.5 cm caliber, but their ships—Matsushima and the other three—are equipped with 24-cm main guns together with rapid-fire artillery, surpassing us in every respect.

As for the first-class ironclad they are now ordering from Britain, who knows what new model it will be? It is because the entire strength of their nation is concentrated upon the navy that they have achieved all this. Their country must not be underestimated!

— Li Hongzhang

Japanese reforms under the Meiji government gave significant priority to the creation of an effective modern national army and navy, especially naval construction. Japan sent numerous military officials abroad for training and evaluation of the relative strengths and tactics of Western armies and navies.

==== Imperial Japanese Navy ====
The Imperial Japanese Navy was modelled after the British Royal Navy, at the time the foremost naval power. British advisors were sent to Japan to train the naval establishment, while Japanese students were in turn sent to Britain to study and observe the Royal Navy. Through drilling and tuition by Royal Navy instructors, Japan developed naval officers expert in the arts of gunnery and seamanship. At the start of hostilities, the Imperial Japanese Navy was composed of a fleet of 12 modern warships, (the protected cruiser Izumi being added during the war), eight corvettes, one ironclad warship, 26 torpedo boats, and numerous auxiliary/armed merchant cruisers and converted liners. During peacetime, the warships of the Imperial Japanese Navy were divided among three main naval bases at Yokosuka, Kure and Sasebo and following mobilisation, the navy was composed of five divisions of seagoing warships and three flotillas of torpedo boats with a fourth being formed at the beginning of hostilities. The Japanese also had a relatively large merchant navy, which at the beginning of 1894 consisted of 288 vessels. Of these, 66 belonged to the Nippon Yusen Kaisha shipping company, which received national subsidies from the Japanese government to maintain the vessels for use by the navy in time of war. As a consequence, the navy could call on a sufficient number of auxiliaries and transports.

Japan did not yet have the resources to acquire battleships and so planned to employ the Jeune École doctrine, which favoured small, fast warships, especially cruisers and torpedo boats, with the offensive capability to destroy larger craft. The Japanese naval leadership, on the eve of hostilities, was generally cautious and even apprehensive, as the navy had not yet received the warships ordered in February 1893, particularly the battleships Fuji and Yashima and the protected cruiser Akashi. Hence, initiating hostilities at the time was not ideal, and the navy was far less confident than the army about the outcome of a war with China.

Many of Japan's major warships were built in British and French shipyards (eight British, three French and two Japanese-built) and 16 of the torpedo boats were known to have been built in France and assembled in Japan.

==== Imperial Japanese Army ====
The Meiji government at first modelled their army after the French Army. French advisers had been sent to Japan with two military missions (in 1872–1880 and 1884), in addition to one mission under the shogunate. Nationwide conscription was enforced in 1873 and a Western-style conscript army was established; military schools and arsenals were also built. In 1886, Japan turned toward the German-Prussian model as the basis for its army, adopting German doctrines and the German military system and organisation. In 1885 Jakob Meckel, a German adviser, implemented new measures, such as the reorganisation of the command structure into divisions and regiments; the strengthening of army logistics, transportation, and structures (thereby increasing mobility); and the establishment of artillery and engineering regiments as independent commands. It was also an army that was equal to European armed forces in every respect.

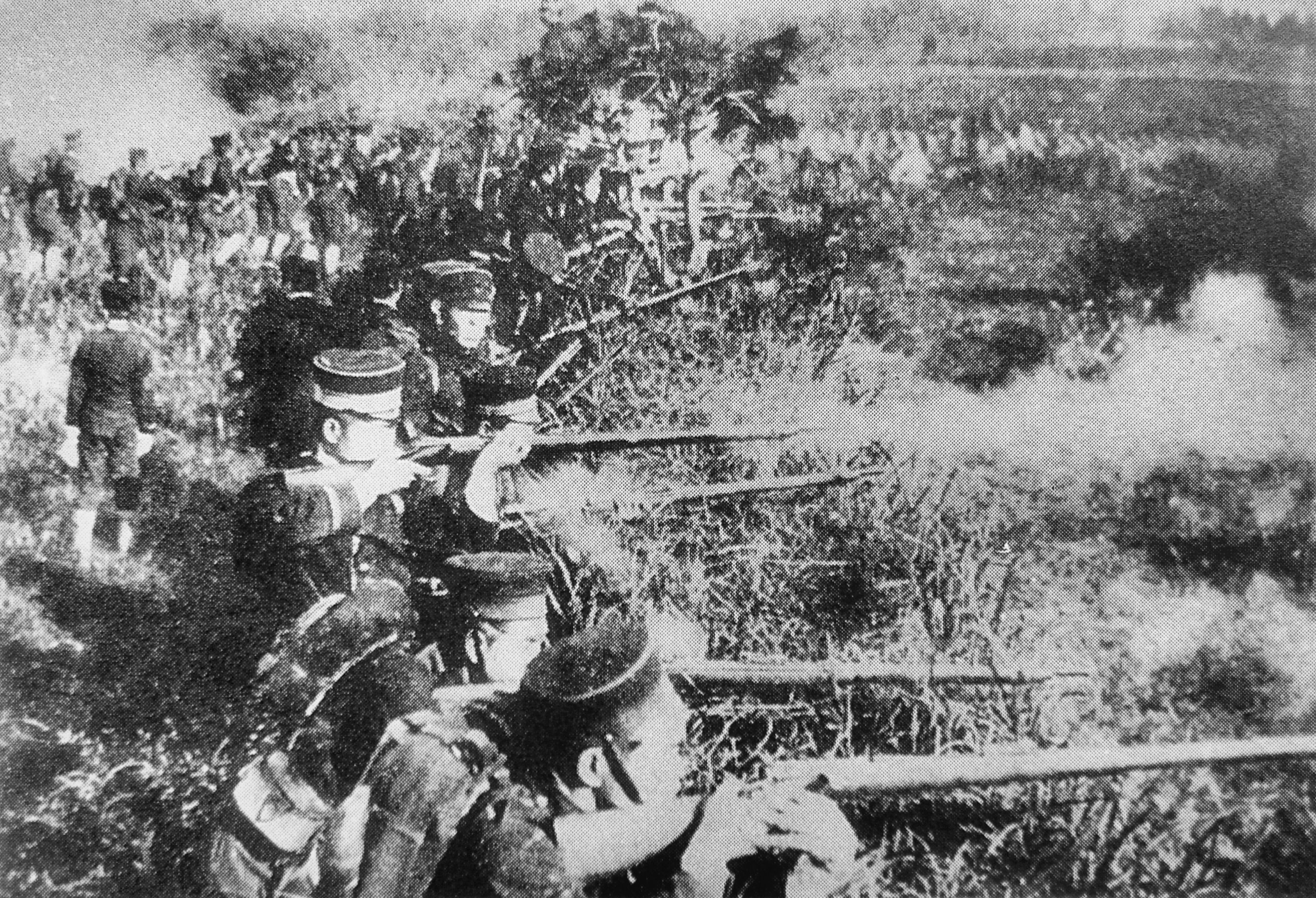
Japanese troops during the First Sino-Japanese War

On the eve of the outbreak of the war with China all men between the ages of 17 and 40 years were eligible for conscription, but only those who turned 20 were to be drafted while those who had turned 17 could volunteer. All men between the ages of 17 and 40, even those who had not received military training or were physically unfit, were considered part of the territorial militia or national guard (kokumin). Following the period of active military service (gen-eki), which lasted for three years, the soldiers became part of the first Reserve (yōbi numbering 92,000 in 1893) and then the second Reserve (kōbi numbering 106,000 in 1893). All young and able-bodied men who did not receive basic military training due to exceptions and those conscripts who had not fully met the physical requirements of military service, became third Reserve (hojū). In time of war, the first Reserve (yōbi) were to be called up first and they were intended to fill the ranks of the regular army units. Next to be called up were the kōbi reserve who were to be either used to further fill in the ranks of line units or to be formed into new ones. The hojū reserve members were to be called up only in exceptional circumstances, and the territorial militia or national guard would only be called up in case of an immediate enemy attack on or invasion of Japan.

The country was divided into six military districts (headquarters Tokyo, Osaka, Nagoya, Sendai, Hiroshima and Kumamoto), with each being a recruitment area for a square infantry division consisting of two brigades of two regiments. Each of these divisions contained approximately 18,600 troops and 36 artillery pieces when mobilised. There was also an Imperial Guard division which recruited nationally, from all around Japan. This division was also composed of two brigades but had instead two-battalion, not three-battalion, regiments; consequently its numerical strength after mobilisation was 12,500 troops and 24 artillery pieces. In addition, there were fortress troops consisting of approximately six battalions, the Colonial Corps of about 4,000 troops which was stationed on Hokkaido and the Ryukyu Islands, and a battalion of military police in each of the districts. In peacetime the regular army had a total of fewer than 70,000 men, while after mobilisation the numbers rose to over 220,000. Moreover, the army still had a trained reserve, which, following the mobilisation of the first-line divisions, could be formed into reserve brigades. These reserve brigades each consisted of four battalions, a cavalry unit, a company of engineers, an artillery battery and rear-echelon units. They were to serve as recruiting bases for their front-line divisions and could also perform secondary combat operations, and if necessary they could be expanded into full divisions with a total of 24 territorial force regiments. However, formation of these units was hindered by a lack of sufficient amounts of equipment, especially uniforms.

Japanese troops were equipped with the 8-mm single-shot Murata Type 18 breech-loading rifle. The improved eight-round-magazine Type 22 was just being introduced and consequently in 1894, on the eve of the war, only the Imperial Guard and 4th Division were equipped with these rifles. The division artillery consisted of 75-mm field guns and mountain pieces manufactured in Osaka. The artillery was based on Krupp designs that were adapted by the Italians at the beginning of the 1880s; although it could hardly be described as modern in 1894, in general it still matched contemporary battlefield requirements.

By the 1890s, Japan had at its disposal a modern, professionally trained Western-style army which was relatively well equipped and supplied. Its officers had studied in Europe and were well educated in the latest strategy and tactics. By the start of the war, the Imperial Japanese Army could field a total force of 120,000 men in two armies and five divisions.

The Japanese army despite the integration of supply troops into its divisions was unable to rely on its pre-existing logistical system and personnel to sustain its armies in the field with 153,000 labourers, contractors, and drivers being contracted to sustain the armies in the field. Supply issues and a general lack of preparedness for a sustained war would routinely delay operations and slow down the Japanese field armies as seen in the Yingkou Campaign, troops often had to forage or steal from the local populace and medicine and winter clothing was often in short supply during the latter stages of the war.

The Japanese Army also possessed a large amount of coastal guns at key locations which could be used for siege operations, these weapons were as follows:

- 50 280-mm Howitzers
- 38 274-mm guns
- 45 240-mm guns
- 40 150-mm guns
- 42 120-mm guns
- various smaller pieces

=== China ===
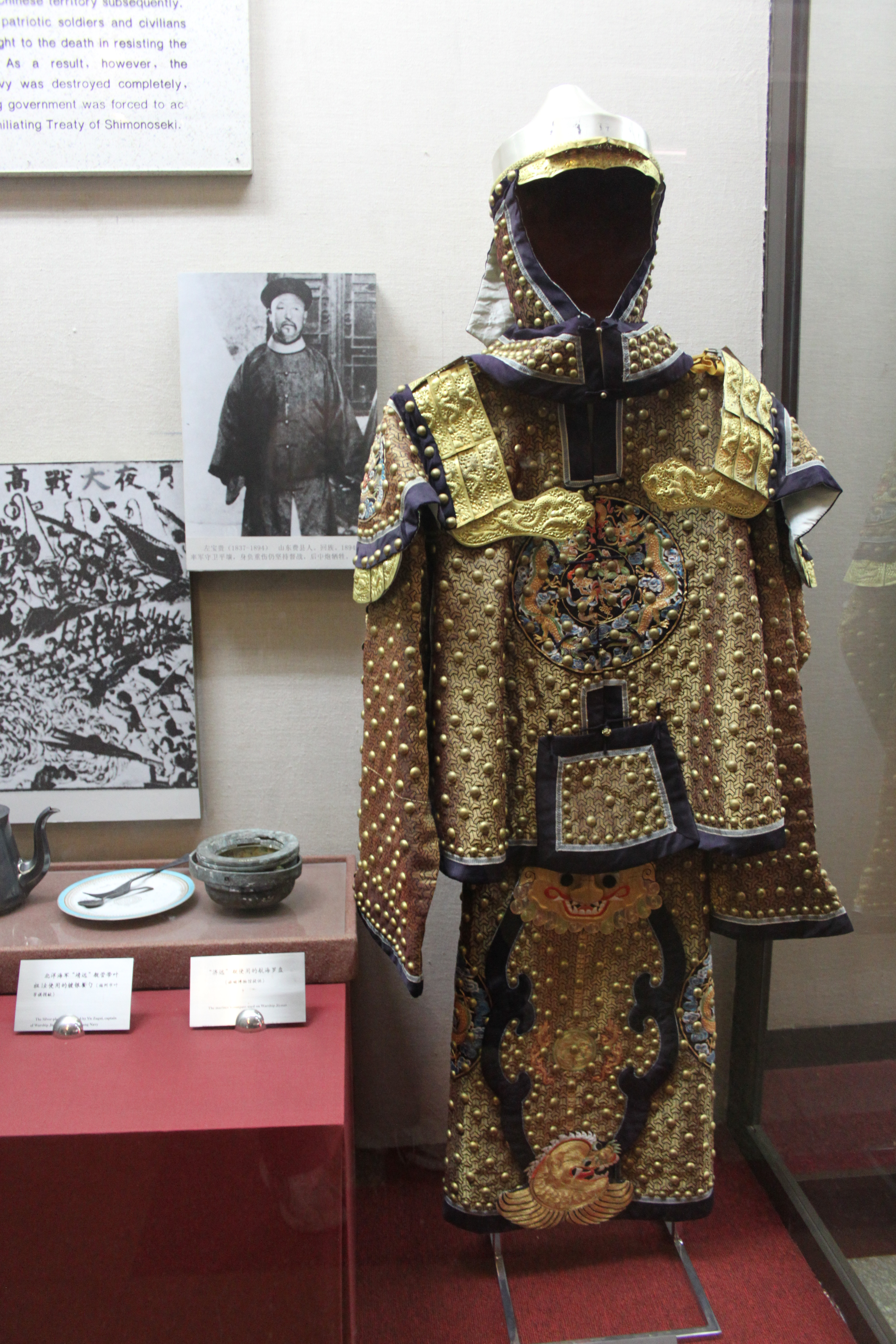
The uniform of a Chinese commander during the war on display at the Military Museum of the Chinese People's Revolution

The prevailing view in many Western circles was that the modernised Chinese military would crush the Japanese. Observers commended Chinese units such as the Huai Army and Beiyang Fleet. (Note: "On the eve of the Sino-Japanese War, China appeared, to undiscerning observers, to possess respectable military and naval forces. Praise for Li Hung-chang's Anhwei Army and other Chinese forces was not uncommon, and the Peiyang Navy elicited considerable favourable comment. When war between China and Japan appeared likely, most Westerners thought China had the advantage. Her army was vast, and her navy both outnumbered and outweight Japan's. The German general staff considered a Japanese victory improbable. In an interview with Reuters, William Lang predicted defeat for Japan. Lang thought that the Chinese navy was well-drilled, the ships were fit, the artillery was at least adequate, and the coastal forts were strong. Weihaiwei, he said, was impregnable. Although Lang emphasised that everything depended on how China's forces were led, he had faith that 'in the end, there is no doubt that Japan must be utterly crushed'.") The German General Staff predicted a Japanese defeat and William Lang, who was a British advisor to the Chinese military, praised Chinese training, ships, guns, and fortifications, stating that "in the end, there is no doubt that Japan must be utterly crushed".

==== Imperial Chinese Army ====
The Qing dynasty did not have a unified national army, but was made up of three main components, with the so-called Eight Banners forming the elite. The Eight Banners forces were segregated along ethnic lines into separate Manchu, Han Chinese, Mongol, Hui (Muslim) and other ethnic formations. Bannermen who made up the Eight Banners got higher pay than the rest of the army while the Manchu received further privileges. In total, there were 250,000 soldiers in the Eight Banners, with over 60 per cent kept in garrisons in Beijing, while the remaining 40 per cent served as garrison troops in other major Chinese cities.

The Green Standard Army was a 600,000-strong gendarmerie-type force that was recruited from the majority Han Chinese population. Its soldiers were not given any peacetime basic military training, but were expected to fight in any conflict. The third component was an irregular force called the Braves, which were used as a kind of reserve force for the regular army, and which were usually recruited from the more distant or remote provinces of China. They were formed into very loosely organised units from the same province. The Braves were sometimes described as mercenaries, with their volunteers receiving as much military training as their commanders saw fit. With no fixed unit organisation, it is impossible to know how many battle-ready Braves there actually were in 1894. There were also a few other military formations, one of which was the Huai Army, which was under the personal authority of Li Hongzhang and was created originally to suppress the Taiping Rebellion (1850–1864). The Huai Army had received limited training by Western military advisors; numbering nearly 45,000 troops, it was considered the best-armed military unit in China.

However, there is no definitive estimate for the size of the Qing armies in this war and scholarly estimates vary widely.

Size of the Qing armies according to various sources
Armies	Gawlikowski	Vladimir	Du Boulay	Putyata	Olender	Powell	Mesny
Bannermen	Not given	276,000	325,600	230,000	250,000 (100,000 actual)		320,000
Braves (Yong Ying)	125,000	97,000	408,300*		120,000		Xiang army 80,000 Huai Army 69,800
Green Standard	Not given	~600,000	357,150		1,000,000 (paper) 450,000–600,000 (actual)		555,000
Trained	230,000–240,000	12,000	408,300*		100,000 maximum		
Militia	Not given	Manchurian army 175,000 (paper) 13,500 (actual)	Not given	1,025,000	300,000 maximum		Manchurian army 61,200
Total (paper)	375,000	1,160,000	1,091,150	1,255,000	1,770,000		
Total (actual)	375,000	998,500	less than 1,091,150	1,255,000	1,070,000–1,220,000	350,000 (fielded)	1,086,000

*the figure does not distinguish between the two armies.

The Japanese Imperial General Staff estimated that they would face no more than 350,000 effective Chinese soldiers. This corresponds well with the estimate of the Board of war from 1898 which states that the total of the provincial militia, Defense army (Yong ying), Disciplined army (modernised Green standard), and new-style forces (organised after the war) was approximately 360,000. Du Boulay confirms this with the total army strength of the army in Zhili, Shandong and Manchuria amounting to 357,100 (Zhili, Shandong, and Manchuria) and 1,000,000 total trained men in the empire.

Deployments of Qing forces
Location	Bannermen	Green Standard	Trained troops	Total
Zhili	143,270	34,370	66,980	244,620
Shandong	2,510	17,390	18,400	38,300
Liaoning	16,050		22,300	38,360
Heilongjiang	8,080		8,040	16,120
Jilin	10,400		9,300	19,700
Subtotal	180,310	51,760	125,030	357,100
Rest of China	145,290	305,390	283,800	734,480
Grand Total	325,600	357,150	408,820	1,091,580

Due to various factors such as the limited transport capacity (the absence of any railway in the combat zone), provincial infighting and a general lack of capacity for accommodating soldiers, only a small portion of the army that could be fielded was actually deployed, even forces that were mobilised, including the strong Hunan forces of Liu Kunyi were not able to arrive in time to make a meaningful difference. This meant that the fighting primarily fell on the forces already in Zhili, Shandong and Manchuria. This was a similar situation as what occurred in the Opium Wars, as the much larger Chinese army found itself outnumbered in those conflicts as it did this one.

Chinese forces were also far behind the Japanese in terms of support services; there was a complete absence of engineers, quartermasters, transportation, signal and medical troops. Hired labour (coolies) often performed transportation duties and rudimentary engineering tasks, supply was organised by the province where the soldiers were fighting and left to civilian officials assigned as quartermasters and a few doctors were attached to the army at the rear. This lack of adequate supply organisation led to some units receiving the wrong ammunition for their rifles (on the presumption they possessed rifles).

The basic tactical unit of the Chinese army was the battalion (ying), composed on paper of 500 men, though in reality actual strength was 350 for the infantry and 250 for the cavalry. Up to a dozen of these Ying would form an independent corps, and only at a corps level did Chinese units receive artillery.

Although the Chinese had established arsenals to produce firearms, and a large number of them had been imported from abroad, 40 per cent of Chinese troops at the outbreak of the war were not issued with rifles or even muskets. Instead they were armed with a variety of swords, spears, pikes, halberds, and bows and arrows. Against well-trained, well-armed, and disciplined Japanese troops, they would have little chance. Those units that did have firearms were equipped with a heterogeneity of weapons, from a variety of modern rifles to old-fashioned muskets; this lack of standardisation led to a major problem with the proper supply of ammunition.

Chinese troops were often not drilled in how to use their guns with training conducted with spears. Due to the officer corps' resistance to modern training practices, training with guns was performed only at a distance of 50 ft instead of the longer ranges which were more common in combat. There was also a lack of discipline within the army, as troops would routinely flee before, during, or after combat as occurred in the Battle of Pyongyang. Chinese artillerymen likewise did not receive adequate training in operating their artillery pieces.

The Imperial Chinese Army in 1894 was a heterogeneous mixture of modernised, partly modernised, and almost medieval units which no commander could have led successfully, resulting in poor leadership among Chinese officers. Chinese officers did not know how to handle their troops and the older, higher-ranking officers still believed that they could fight a war as they had during the Taiping Rebellion of 1850–1864. This was also the result of the Chinese military forces being divided into largely independent regional commands. The soldiers were drawn from diverse provinces that had no affinity with each other. Chinese troops also suffered from poor morale, largely because many of the troops had not been paid for a long time. The low prestige of soldiers in Chinese society also hindered morale, and the use of opium and other narcotics was rife throughout the army. Low morale and poor leadership seriously reduced the effectiveness of Chinese troops, and contributed to defeats such as the abandonment of the very well-fortified and defensible Weihaiwei. Additionally, military logistics were lacking, as the construction of railroads in Manchuria had been discouraged.

The Huai Army troops (also sometimes referred to as the Beiyang Army), although they were a small minority in the overall Imperial Chinese Army, were to take part in the majority of the fighting during the war. They were organised in 51 battalions and were estimated to number from 25,000 to 45,000. The Huai Army units that faced the Japanese in Korea did have a significant amount of modern weaponry, including Mauser breech-loading rifles that were comparable to the Murata rifles of the Japanese, and Krupp artillery pieces. After their defeat in Korea, the Qing deployed additional forces to defend northeast China, including partially-reformed Green Standard troops that were poorly equipped.

==== Beiyang Fleet ====
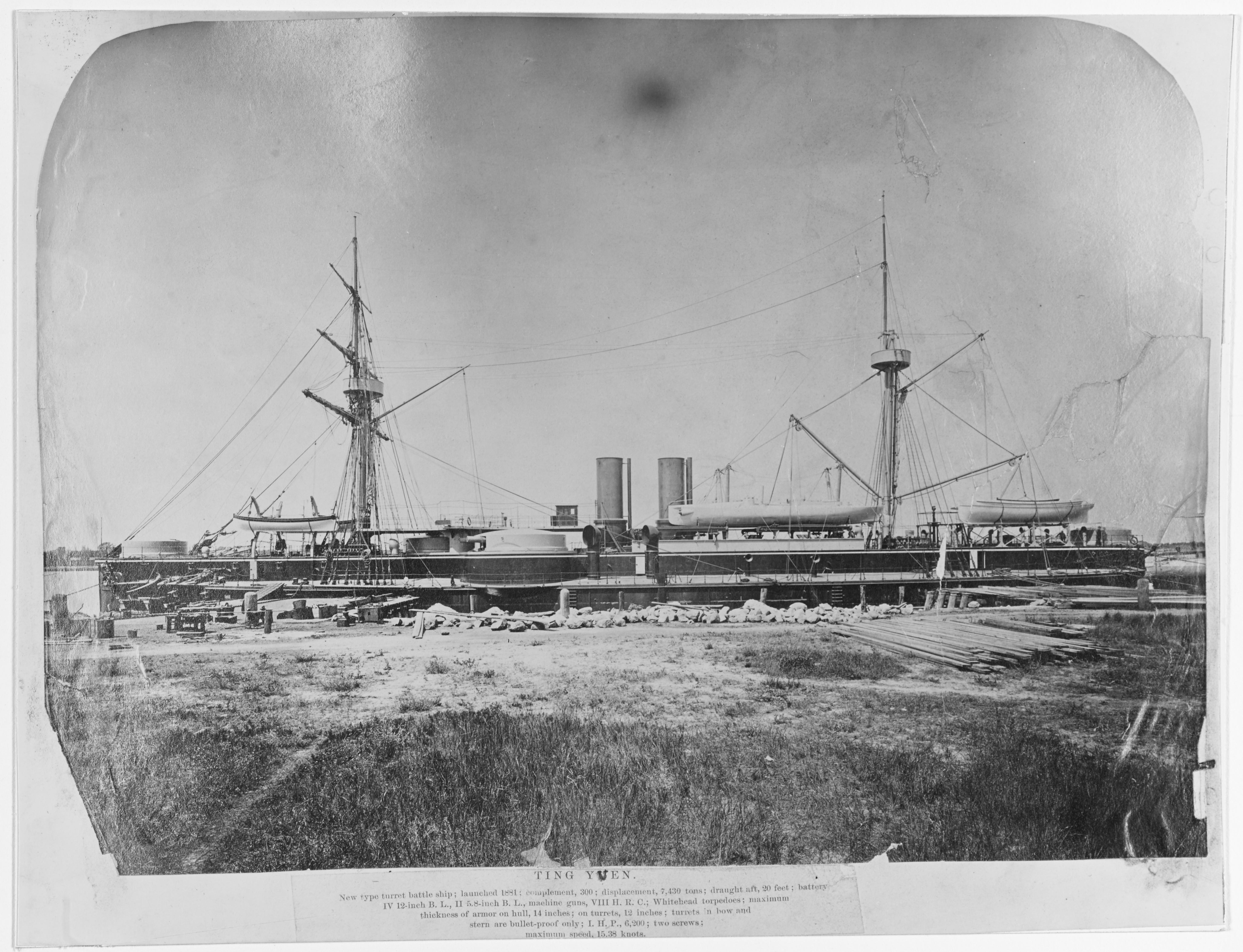
Dingyuan, the flagship of the Beiyang Fleet

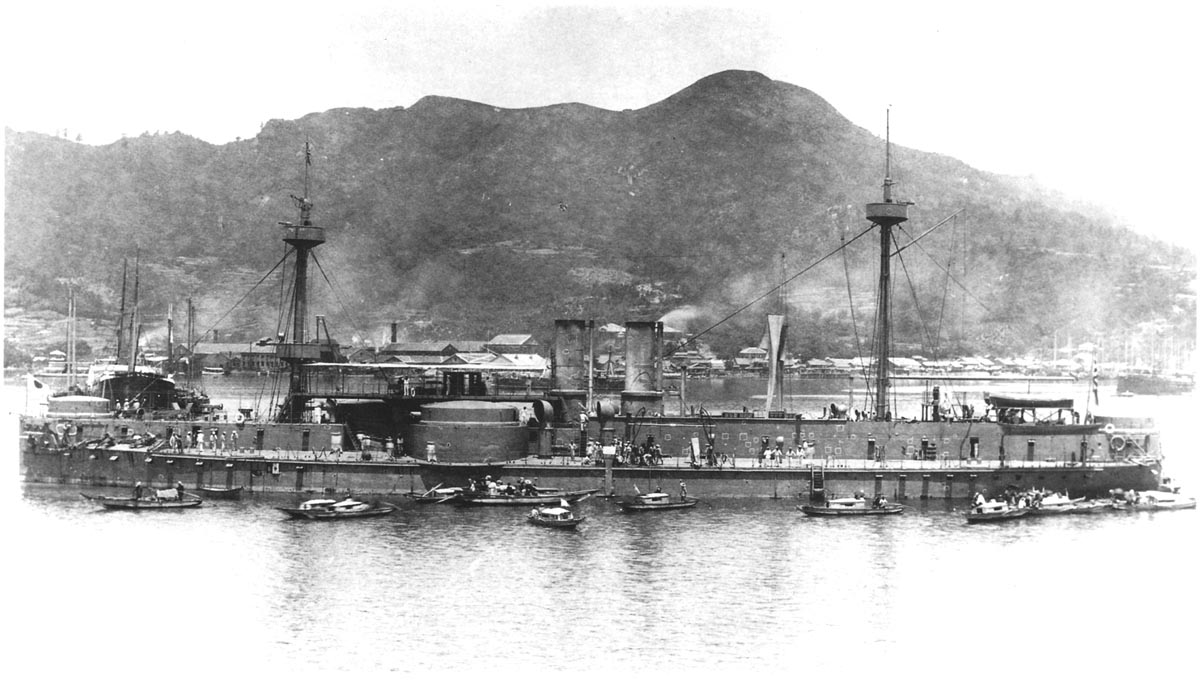
Zhenyuan

The Beiyang Fleet was one of the four modernised Chinese navies in the late Qing dynasty. The navies were heavily sponsored by Li Hongzhang, the Viceroy of Zhili who had also created the Huai Army. The Beiyang Fleet was the dominant navy in East Asia before the First Sino-Japanese War. The Japanese themselves were apprehensive about facing the Chinese fleet, especially the two German-built battleships – Dingyuan and Zhenyuan – to which the Japanese had no comparable counterparts. However, China's advantages were more apparent than real as most of the Chinese warships were over-age and obsolescent; the ships were also not maintained properly and indiscipline was common among their crews. The greater armour of major Chinese warships and the greater weight of broadside they could fire were more than offset by the number of quick-firing guns on most first-line Japanese warships, which gave the Japanese the edge in any sustained exchange of salvos. The worst feature of both Chinese battleships was actually their main armament; each was armed with short-barreled guns in twin barbettes mounted in echelon which could fire only in restricted arcs. The short barrels of the Chinese main armament meant that the shells had a low muzzle velocity and poor penetration, and their accuracy was also poor at long ranges.

Tactically, Chinese naval vessels entered the war with only the crudest set of instructions – ships that were assigned to designated pairs were to keep together and all ships were to fight end-on, as far forward from the beam as possible, a tactic dictated by the obsolescent arrangement of guns aboard Chinese warships. The only vague resemblance of a fleet tactic was that all ships were to follow the visible movements of the flagship, an arrangement made necessary because the signal book used by the Chinese was written in English, a language with which few officers in the Beiyang Fleet had any familiarity.

When it was first developed by Empress Dowager Cixi in 1888, the Beiyang Fleet was said to be the strongest navy in East Asia. Before her adopted son, the Guangxu Emperor, took over the throne in 1889, Cixi wrote out explicit orders that the navy should continue to develop and expand gradually. However, after Cixi went into retirement, all naval and military development came to a drastic halt. Japan's victories over China has often been falsely rumoured to be the fault of Cixi. Many believed that Cixi was the cause of the navy's defeat because Cixi embezzled funds from the navy to build the Summer Palace in Beijing. However, extensive research by Chinese historians revealed that Cixi was not the cause of the Chinese navy's decline. In actuality, China's defeat was caused by the Guangxu Emperor's lack of interest in developing and maintaining the military. His close adviser, Grand Tutor Weng Tonghe, advised Guangxu to cut all funding to the navy and army, because he did not see Japan as a true threat, and there were several natural disasters during the early 1890s which the emperor thought to be more pressing to expend funds on.

The total strength of the entire Imperial Chinese navy was:

- 2 battleships
- 1 coastal battleship (often labelled as an armoured cruiser)
- 5 unprotected cruisers
- 5 protected cruisers
- 1 auxiliary cruiser
- 7 small cruisers
- 4 torpedo gunboats
- 34 gunboats
- 28 small gunboats
- 30 torpedo boats
- 9 armed transports

=== Contemporaneous wars waged by the Qing ===
While the Qing was fighting the First Sino-Japanese War, it was also simultaneously engaging rebels in the Dungan Revolt in northwestern China, where thousands lost their lives. The generals Dong Fuxiang, Ma Anliang and Ma Haiyan were initially summoned by the Qing government to bring the Hui troops under their command to participate in the First Sino-Japanese War, but they were eventually sent to suppress the Dungan Revolt instead.

== Early stages ==
Operations of the First Sino-Japanese War and the subsequent Yiwei War

1 June 1894: The Donghak Rebel Army moves toward Seoul. The Korean government requests help from the Qing government to suppress the revolt.

6 June 1894: About 2,465 Chinese soldiers are transported to Korea to suppress the Donghak Rebellion. Japan asserts that it was not notified and thus China has violated the Convention of Tientsin, which requires that China and Japan must notify each other before intervening in Korea. China asserts that Japan was notified and approved of Chinese intervention.

8 June 1894: First of about 4,000 Japanese soldiers and 500 marines land at Chemulpo.

11 June 1894: Ceasefire during the Donghak Rebellion.

13 June 1894: The Japanese government telegraphs the commander of the Japanese forces in Korea, Ōtori Keisuke, to remain in Korea for as long as possible despite the end of the rebellion.

16 June 1894: Japanese foreign minister Mutsu Munemitsu meets with Wang Fengzao, the Qing ambassador to Japan, to discuss the future status of Korea. Wang states that the Qing government intends to pull out of Korea after the rebellion has been suppressed and expects Japan to do the same. However, China retains a resident to look after Chinese primacy in Korea.

22 June 1894: Additional Japanese troops arrive in Korea. Japanese prime minister Itō Hirobumi tells Matsukata Masayoshi that since the Qing Empire appear to be making military preparations, there is probably "no policy but to go to war". Mutsu tells Ōtori to press the Korean government on the Japanese demands.

26 June 1894: Ōtori presents a set of reform proposals to the Korean king Gojong. Gojong's government rejects the proposals and instead insists on troop withdrawals.

7 July 1894: Failure of mediation between China and Japan arranged by the British ambassador to China.

19 July 1894: Establishment of the Japanese Combined Fleet, consisting of almost all vessels in the Imperial Japanese Navy. Mutsu cables Ōtori to take any necessary steps to compel the Korean government to carry out a reform program.

23 July 1894: Japanese troops occupy Seoul, capture Gojong, and establish a new, pro-Japanese government, which terminates all Sino-Korean treaties and grants the Imperial Japanese Army the right to expel the Qing Empire's Beiyang Army from Korea.

25 July 1894: First battle of the war: the Battle of Pungdo / Hoto-oki kaisen

== Events during the war ==
=== Opening troop movements ===
By July 1894, Chinese forces in Korea numbered 3,000–3,500 and they were outnumbered by Japanese troops. They could only be supplied by sea through Asan Bay. The Japanese objective was first to blockade the Chinese at Asan and then encircle them with their land forces. Japan's initial strategy was to gain command of the sea, which was critical to its operations in Korea. Command of the sea would allow Japan to transport troops to the mainland. The army's Fifth Division would land at Chemulpo on the western coast of Korea, both to engage and push Chinese forces north-west up the peninsula and to draw the Beiyang Fleet into the Yellow Sea, where it would be engaged in decisive battle. Depending on the outcome of this engagement, Japan would make one of three choices. If the Combined Fleet were to win decisively, the larger part of the Japanese army would undertake immediate landings on the coast between Shan-hai-kuan and Tientsin to defeat the Chinese army and bring the war to a swift conclusion. If the engagement were to be a draw and neither side gained control of the sea, the army would concentrate on the occupation of Korea. Lastly, if the Combined Fleet was defeated and consequently lost command of the sea, the bulk of the army would remain in Japan and prepare to repel a Chinese invasion, while the Fifth Division in Korea would be ordered to hang on and fight a rearguard action.

=== Sinking of the Kowshing ===
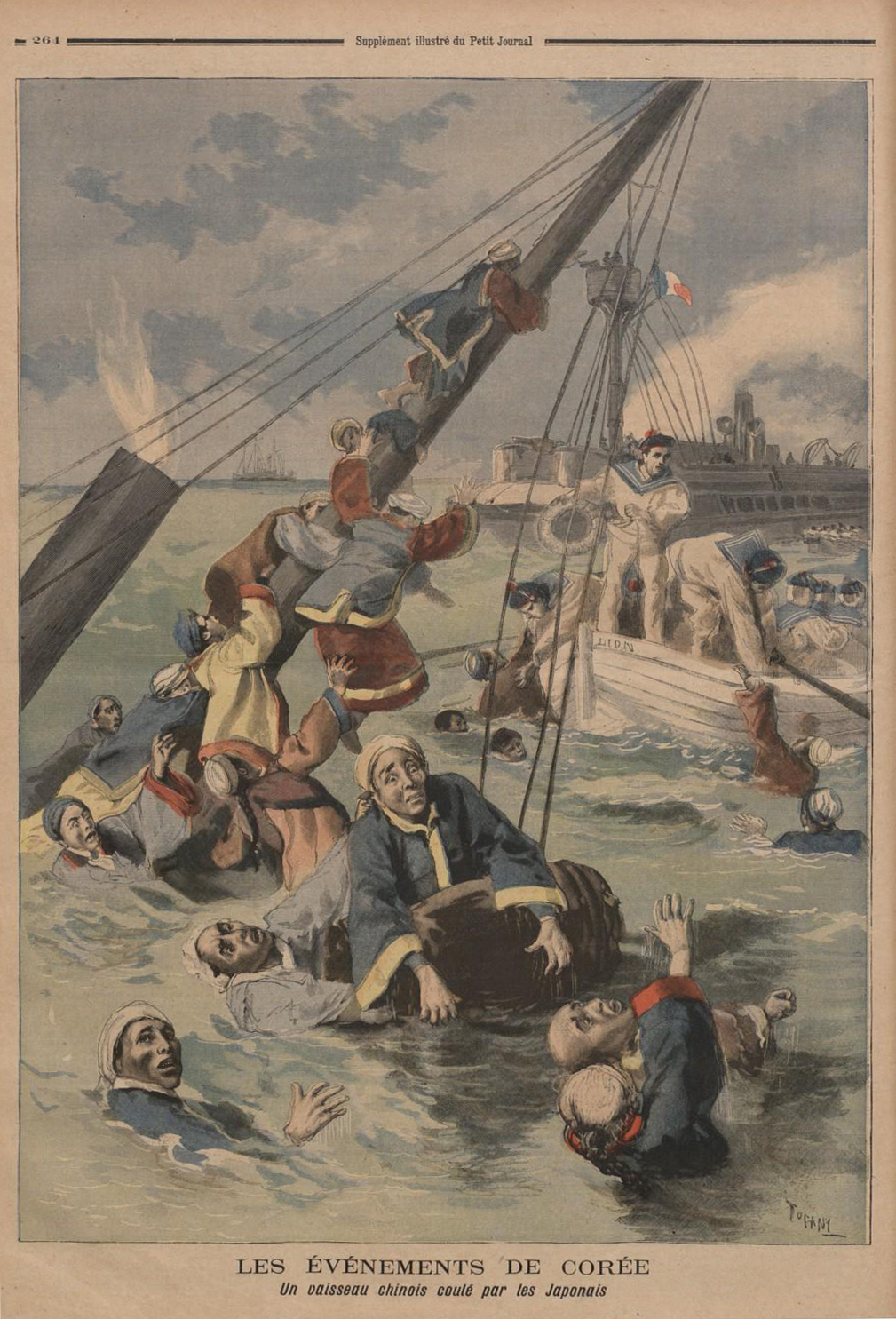
Depiction of the sinking of the Kowshing and the rescue of some of its crew by the French gunboat Le Lion, from the French periodical Le Petit Journal (1894)

On 25 July 1894, the cruisers Yoshino, Naniwa and Akitsushima of the Japanese flying squadron, which had been patrolling off Asan Bay, encountered the Chinese cruiser Jiyuan and gunboat Kwang-yi. These vessels had steamed out of Asan to meet the transport Kowshing, escorted by the Chinese gunboat Tsao-kiang. After an hour-long engagement, the Jiyuan escaped while the Kwang-yi grounded on rocks, where its powder magazine exploded.

The Kowshing was a 2,134-ton British merchant vessel owned by the Indochina Steam Navigation Company of London, commanded by Captain T. R. Galsworthy and crewed by 64 men. The ship was chartered by the Qing government to ferry troops to Korea, and was on her way to reinforce Asan with 1,100 troops plus supplies and equipment. A German artillery officer, Major von Hanneken, advisor to the Chinese, was also aboard. The ship was due to arrive on 25 July.

The Japanese cruiser Naniwa, under Captain Tōgō Heihachirō, intercepted the Kowshing and captured its escort. The Japanese then ordered the Kowshing to follow Naniwa and directed that Europeans be transferred to Naniwa. However, the 1,100 Chinese on board, desperate to return to Taku, threatened to kill the English captain, Galsworthy, and his crew. After four hours of negotiations, Captain Togo gave the order to fire upon the vessel. A torpedo missed, but a subsequent broadside hit the Kow Shing, which started to sink.

In the confusion, some of the Europeans escaped overboard, only to be fired upon by the Chinese. The Japanese rescued three of the British crew (the captain, first officer and quartermaster) and 50 Chinese, and took them to Japan. The sinking of the Kowshing almost caused a diplomatic incident between Japan and Britain, but the action was ruled in conformity with international law regarding the treatment of mutineers (the Chinese troops). Many observers considered the troops lost on board the Kowshing to have been the best the Chinese had.

The German gunboat Iltis rescued 150 Chinese, the French gunboat Le Lion rescued 43, and the British cruiser HMS Porpoise rescued an unknown number.

=== Fighting in southern Korea ===
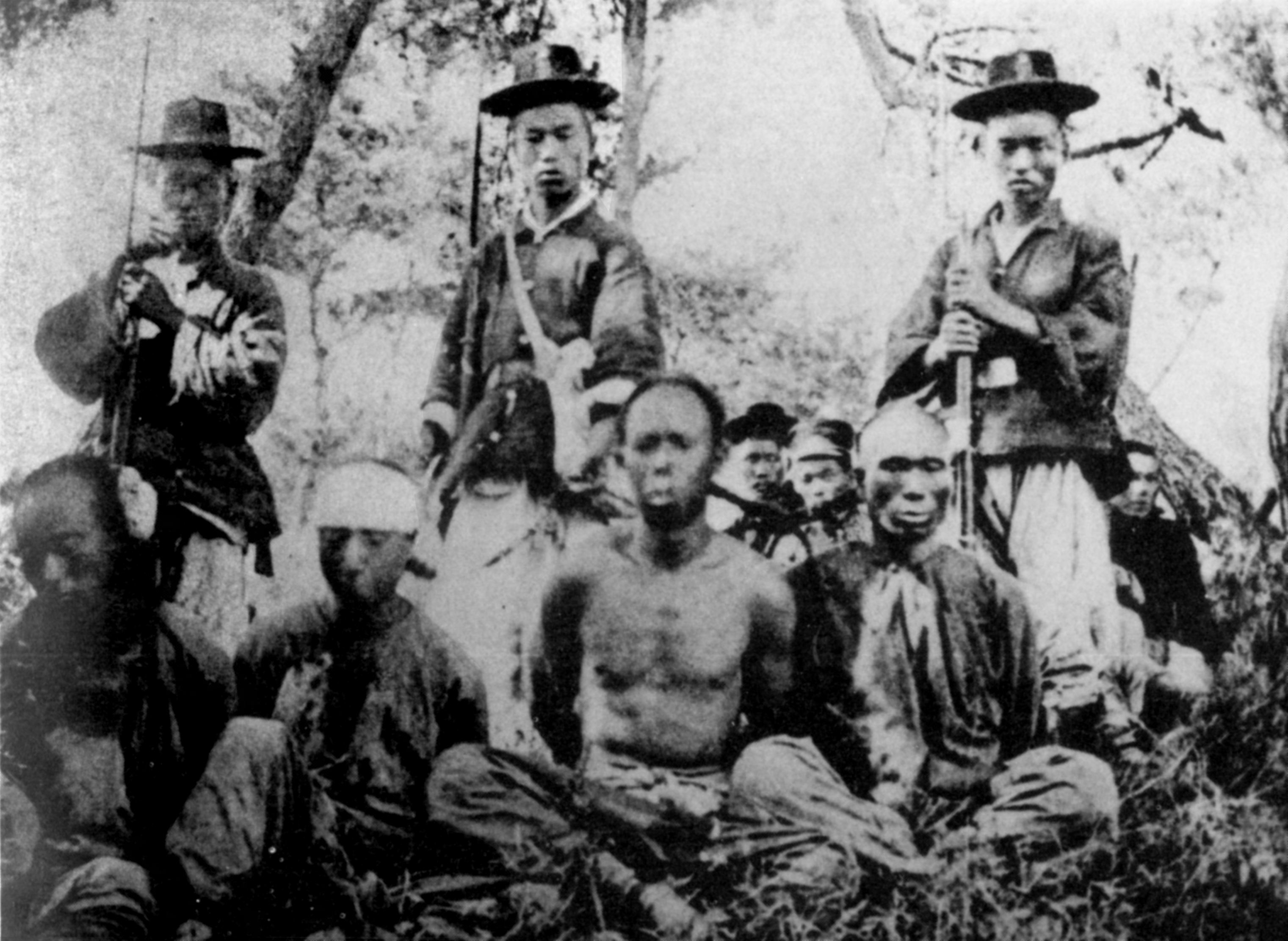
Korean soldiers and Chinese captives

Commissioned by the new pro-Japanese Korean government to forcibly expel Chinese forces, on 25 July Major-General Ōshima Yoshimasa led a mixed brigade numbering about 4,000 on a rapid forced march from Seoul south toward Asan Bay to face Chinese troops garrisoned at Seonghwan Station east of Asan and Kongju.

The Chinese forces stationed near Seonghwan under the command of General Ye Zhichao numbered about 3,880 men. They had anticipated the impending arrival of the Japanese by fortifying their position with trenches, earthworks including six redoubts protected by abatis and by the flooding of surrounding rice fields. But expected Chinese reinforcements had been lost on board the British-chartered transport Kowshing. Units of the Chinese main force were deployed east and northeast of Asan, near the main road leading to Seoul; the key positions held by the Chinese were the towns of Seonghwan and Cheonan. Approximately 3,000 troops were stationed at Seonghwan, while 1,000 men along with General Ye Zhichao were at headquarters at Cheonan. The remaining Chinese troops were stationed in Asan itself. The Chinese had been preparing for a pincer movement against the Korean capital by massing troops at Pyongyang in the north and Asan in the south.

On the morning of 27–28 July 1894, the two forces met just outside Asan in an engagement that lasted till 07:30 the next morning. The battle began with a diversionary attack by Japanese troops, followed by the main attack which quickly outflanked the Chinese defences. The Chinese troops, witnessing that they were being outflanked, left their defensive positions and fled towards the direction of Asan. The Chinese gradually lost ground to the superior Japanese numbers, and finally broke and fled towards Pyongyang abandoning arms, ammunition and all their artillery. The Japanese took the city of Asan on 29 July, breaking the Chinese encirclement of Seoul. The Chinese suffered 500 killed and wounded while the Japanese suffered 88 casualties. General Ye Zhichao reported to the Emperor that he had in fact won the battle and caused over 2,000 casualties to the Japanese forces, for which his army was rewarded with 20,000 taels. He then reported later that 20,000 Japanese attacked him and he inflicted a further 1,500 casualties to his 300 losses and the strategic situation compelled him to withdraw to Pyongyang where en route he inflicted a further 1,500 casualties. Ye's reports of the battle of Seonghwan were received in Beijing in August over a month after the battle occurred, an indication of the lack of proper systems of communication within the Qing army.

=== Declaration of War ===
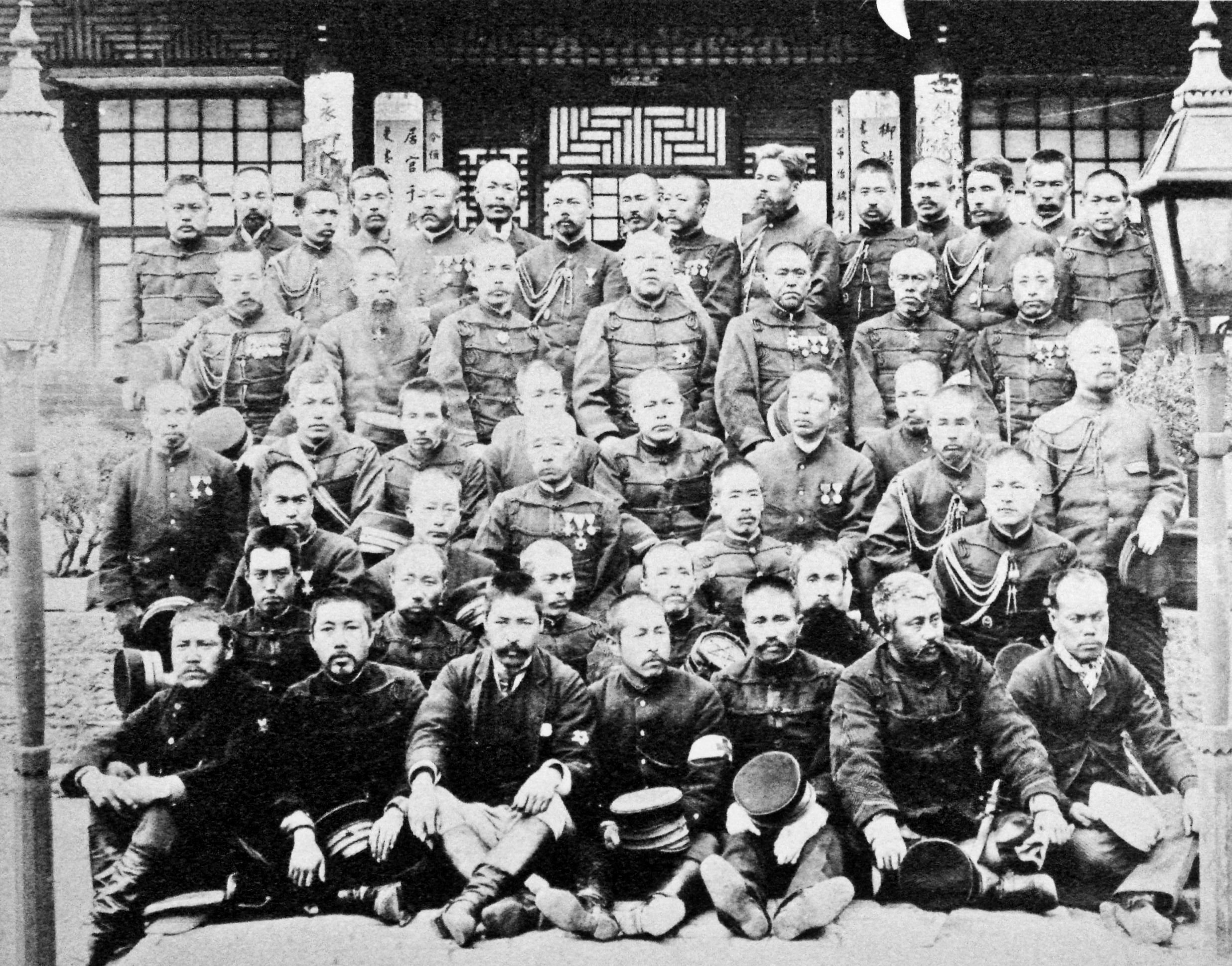
Japanese soldiers of the First Sino-Japanese War, 1895

On 1 August 1894, war was officially declared between China and Japan. The rationale, language and tone given by the rulers of both nations in their respective declarations of war were markedly different.

The tenor of the Japanese declaration of war, issued in the name of the Meiji Emperor, appears to have had at least one eye fixed on the wider international community using phrases such as 'Family of Nations', the 'Law of Nations' and making additional references to international treaties. This was in sharp contrast to the Chinese approach to foreign relations which historically was noted for refusing to treat with other nations on an equal diplomatic footing, and instead insistent on such foreign powers paying tribute to the Chinese Emperor as vassals. In keeping with the traditional Chinese approach to its neighbours, the Chinese declaration of war stated the palpable disdain for the Japanese can be surmised from the repeated use of the term Wojen which translates to 'dwarf', an ancient intentionally offensive and highly derogative term for the Japanese.

This use of the pejorative to describe a foreign nation was not unusual for Chinese official documents of the time – so much so that a major bone of contention between Imperial China and the Treaty Powers of the day had previously been the habitual use of the Chinese character 夷 ('Yi'...which literally meant 'barbarian'), to refer to those termed otherwise as 'foreign devils' typically describing those powers occupying the treaty ports. The use of the term 'Yi' (夷) by Chinese Imperial officials had in fact been considered so provocative by the Treaty Powers that the collective bundle of accords known as the Treaty of Tientsin negotiated in 1858 to end the Second Opium War explicitly proscribed the Chinese Imperial Court from using the term 'Yi' to refer to officials, subjects, or citizens of the belligerent powers, the signatories seemingly feeling it necessary to extract this specific demand from the Xianfeng Emperor's representatives. In the thirty-five years elapsing since the Treaty of Tientsin, however, the language of the Chinese Emperors would appear to change little with regards to its neighbour Japan.

=== Battle of Pyongyang ===
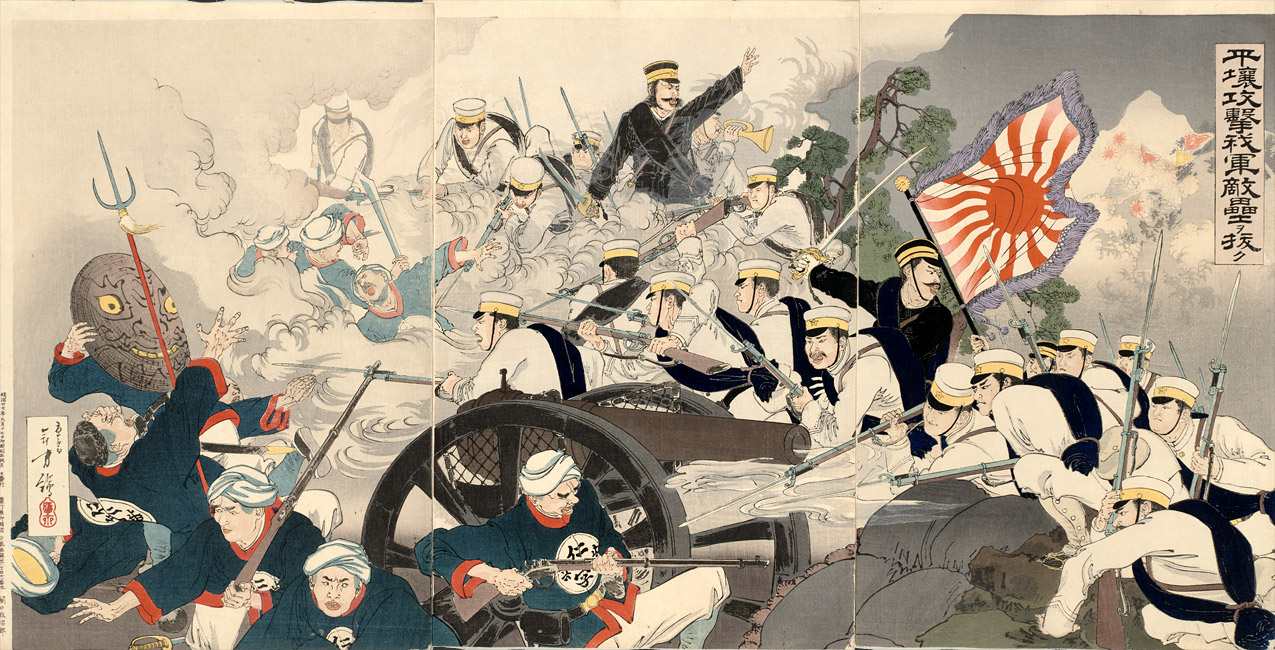
The Battle of Pyongyang.

After the initial fighting further to the south in July 1894, the Chinese ground forces focused on holding Pyongyang, beyond which there were no other defensible positions until the Yalu River, the border between Korea and China. The city was near a river to the south and east, mountains to the north, and was surrounded by walls. The Qing deployed 13,000 troops there from China, and the defenders spent almost two months preparing fortifications after they arrived in the city on 4 August, including 27 forts. The Chinese were planning to use Pyongyang as their headquarters from where they would retake the rest of the Korean peninsula. The Qing forces in the city had a large quantity of modern equipment, and some of their best troops.

At 04:30 on 15 September, the Imperial Japanese Army converged on the city of Pyongyang from four directions, with a total of 23,800 troops. They launched an artillery barrage from the east and a feint from the south as a diversion from the main attack, coming from the north, which was the easiest direction to approach from. The Chinese put up a strong resistance, and it was some of the fiercest fighting of the war, but they did not fire on Japanese troops crossing the river and were not expecting another attack from the north. Once the Japanese entered the city, the defenders were defeated and the survivors fled, being attacked by a separate Japanese force as they retreated. The Japanese captured 35 artillery pieces, hundreds of rifles, and ammunition. The troops led by the Chinese Hui Muslim general Zuo Baogui notably fought well, until he was killed in action by Japanese artillery.

Taking advantage of heavy rainfall overnight, the remaining Chinese troops escaped Pyongyang and headed northeast toward the coastal city of Uiju. In the early morning of 16 September, the entire Japanese army entered Pyongyang.

=== Defeat of the Beiyang fleet ===
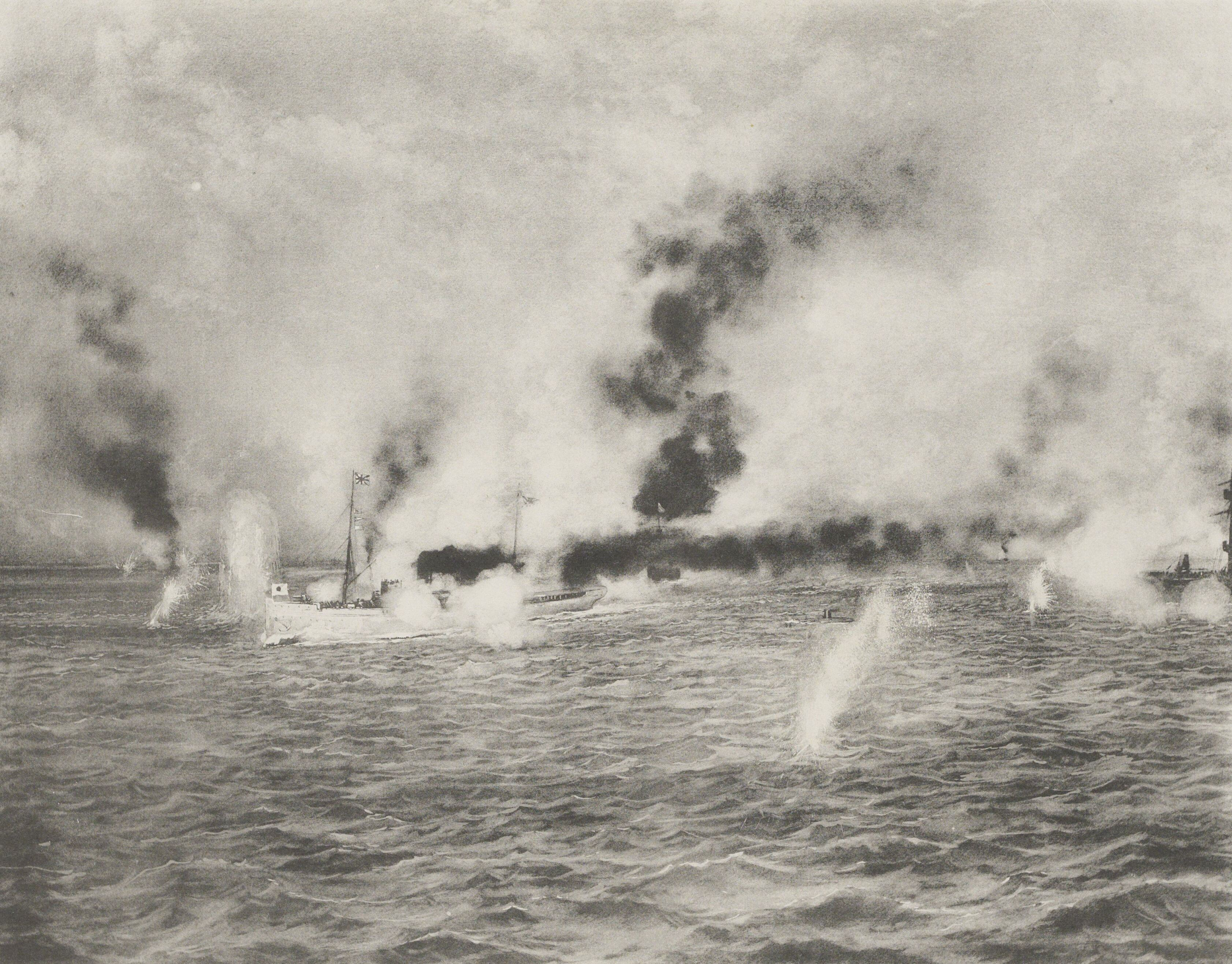
The Battle of the Yalu River

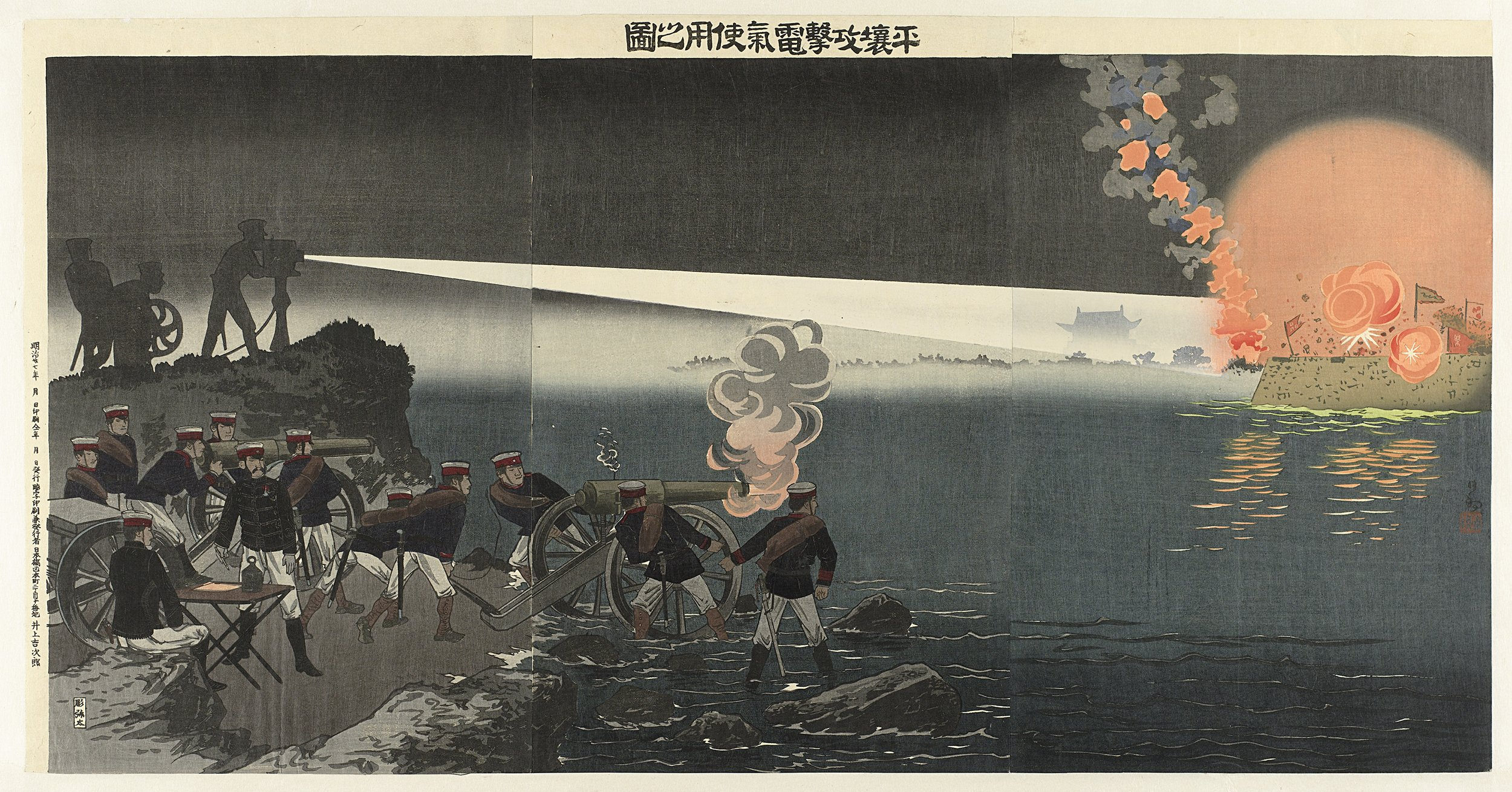
Japanese attack on Pyongyang, Korea. Colour woodcut shows the Japanese army using a searchlight to locate its target.

In early September, Li Hongzhang decided to reinforce the Chinese forces at Pyongyang by employing the Beiyang fleet to escort transports to the mouth of the Taedong River. About 4,500 additional troops stationed in the Zhili were to be redeployed. On 12 September, half of the troops embarked at Dagu on five specially chartered transports and headed to Dalian where two days later on 14 September, they were joined by another 2,000 soldiers. Initially, Admiral Ding wanted to send the transports under a light escort with only a few ships, while the main force of the Beiyang Fleet would locate and operate directly against the Combined Fleet to prevent the Japanese from intercepting the convoy. But the appearance of the Japanese cruisers Yoshino and Naniwa on a reconnaissance sortie near Weihaiwei thwarted these plans. The Chinese had mistaken them for the main Japanese fleet. Consequently, on 12 September, the entire Beiyang Fleet departed Dalian heading for Weihaiwei, arriving near the Shandong Peninsula the next day. The Chinese warships spent the entire day cruising the area, waiting for the Japanese. However, since there was no sighting of the Japanese fleet, Admiral Ding decided to return to Dalian, reaching the port in the morning of 15 September. As Japanese troops moved north to attack Pyongyang, Admiral Itō correctly guessed that the Chinese would attempt to reinforce their army in Korea by sea. On 14 September, the Combined Fleet steamed northwards to search the Korean and Chinese coasts to bring the Beiyang Fleet to battle.

The Japanese victory at Pyongyang had succeeded in pushing Chinese troops north to the Yalu River, in the process removing all effective Chinese military presence on the Korean Peninsula. Shortly before the convoy's departure, Admiral Ding received a message concerning the battle at Pyongyang informing him about the defeat. Subsequently, it made the redeployment of the troops to the mouth of the Taedong river unnecessary. Admiral Ding then correctly assumed that the next Chinese line of defence would be established on the Yalu River, and decided to redeploy the embarked soldiers there. On 16 September, the convoy of five transport ships departed from Dalian Bay under escort from the vessels of the Beiyang Fleet which included the two ironclad battleships Dingyuan and Zhenyuan. Reaching the mouth of the Yalu River, the transports disembarked the troops, and the landing operation lasted until the following morning.

On 17 September 1894, the Japanese Combined Fleet encountered the Chinese Beiyang Fleet off the mouth of the Yalu River. The naval battle, which lasted from late morning to dusk, resulted in a Japanese victory. Although the Chinese were able to land 4,500 troops near the Yalu River by sunset the Beiyang fleet was near the point of total collapse – most of the fleet had fled or had been sunk and the two largest ships Dingyuan and Zhenyuan were nearly out of ammunition. The Imperial Japanese Navy destroyed eight of the ten Chinese warships, assuring Japan's command of the Yellow Sea. The principal factor in the Japanese victory was its superiority in speed and firepower. The victory shattered the morale of the Chinese naval forces. The Battle of the Yalu River was the largest naval engagement of the war and was a major propaganda victory for Japan.

=== Invasion of Manchuria ===
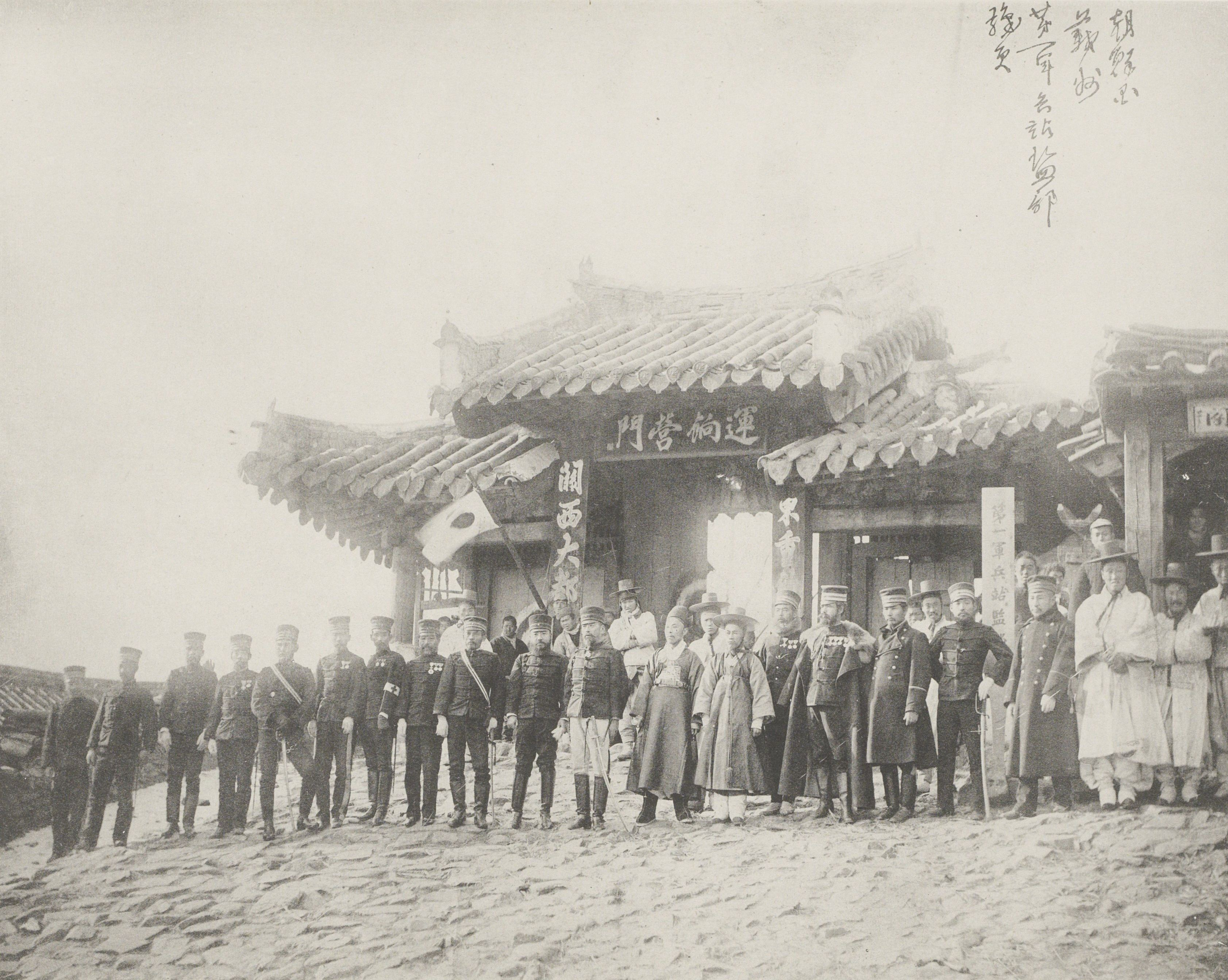
Japanese military leaders and local Korean officiers before a depot of supplies in Uiju, Korea, near the boarder with Manchuria

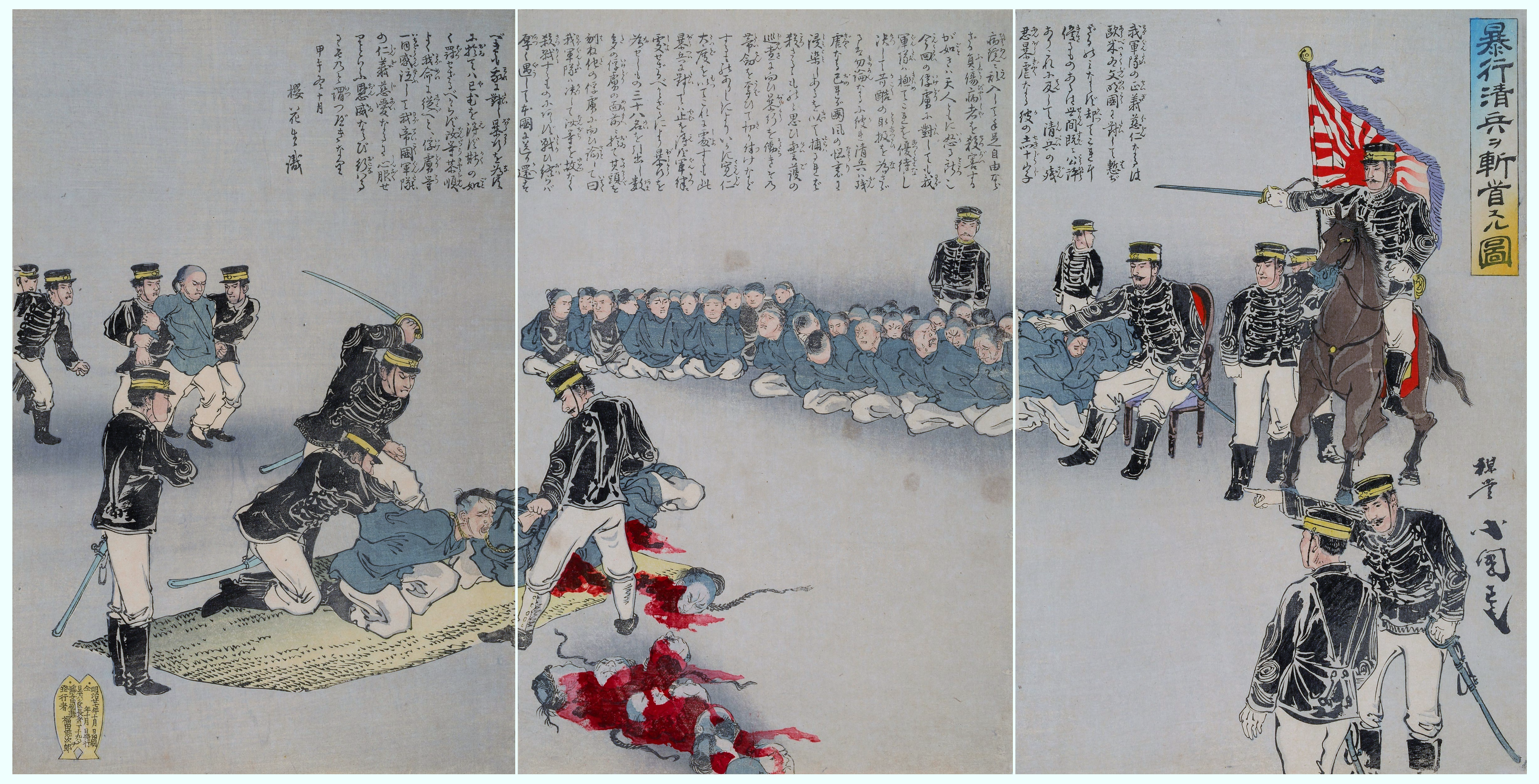
An illustration by Utagawa Kokunimasa of Japanese soldiers beheading 38 Chinese POWs as a warning to others

After taking Pyongyang and defeating the Chinese fleet near the Yalu River, the Japanese focused on capturing China's two naval bases guarding the approaches to the Qing capital: Port Arthur on the Liaodong Peninsula in northeast China (Manchuria), and Weihaiwei on the Shandong Peninsula, one on each side of the entrance to the Bohai Sea. Another force would capture Mukden, the main city in Manchuria. This plan included landing additional troops by ship near both naval bases, while the forces in Korea would march into Manchuria from the Korean border. After taking these objectives, the Imperial Japanese Army could make a pincer movement on Beijing.

With the defeat at Pyongyang, the Chinese abandoned northern Korea and took up defensive positions in fortifications along their side of the Yalu River at Jiuliancheng, with additional fortifications being built along the river bank to the north and to the south. The best equipped Chinese troops, the Huai Army, had been used for the defence of Korea, and after their defeat the Qing government had to deploy additional units to defend Manchuria, such as the partially-reformed Green Standard Army. The Chinese force at Jiuliancheng was commanded by General Song Qing.

The Japanese First Army under General Aritomo Yamagata marched from Pyongyang and arrived at the Yalu River on 23 October. On the 24th, the Japanese successfully crossed the Yalu River, undetected, by using a pontoon bridge. Yamagata planned to first attack the Chinese at Hushan, to the north of Jiuliancheng, to distract the defenders before then launching his main attack at their center in Jiuliancheng. The following afternoon of 25 October, they successfully captured Hushan, and intended to attack Jiuliancheng the next morning, but when they arrived there the Japanese found that the defenders had fled. The entire line of fortifications along the Yalu River, from Hushan to Andong in the south, had been abandoned by the Chinese by the 26th. They first withdrew to Fenghuangcheng, before abandoning that city on 30 October as the Japanese pursued them. The Japanese occupied it, and on 15 November they captured Xiuyan, a town west of Fenghuangcheng. After the Japanese established control over the border region, they planned on moving south along the coast to take Port Arthur and other towns in the area (including Jinzhou and Dalian), so they could land more troops. Song Qing's forces retreated in the opposite direction, toward Mukden, because it was the homeland of Manchus and had symbolic importance for the Qing dynasty. The Japanese Second Army under General Ōyama Iwao arrived by ship near the peninsula on 24 October in preparation to advance on Port Arthur.

=== Fall of Lüshunkou ===
By 21 November 1894, the Japanese had taken the city of Lüshunkou (Port Arthur) with minimal resistance and suffering minimal casualties. Describing their motives as having encountered a display of the mutilated remains of Japanese soldiers as they invaded the town, Japanese forces proceeded with the unrestrained killing of civilians during the Port Arthur Massacre with unconfirmed estimates in the thousands. This event was at the time widely viewed with scepticism, as the world at large was still in disbelief that the Japanese were capable of such deeds – it seemed more likely to have been exaggerated propagandist fabrications of a Chinese government to discredit Japanese hegemony. In reality, the Chinese government itself was unsure how to react and initially denied the occurrence of the loss of Port Arthur to the Japanese altogether.

As we entered the town of Port Arthur, we saw the head of a Japanese soldier displayed on a wooden stake. This filled us with rage and a desire to crush any Chinese soldier. Anyone we saw in the town, we killed. The streets were filled with corpses, so many they blocked our way. We killed people in their homes; by and large, there wasn't a single house without from three to six dead. Blood was flowing and the smell was awful. We sent out search parties. We shot some, hacked at others. The Chinese troops just dropped their arms and fled. Firing and slashing, it was unbounded joy. At this time, our artillery troops were at the rear, giving three cheers [banzai] for the emperor.

— Makio Okabe, diary

By 10 December 1894, Kaipeng (present-day Gaizhou) fell to the Japanese First Army. That same month, Nozu Michitsura was given command of the First Army, replacing Yamagata who had fallen ill.

=== Fall of Weihaiwei ===
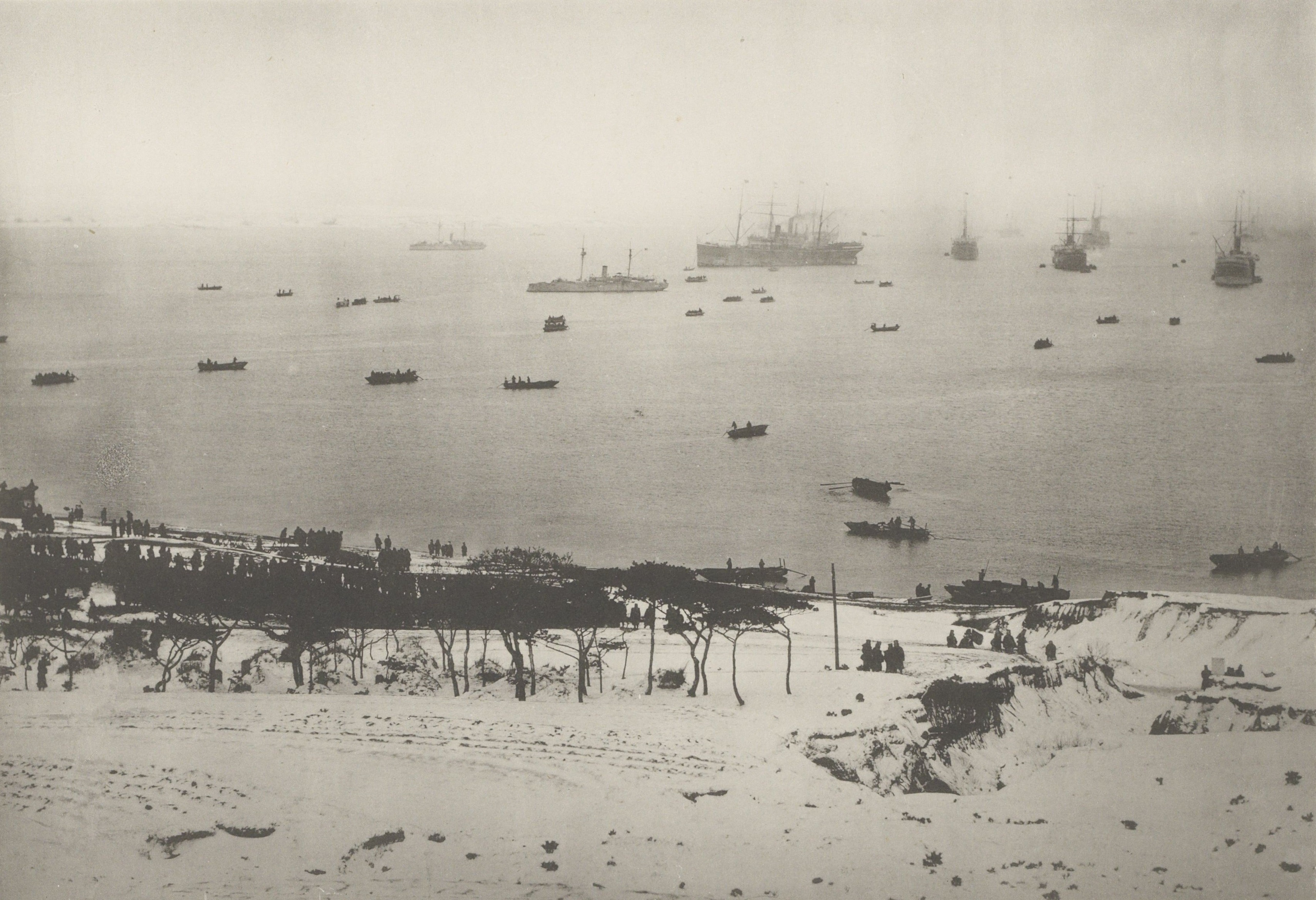
Japanese Army landing at Shuilong Bay, Rongcheng, Shandong in January, 1895

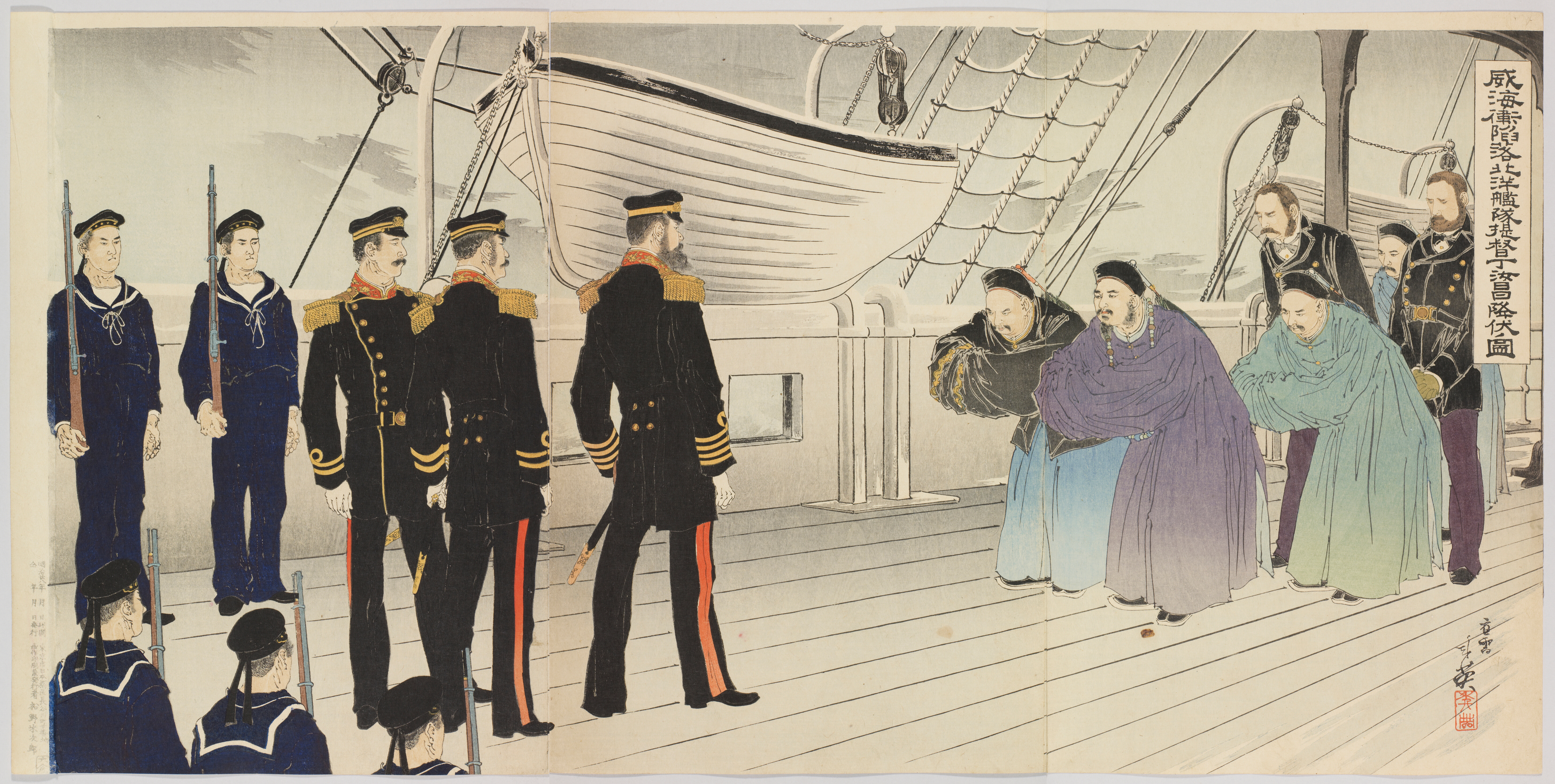
Revisionist depiction of Chinese delegation, led by Admiral Ding Ruchang and their foreign advisors, boarding the Japanese vessel to negotiate the surrender with Admiral Itō Sukeyuki after the Battle of Weihaiwei. In reality, Ding had committed suicide after his defeat, and never surrendered.

The Chinese fleet subsequently retreated behind the Weihaiwei fortifications. However, it was then surprised by Japanese ground forces, who outflanked the harbour's defences in coordination with the navy. The Battle of Weihaiwei was a 23-day siege with the major land and naval engagements taking place between 20 January and 12 February 1895. Historian Jonathan Spence notes that "the Chinese admiral retired his fleet behind a protective curtain of contact mines and took no further part in the fighting." The Japanese commander marched his forces over the Shandong peninsula and reached the landward side of Weihaiwei, where the siege was eventually successful for the Japanese.

=== Advance in Manchuria and peace talks ===
After Weihaiwei's fall on 12 February 1895, and an easing of harsh winter conditions, Japanese troops pressed further into southern Manchuria and northern China. Two Chinese officials had been appointed by the Qing imperial court two months earlier and were sent to meet with Japanese representatives to inquire about peace terms. After some delay they arrived in late January, but the Japanese did not consider them to have enough credentials and noted that they had not been empowered by their government to make decisions. On 2 February 1895, the envoys were told by the Japanese government that their peace mission was not considered to be serious. After the failed talks, Japanese troops of General Katsura Tarō's 3rd Division fought off a Chinese attempt to liberate the city of Haicheng on 16 February, and then went on to capture Liaoyang on 4 March and Yingkou on 6 March. This left no more Chinese forces between the Japanese and the Shanhai Pass, which connected Manchuria to Zhili, giving them control over the approaches to Tianjin and Beijing.

In late February the Qing government appointed Li Hongzhang as ambassador extraordinary to open peace talks with Japan, and the Japanese accepted this on 4 March, because he was seen as the leading Chinese statesman. Li and his delegation arrived in Shimonoseki, Japan, on the 19th and were met by the Japanese prime minister and foreign minister, Itō Hirobumi and Mutsu Munemitsu. The Chinese request for an armistice was rejected because the conditions that the Japanese insisted for it were unacceptable, and Li was informed that a Japanese invasion force was on its way to Taiwan. On 24 March, after leaving a meeting, Li was shot and injured by a Japanese nationalist. The incident caused international outrage from the Western press and led to the Meiji Emperor issuing a statement to show his grief and regret. An armistice in Manchuria and north China was agreed to on 30 March 1895, and negotiations for the final treaty continued for another three weeks.

=== Occupation of the Pescadores Islands ===
Even before the peace negotiations were set to begin at Shimonoseki, the Japanese had begun preparations for the capture of Taiwan. However, the first operation would be directed not against the island itself, but against the Pescadores Islands, which due to their strategic position off the west coast would become a stepping stone for further operations against the island. On 6 March, a Japanese expeditionary force consisting of a reinforced infantry regiment with 2,800 troops and an artillery battery were embarked on five transports, and sailed from Ujina to Sasebo, arriving there three days later. On 15 March, the five transports, escorted by seven cruisers and five torpedo boats of the 4th Flotilla, left Sasebo heading south. The Japanese fleet arrived at the Pescadores during the night of 20 March, but encountered stormy weather. Due to the poor weather, the landings were postponed until 23 March, when the weather cleared.

On the morning 23 March, the Japanese warships began the bombardment of the Chinese positions around the port of Lizhangjiao. A fort guarding the harbour was quickly silenced. At about midday, the Japanese troops began their landing. Unexpectedly, when the landing operation was underway, the guns of the fort once again opened fire, which caused some confusion among the Japanese troops. But they were soon silenced again after being shelled by the Japanese cruisers. By 14:00, Lizhangjiao was under Japanese control. After reinforcing the captured positions, the following morning, Japanese troops marched on the main town of Magong. The Chinese offered token resistance and after a short skirmish they abandoned their positions, retreating to nearby Xiyu Island. At 11:30, the Japanese entered Magong, but as soon as they had taken the coastal forts in the town, they were fired upon by the Chinese coastal battery on Xiyu Island. The barrage went unanswered until nightfall, as the Chinese had destroyed all the guns at Magong before they retreated, and Japanese warships feared entering the strait between the Penghu and Xiyu Islands due to the potential threat posed by mines. However, it caused no serious casualties among the Japanese forces. During the night, a small naval gunnery crew of 30 managed to make one of the guns of the Magong coastal battery operational. At dawn, the gun began shelling the Chinese positions on Xiyu, but the Chinese guns did not respond. Subsequently, the Japanese crossed the narrow strait, reaching Xiyu, discovering that the Chinese troops had abandoned their positions during the night and escaped on board local vessels.

The Japanese warships entered the strait the next day and, upon discovering that there were no mine fields, they entered Magong harbour. By 26 March, all the islands of the archipelago were under Japanese control, and Rear Admiral Tanaka Tsunatsune was appointed governor. During the campaign the Japanese lost 28 killed and wounded, while the Chinese losses were almost 350 killed or wounded and nearly 1,000 taken prisoner. This operation effectively prevented Chinese forces in Taiwan from being reinforced, and allowed the Japanese to press their demand for the cession of Taiwan in the peace negotiations.

== End of the war ==
=== Treaty of Shimonoseki ===
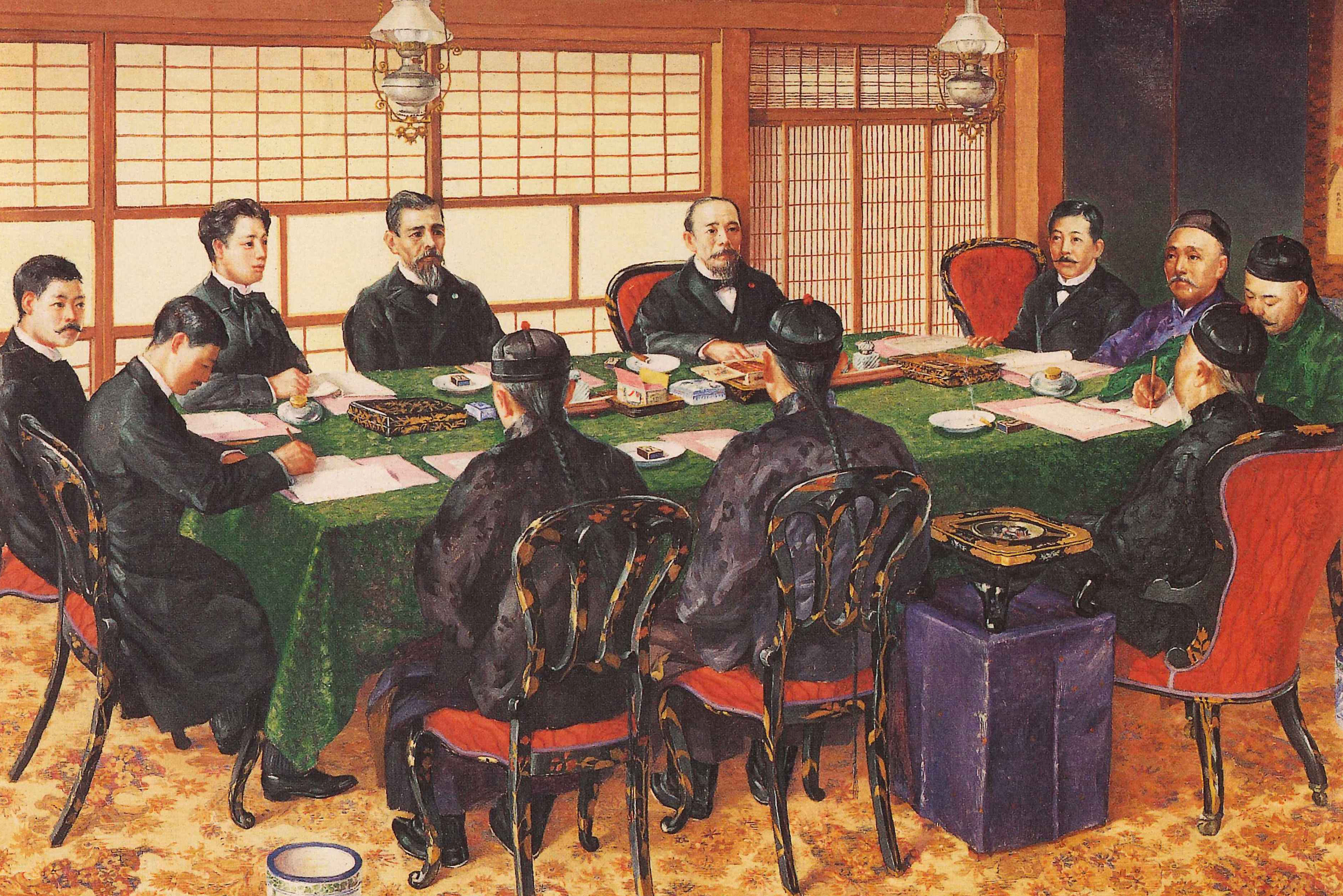
Sino-Japanese Peace Negotiations at Shimonoseki

The Treaty of Shimonoseki was signed on 17 April 1895. China recognised the total independence of Korea and ceded the Liaodong Peninsula, Taiwan, and the Penghu Islands to Japan "in perpetuity". The disputed islands known as "Senkaku/Diaoyu" islands were not named by this treaty, but Japan annexed these uninhabited islands to Okinawa Prefecture in 1895. Japan asserts this move was taken independently of the treaty ending the war, and China asserts that they were implied as part of the cession of Taiwan.

Additionally, China was to pay Japan 200 million taels (8,000,000 kg/17,600,000 lb) of silver as war reparations. The Qing government also signed a commercial treaty permitting Japanese ships to operate on the Yangtze River, to operate manufacturing factories in treaty ports and to open four more ports to foreign trade. Russia, Germany and France in a few days made the Triple Intervention, however, and forced Japan to give up the Liaodong Peninsula in exchange for another 30 million taels of silver (equivalent to about 450 million yen).

After the war, the Qing government paid 200 million Kuping taels, or 311,072,865 yen, making the war a net profit for Japan, as their war fund was only 250,000,000 yen.

=== Japanese invasion of Taiwan ===
"The cession of the island to Japan was received with such disfavour by the Chinese inhabitants that a large military force was required to effect its occupation. For nearly two years afterwards, a bitter guerrilla resistance was offered to the Japanese troops, and large forces – over 100,000 men, it was stated at the time – were required for its suppression. This was not accomplished without much cruelty on the part of the conquerors, who, in their march through the island, perpetrated all the worst excesses of war. They had, undoubtedly, considerable provocation. They were constantly ambushed by enemies, and their losses from battle and disease far exceeded the entire loss of the whole Japanese army throughout the Manchurian campaign. But their revenge was often taken on innocent villagers. Men, women, and children were ruthlessly slaughtered or became the victims of unrestrained lust and rapine. The result was to drive from their homes thousands of industrious and peaceful peasants, who, long after the main resistance had been completely crushed, continued to wage a vendetta war, and to generate feelings of hatred which the succeeding years of conciliation and good government have not wholly eradicated." – The Cambridge Modern History, Volume 12

Several Qing officials in Taiwan resolved to resist the cession of Taiwan to Japan under the Treaty of Shimonoseki, and on 23 May declared the island to be an independent Republic of Formosa. On 29 May, Japanese forces under Admiral Kabayama Sukenori landed in northern Taiwan, and in a five-month campaign defeated the Republican forces and occupied the island's main towns. The campaign effectively ended on 21 October 1895, with the flight of Liu Yongfu, the second Republican president, and the surrender of the Republican capital Tainan.

== Aftermath ==
=== In Japan ===
The First Sino-Japanese War was the turning point at which Japan shifted from a ‘suppressed nation’ to a ‘nation that suppresses others.’ Thus, in modern Japanese history, it was an epoch-making war, possessing a significance comparable to that of the Second World War.

— First Sino-Japanese War: The Transition Point of Modern History of East Asia (日清戦争: 東アジア近代史の転換点), Fujimura Michio (藤村道生)

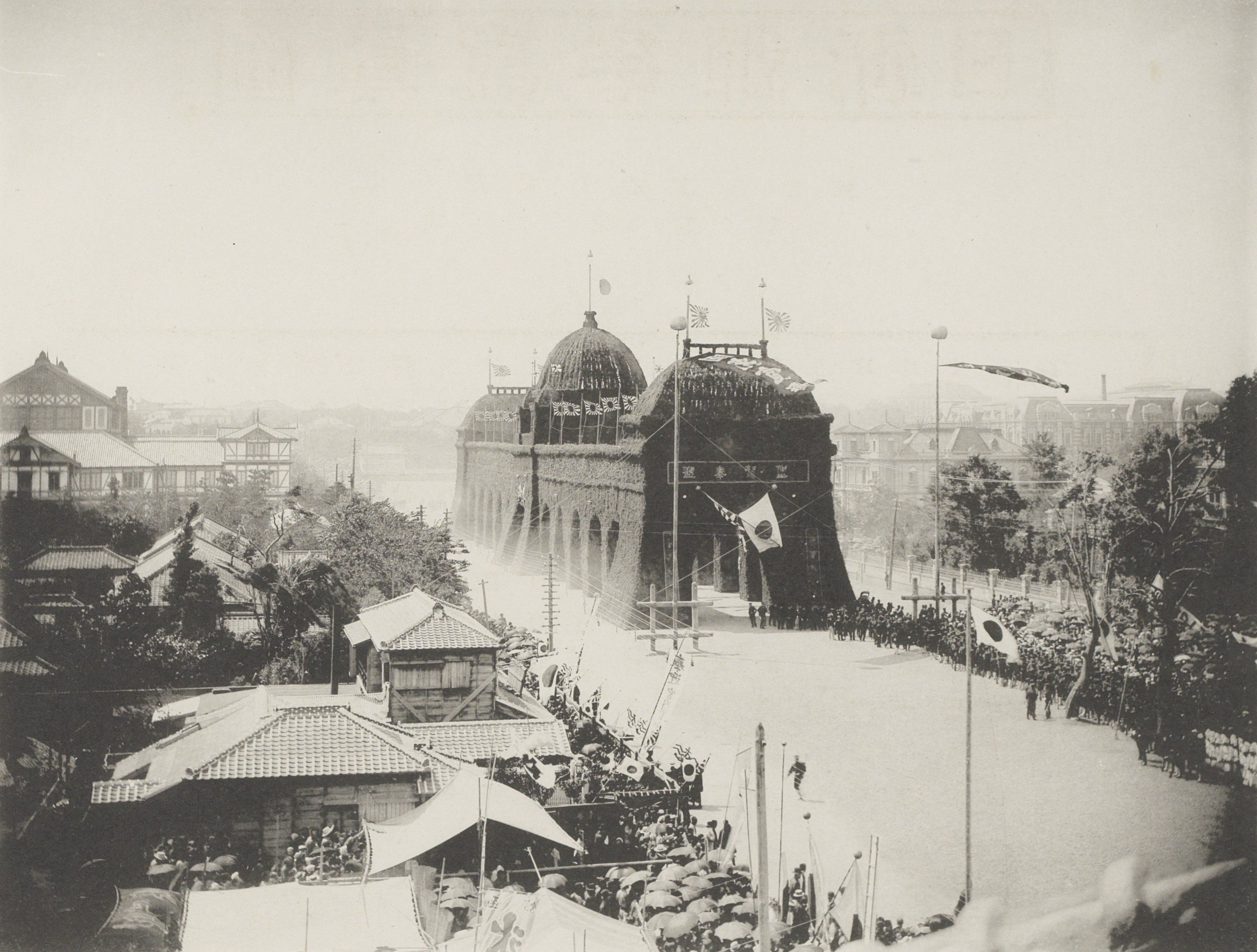
The triumphal arch at Hibiya in Tokyo, 30 May 1895

The Japanese success during the war was the result of the modernisation and industrialisation embarked upon two decades earlier. The war demonstrated the superiority of Japanese tactics and training from the adoption of a Western-style military. The Imperial Japanese Army and Imperial Japanese Navy inflicted a string of defeats on the Chinese through foresight, endurance, strategy and power of organisation. Japan's prestige rose in the eyes of the world, and the victory reflected the success of the Meiji Restoration. Japan suffered only a small loss of lives and treasure in return for the dominance of Taiwan, the Pescadores, and the Liaotung Peninsula in China. Its decisions of abandoning the policy of isolation and learning advanced policy from Western countries also became a good example for other Asian countries to follow. As a result of the war, Japan started to have equal status with the Western powers, and its victory established Japan as the dominant power in Asia, (Note: "A new balance of power had emerged. China's millennia-long regional dominance had abruptly ended. Japan had become the pre-eminent power of Asia, a position it would retain throughout the twentieth century". Paine, The Sino-Japanese War of 1894–1895: Perception, Power, and Primacy.) with them gaining several much needed resources such as iron for their continued modernisation and expansion. It also heightened Japanese ambitions of aggression and military expansion in Asia. Because Japan had benefited a lot from the treaty, it stimulated Japanese ambition to continue to involve herself in affairs in China and made the late-Imperial Chinese national crisis unprecedentedly serious. The degree of semi-colonisation was greatly deepened. After Japan's victory, the Western powers agreed tacitly that they should delimit their benefits from China promptly. They then started to partition China over the next few years, arranging a score of treaty ports and concessions in 1897-98 like Guangzhouwan and Port Arthur.

=== In China ===
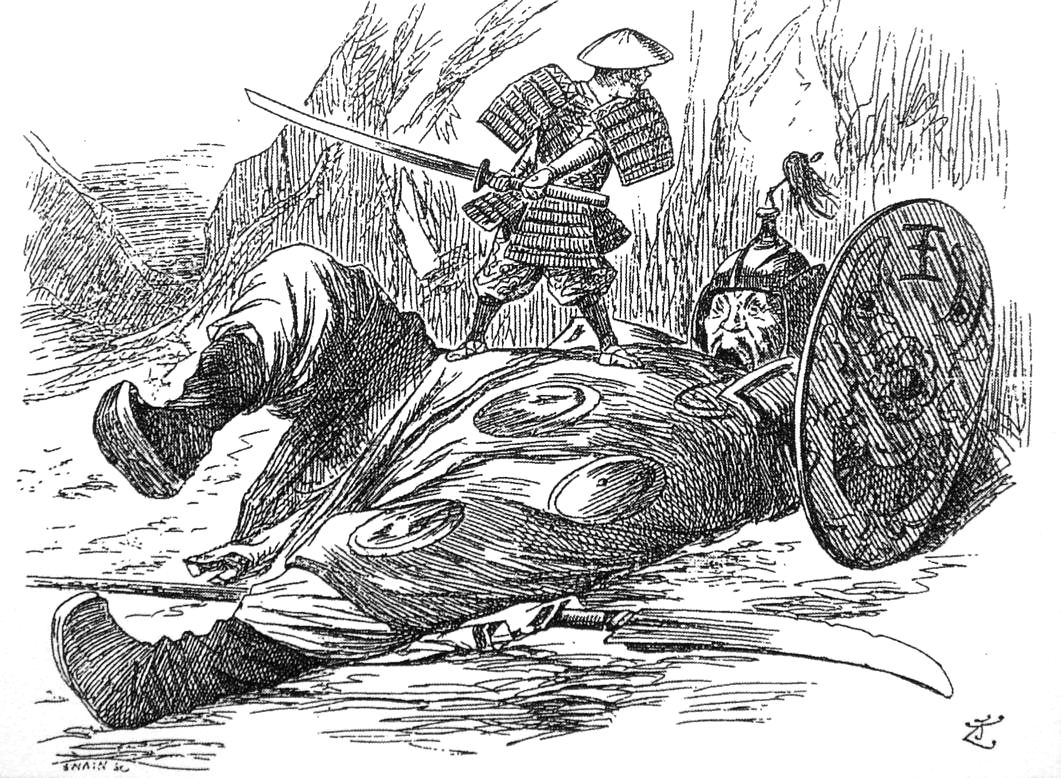
Satirical drawing in the magazine Punch (29 September 1894), showing the victory of "small" Japan over "large" China

For China, the war revealed the high level of corruption present in the government and policies of the Qing administration. Although the Qing court had invested heavily in modern ships for the Beiyang Fleet, the institutional weakness of the Qing did not allow the development of effective naval power. Traditionally, China viewed Japan as a subordinate part of the Chinese cultural sphere. China had been defeated by European powers in the 19th century, but defeat at the hands of an Asian power, one that she had traditionally considered as her either de facto or de jure tributary or at least an inferior, was a bitter psychological blow.

China's defeat precipitated an increase in railway construction in the country, as foreign powers demanded China make railway concessions.

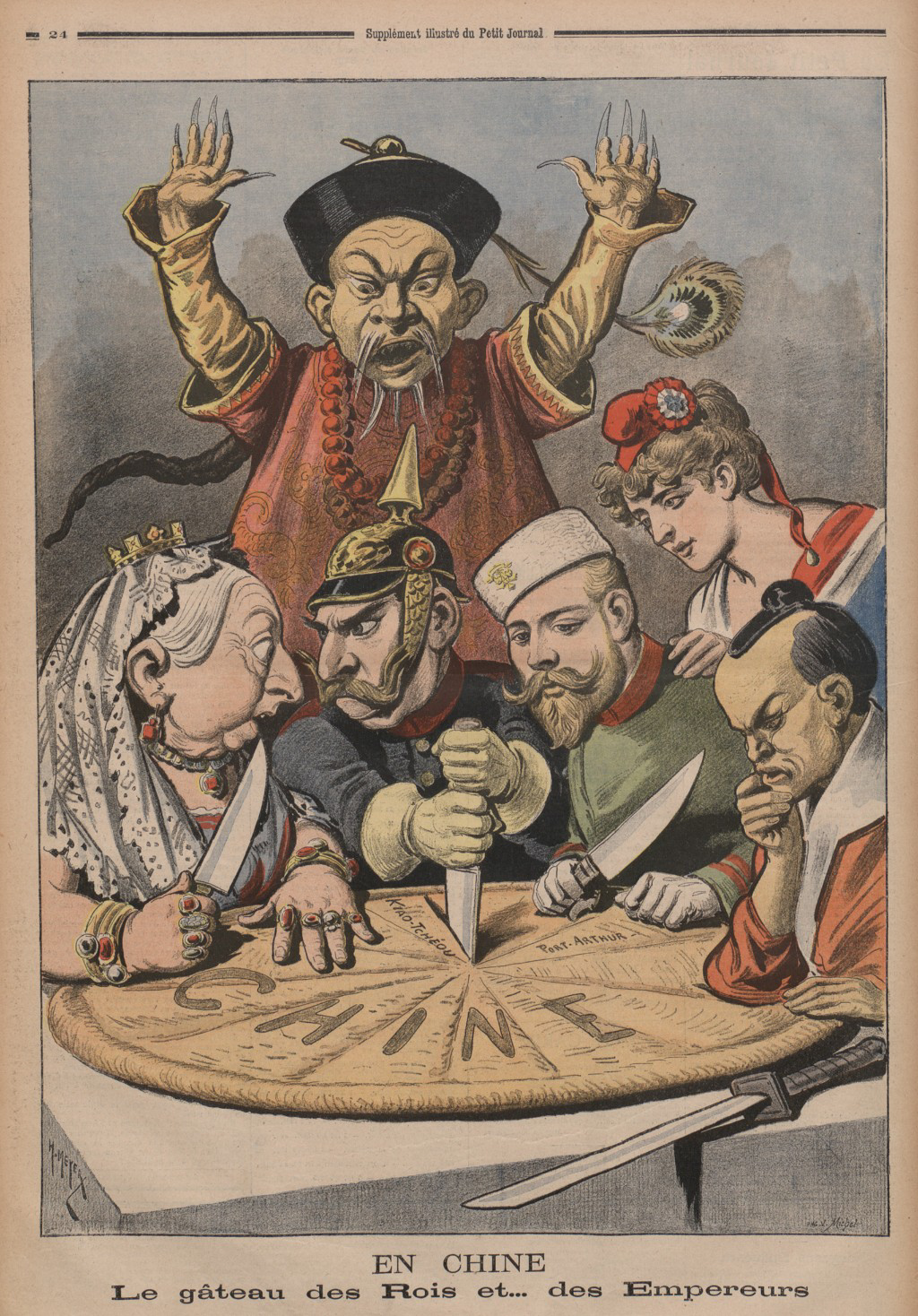
Western powers tried to divide their interests and influence in China in the aftermath of the First Sino-Japanese War.

In 1898, Russia signed a 25-year lease on the Liaodong Peninsula and proceeded to set up a naval station at Port Arthur. Although that infuriated the Japanese, they were more concerned with the Russian encroachment in Korea than in Manchuria. Other powers, such as France, Germany, and Britain, took advantage of the situation and gained land, port, and trade concessions at the expense of the decaying Qing dynasty. Qingdao was acquired by Germany, Guangzhouwan by France, and Weihaiwei and the New Territories by Britain.

Xenophobic sentiment and agitation grew, which would culminate in the Boxer Rebellion five years later. The Manchu people were devastated by the fighting during the First Sino-Japanese War and the Boxer Rebellion, with massive casualties sustained during the wars. It was then driven into extreme suffering and hardship in Beijing and northeastern China. The defeat eventually became a catalyst for a series of political upheavals led by Sun Yat-sen and Kang Youwei, culminating in the 1911 Revolution and the end of Qing dynastic rule in China.

=== In Europe ===
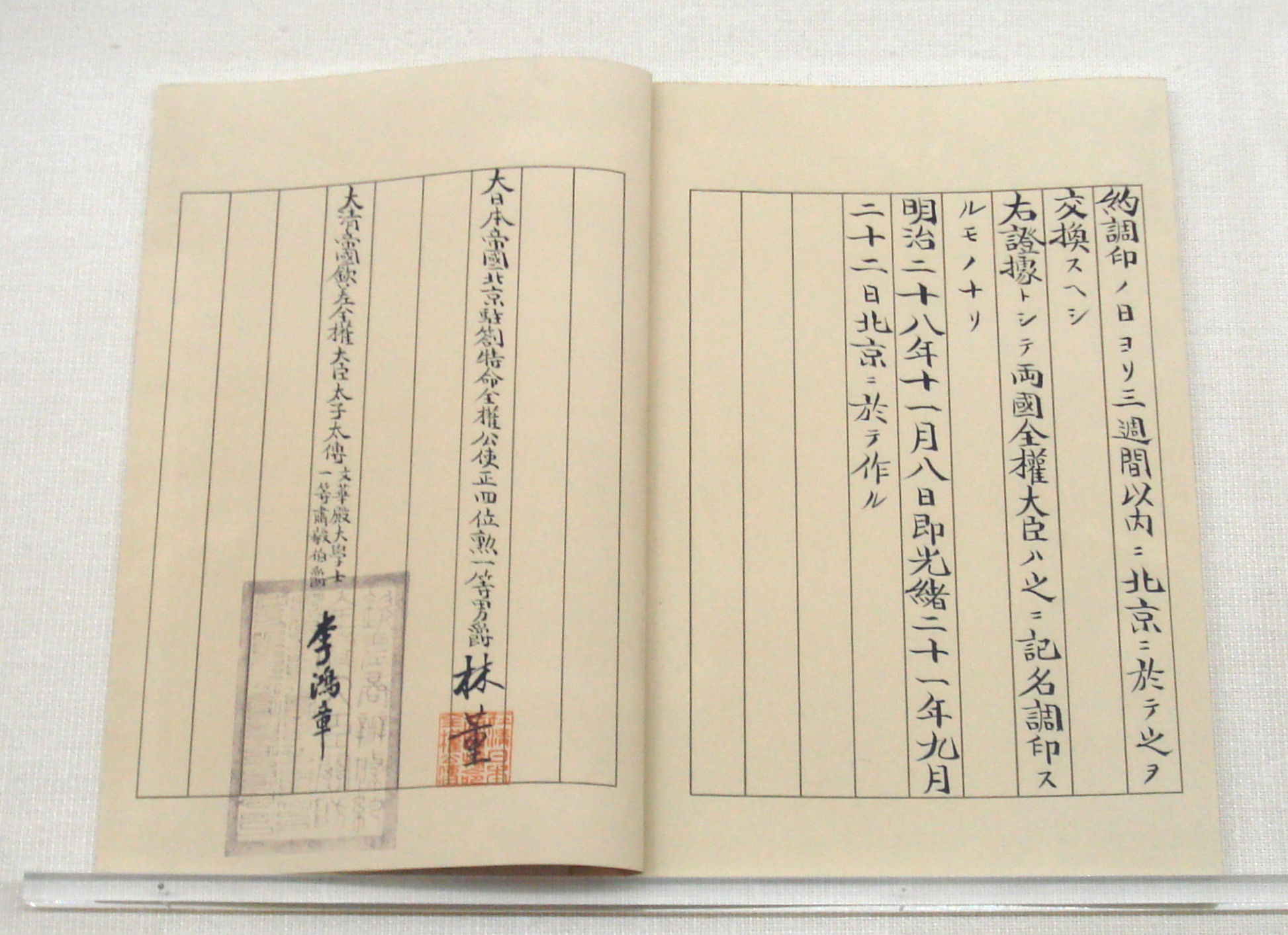
The Convention of retrocession of the Liaodong Peninsula, 8 November 1895

Japan had achieved what it had set out to accomplish and ended Chinese influence over Korea, but it had been forced to relinquish the Liaodong Peninsula (Port Arthur) in exchange for an increased financial indemnity. The European powers, especially Russia, had no objection to the other clauses of the treaty but felt that Japan should not gain Port Arthur since they had their own ambitions in that part of the world. Russia persuaded Germany and France to join in applying diplomatic pressure on Japan, which resulted in the Triple Intervention of 23 April 1895. Japan was handed a diplomatic note that strongly advised against the terms regarding the Liaodong Peninsula.

Faced with overwhelming military might, and lack of American or British intervention or support, Japan conceded the Liaodong Peninsula and revised the Treaty of Shimonoseki to demand an increased indemnity instead of the previous concessions in the region. The subsequent Western "scramble" for Chinese concessions was viewed with distaste in Japan, who then sought to break out of her diplomatic loneliness and cultivate closer, equal alliances with powers in the West to counter such a coalition in the future.

=== In Korea ===
Korea had proclaimed itself the Korean Empire in 1892 and announced its independence from the Qing Empire. The Japanese-sponsored Kabo Reforms of 1894–1896 transformed Korea. Legal slavery was abolished in all forms, the yangban class lost all special privileges, outcastes were abolished; equality of law was declared; equality of opportunity in the face of social background was established, child marriage was abolished; Hangul was to be used in government documents, Korean history was introduced in schools, the Chinese calendar was replaced with the Gregorian calendar, education was expanded, and new textbooks were written.

Although Japan had succeeded in eliminating Chinese influence over Korea, Russia seemed to reap the initial benefits. In 1895, a pro-Russian official attempted to remove the King of Korea to the Russian legation, and a second attempt later succeeded. Thus, for a year, the King reigned from the Russian legation in Seoul. The concession to build a Seoul-Inchon railway that had been granted to Japan in 1894 was revoked and granted to Russia. Russian guards guarded the king in his palace even after he had left the Russian legation.

=== Russo-Japanese War ===
Tensions between Russia and Japan would increase in the years after the First Sino-Japanese War. During the Boxer Rebellion, an eight-member international force was sent to suppress and quell the uprising; Russia sent troops into Manchuria as part of that force. After the suppression of the Boxers, the Russian government agreed to vacate the area. However, by 1903, it had actually increased the size of its forces in Manchuria.

Negotiations between the two nations (1901–1904) to establish mutual recognition of respective spheres of influence (Russia over Manchuria and Japan over Korea) were repeatedly and intentionally stalled by the Russians. They felt that they were strong and confident enough not to accept any compromise and believed that Japan would not go to war against a European power. Russia also had intentions to use Manchuria as a springboard for further expansion of its interests in the Far East. In 1903, Russian soldiers began construction of a fort at Yongnampo but stopped after Japanese protests.

In 1902, Japan formed an alliance with Britain, the terms of which stated that if Japan went to war in the Far East and a third power entered the fight against Japan, Britain would come to the aid of the Japanese. That was a check to prevent Germany or France from intervening militarily in any future war against Russia. Japan sought to prevent a repetition of the Triple Intervention, which deprived it of Port Arthur. The British reasons for joining the alliance were to check the spread of Russian expansion into the Pacific area, to strengthen Britain's focus on other areas, and to gain a powerful naval ally in the Pacific.

Increasing tensions between Japan and Russia were results of Russia's unwillingness to compromise and the prospect of Korea falling under Russia's domination and thus coming into conflict with and undermining Japan's interests. Eventually, Japan was forced to take action. That would be the deciding factor and catalyst leading to the Russo-Japanese War of 1904–05.

== See also ==
- History of China
- History of Japan
- History of Korea
- History of Taiwan
- Military history of China
- Military history of Japan
- Sino-Japanese relations
- Franco-Japanese pact attempted in 1885
