= 1858 =

1858 in various calendars
- Gregorian calendar: 1858; MDCCCLVIII
- Ab urbe condita: 2611
- Armenian calendar: 1307; ԹՎ ՌՅԷ
- Assyrian calendar: 6608
- Baháʼí calendar: 14–15
- Balinese saka calendar: 1779–1780
- Bengali calendar: 1264–1265
- Berber calendar: 2808
- British Regnal year: 21 Vict. 1 – 22 Vict. 1
- Buddhist calendar: 2402
- Burmese calendar: 1220
- Byzantine calendar: 7366–7367
- Chinese calendar: 丁巳年 (Fire Snake); 4555 or 4348 — to — 戊午年 (Earth Horse); 4556 or 4349
- Coptic calendar: 1574–1575
- Discordian calendar: 3024
- Ethiopian calendar: 1850–1851
- Hebrew calendar: 5618–5619
- Hindu calendars
- Vikram Samvat: 1914–1915
- Shaka Samvat: 1779–1780
- Kali Yuga: 4958–4959
- Holocene calendar: 11858
- Igbo calendar: 858–859
- Iranian calendar: 1236–1237
- Islamic calendar: 1274–1275
- Japanese calendar: Ansei 5 (安政５年)
- Javanese calendar: 1786–1787
- Julian calendar: Gregorian minus 12 days
- Korean calendar: 4191
- Minguo calendar: 54 before ROC 民前54年
- Nanakshahi calendar: 390
- Thai solar calendar: 2400–2401
- Tibetan calendar: མེ་མོ་སྦྲུལ་ལོ་ (female Fire-Snake); 1984 or 1603 or 831 — to — ས་ཕོ་རྟ་ལོ་ (male Earth-Horse); 1985 or 1604 or 832

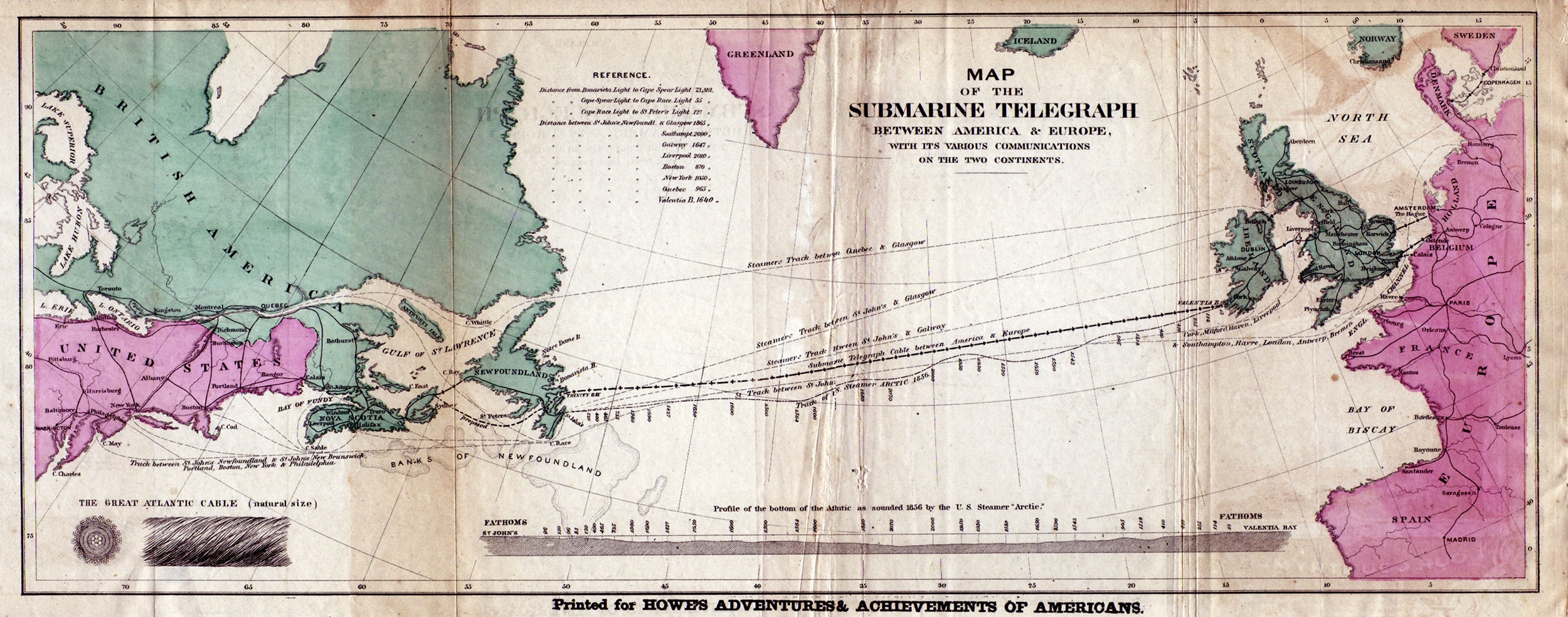
August 5: the first telecommunications cable to link Europe and North America is inaugurated.

1858 (MDCCCLVIII) was a common year starting on Friday of the Gregorian calendar and a common year starting on Wednesday of the Julian calendar, the 1858th year of the Common Era (CE) and Anno Domini (AD) designations, the 858th year of the 2nd millennium, the 58th year of the 19th century, and the 9th year of the 1850s decade. As of the start of 1858, the Gregorian calendar was 12 days ahead of the Julian calendar, which remained in localized use until 1923.

== Events ==
=== January–March ===
- January 9
  - Revolt of Rajab Ali: British forces finally defeat Rajab Ali Khan of Chittagong.
  - Anson Jones, the last president of the Republic of Texas, commits suicide.
- January 14 – Orsini affair: Piedmontese revolutionary Felice Orsini and his accomplices fail to assassinate Napoleon III in Paris, but their bombs kill eight and wound 142 people. Because of the involvement of French émigrés living in Britain, there is a brief anti-British feeling in France, but the emperor refuses to support it.
- January 25 – The Wedding March by Felix Mendelssohn becomes a popular wedding recessional, after it is played on this day at the marriage of Queen Victoria's daughter Victoria, Princess Royal, to Prince Friedrich of Prussia in St James's Palace, London.
- January
  - Benito Juárez becomes the Liberal President of Mexico and its first indigenous president. At the same time, the conservatives installed Félix María Zuloaga as a rival president.
  - Prince Wilhelm of Prussia becomes regent for his brother, King Frederick William IV, who has suffered a stroke. After Prince William's term acting as a regent for the King had been extended three times, the ailing Frederick William signed a regency charter for him on 7 October 1858, based on an expert opinion from the royal personal physicians.
- February 11 – Lourdes apparitions: Pauper girl Bernadette Soubirous of Lourdes, fourteen, has a vision at the grotto of Massabielle, the first in a series of eighteen events which will come to be regarded as Marian apparitions.
- February 13 – Richard Francis Burton and John Hanning Speke become the first Europeans to discover Lake Tanganyika.
- February
  - Queen Victoria announces her choice of Ottawa as capital of the Province of Canada.
- March 13 – Felice Orsini is executed by guillotine for the attempted assassination of Napoleon III of France.
- March 21 – Indian Rebellion: British troops retake Lucknow.
- March 30 – Hymen Lipman patents a pencil with an attached eraser in the United States.

=== April–June ===
- April 16 – The Wernerian Natural History Society, a former Scottish learned society, is wound up.
- April 19 – The United States signs a treaty with the Yankton Sioux Tribe.
- April 28–May 1 – Battle of Grahovac: The Ottomans are decisively defeated by Montenegrin forces. The Bawani Imli massacre, (April 28) where 52 Indian freedom fighters were hanged to death on a tamarind tree by British colonial forces.
- May 11 – Minnesota is admitted as the 32nd U.S. state.
- May 13 – John Ruskin begins a tour of Europe; he considers it a significant turning point in his life.
- May 14 – David Livingstone's 6-year Second Zambesi expedition arrives at the African coast.
- May 19 – "Bleeding Kansas: The Marais des Cygnes massacre is perpetrated by pro-slavery forces in the U.S. state of Kansas.
- May 28 - The Treaty of Aigun is signed by Yishan and Nikolay Muravyov-Amursky on behalf of the Qing Dynasty and the Russian Empire.
- May–July – Mahtra War: Peasants in the Governorate of Estonia, Russian Empire revolt against ongoing serfdom, which was officially abolished in 1816.
- May (unknown date) – Japanese trading company Itochu founded in Toyosato, Shiga Prefecture, Japan.
- June 2 – Comet Donati, the first comet to be photographed, is discovered by Giovanni Battista Donati, and remains visible for several months afterwards.
- June 13–17 – The Treaty of Tientsin is signed, ending the first part of the Second Opium War.
- June 16 – Abraham Lincoln accepts the Republican Party nomination for a seat in the United States Senate, delivering his House Divided speech in Springfield, Illinois.
- June 17 – The Atlantic and North Carolina Railroad opens, operating 95 miles from Goldsboro, North Carolina, to New Bern, North Carolina.
- June 18 – The Queen of Jhansi, Rani Lakshmibai, dies at 30 at Gwalior, having been mortally wounded in combat against the British.
- June 19 – A six-minute earthquake destroys much of Mexico City and devastates Texcoco.
- June 20 – Indian Rebellion of 1857: The last rebels surrender in Gwalior.
- June 23 – Police of the Papal States seize Jewish boy Edgardo Mortara, and take him away to be raised as a Catholic.

=== July–September ===
- July 1 – A joint presentation of papers by Darwin and Alfred Russel Wallace, announcing a theory of evolution by natural selection, are read at London's Linnean Society.
- July 8 – A peace treaty ends the Indian Rebellion.
- July 12 – The Advertiser, a daily newspaper still in circulation, begins publication in Adelaide, Australia.
- July 17 – The Lutine bell is salvaged, and subsequently hung in Lloyd's of London.
- July 28 – In Bengal, India, British officer William James Herschel uses the hand impression of Rajyadhar Konai, as a contract fingerprint signature.
- July 29 – The United States and Japan sign the Treaty of Amity and Commerce, negotiated by Townsend Harris.
- July
  - Camillo Benso, Count of Cavour goads Austria into attacking Sardinia.
  - Pike's Peak Gold Rush: Fifty-Niners stream into the Rocky Mountains of the western United States.
- August 2
  - The Government of India Act, passed by the Parliament of the United Kingdom, transfers the territories of the British East India Company and their administration to the direct rule of the British Crown, through a Secretary of State for India.
  - A bill is passed to create a modern sewage system in London as a result of the Great Stink, when the heat of the summer made the smell from sewage in the Thames unbearable.
- August 5 – Cyrus West Field and others complete the first transatlantic telegraph cable, after several unsuccessful attempts. The service ends on September 1, due to weak current.
- August 7 – A football match, played under an unknown set of rules, is held between Melbourne Grammar School and Scotch College.
- August 8 – Ottoman Penal Code decriminalized homosexual sex between consenting adults in the Ottoman Empire
- August 11 – The Eiger is first ascended.
- August 16 – U.S. President James Buchanan inaugurates the new trans-Atlantic telegraph cable, by exchanging greetings with Queen Victoria. However, a weak signal forces a shutdown of the service in a few weeks.
- August 21 – The first of the Lincoln–Douglas debates is held in Illinois.

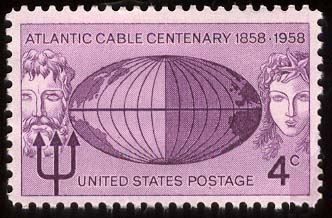
August 5: A commemorative stamp for the first transatlantic telegraph cable.

- August – The first aerial photography is carried out by Nadar, from a moored balloon in France.
- September 11 – Dom, the third-highest summit in the Alps, is first ascended.
- September – Cochinchina Campaign: French warships, under Charles Rigault de Genouilly, attack and occupy Da Nang, Vietnam.

=== October–December ===
- October 21 – Jacques Offenbach's operetta Orpheus in the Underworld, featuring music associated with the can-can, is first performed in Paris.
- October 28 – Macy's department store, founded by R. H. Macy, opens for business in New York City.
- November 12 – Johann II, Prince of Liechtenstein, succeeds to the throne aged 18; he will rule until his death in 1929, the second-longest in European royal history and the longest precisely documented tenure of any monarch without a regent since antiquity.
- November 16 – The 2,400,000th day of the Epoch of the Julian day is reached.
- November 17
  - The city of Denver, Colorado, is founded.
  - Modified Julian Day zero starts on this date.
- December 7 — Mexican Conservative interim president Félix María Zuloaga proclaims the Plan of Tacubaya to abolish the Reform Laws, setting off a three-year civil war (1857–1860).
- December 24 — Manuel Robles Pezuela (1817–1862) becomes Conservative president of Mexico.
- December 29 – The Northern Railway Company is established in Madrid, Spain, with a purpose to construct the Northern Railway.
- December 30 – Paraguay expedition: Seventeen U.S. Navy warships, under the command of William Shubrick, depart from Uruguay on a mission to demand concessions from Paraguay, and to go to war if necessary.

=== Date unknown ===
- The Russian Empire changes its flag.
- William M. Tweed begins his 13-year term as "Boss" of Tammany Hall.
- The haute couture firm of Worth and Bobergh is established in Paris.
- The Miners Association is established in Cornwall, England, UK.
- Feudalism and serfdom in Bulgaria are abolished in the Ottoman Empire (practically in 1880).
- Squibb Pharmacy, as predecessor of Bristol Myers Squibb, a worldwide pharmaceutical brand, is founded in New York, United States.
- In October or November, the Opera Game, one of the most famous chess games of all time, is played between Paul Morphy and two amateurs at an opera performance in Paris

== Births ==
=== January–February ===
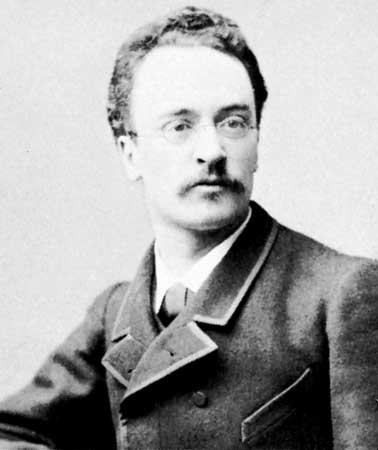
Rudolf Diesel

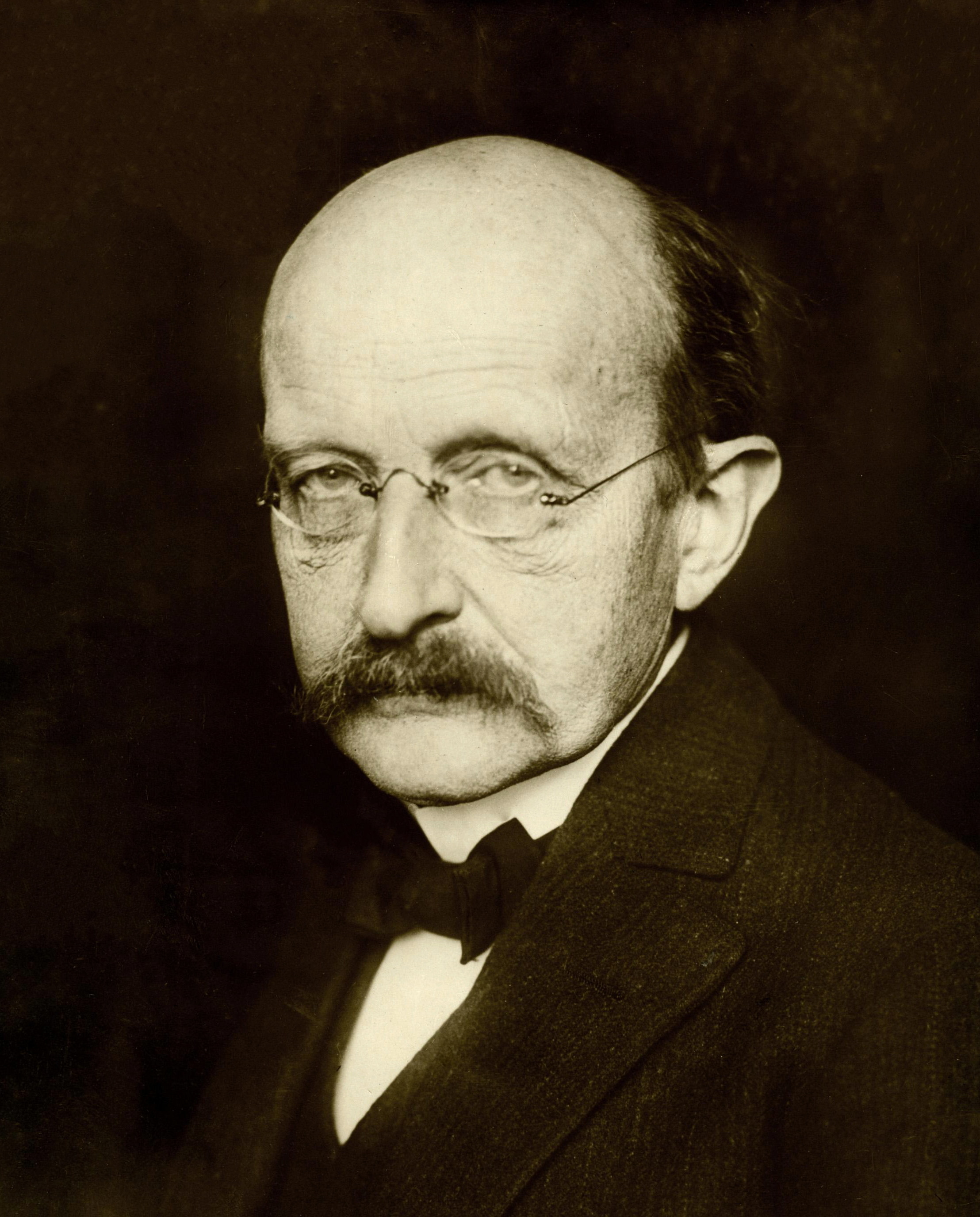
Max Planck

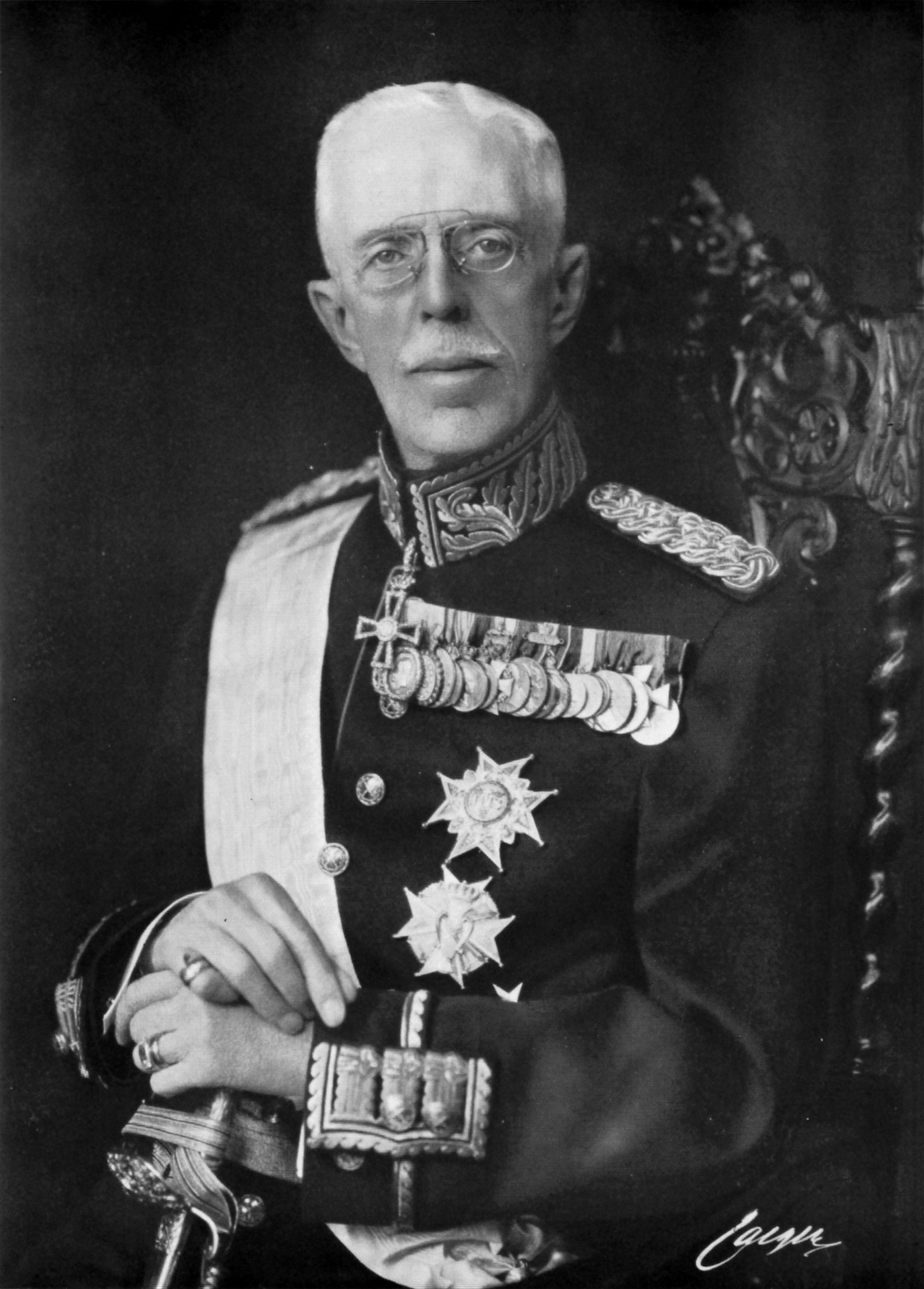
Gustaf V of Sweden

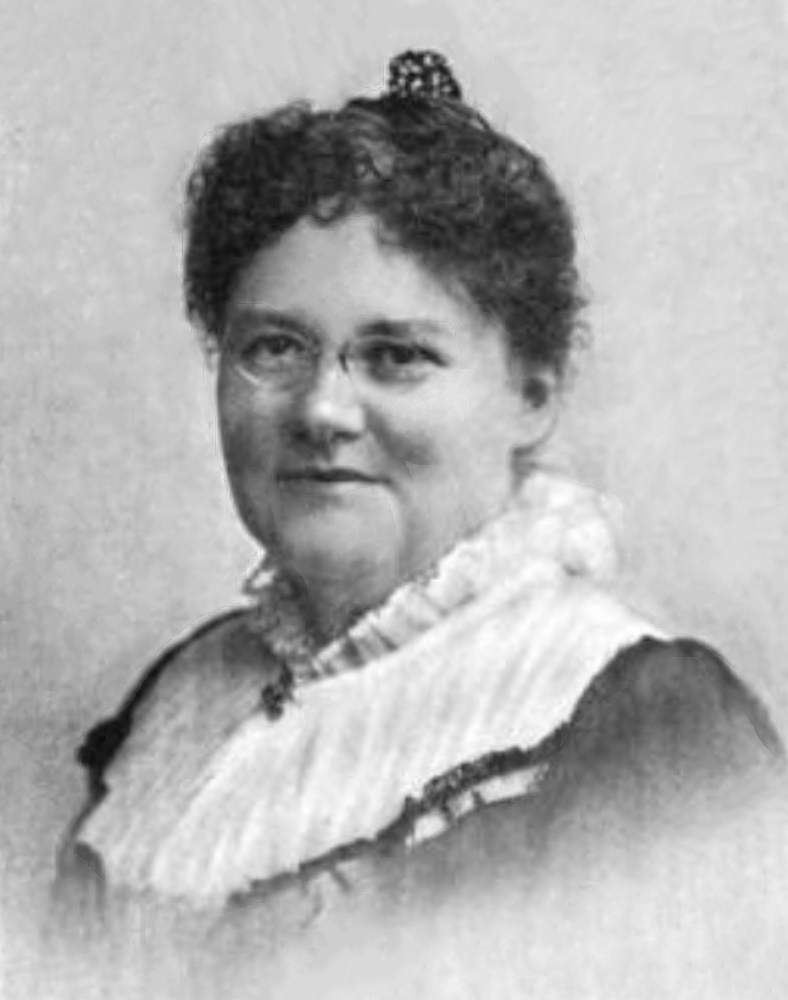
Lillie Eginton Warren

- January 7 – Louise Emmons, American-born actress (d. 1935)
- January 7 – Eliezer Ben-Yehuda, Russian-born advocate of the Hebrew language (d. 1922)
- January 10 – Heinrich Zille, German illustrator, photographer (d. 1929)
- January 11 – Harry Gordon Selfridge, American department store magnate (d. 1947)
- January 13 – Oskar Minkowski, Lithuanian physician (d. 1931)
- January 22 – Frederick Lugard, 1st Baron Lugard, English soldier, explorer and colonial administrator (d. 1945)
- January 25 – Lillie Eginton Warren, American speech therapy pioneer (d. 1926)
- January 27 – Neel Doff, Dutch-born French author (d. 1942)
- January 28 – Eugène Dubois, Dutch paleoanthropologist and geologist (d. 1940)
- February 15 – John Joseph Montgomery, American glider pioneer (d. 1911)
- February 18 – Wilhelm Schmidt, German pioneer of superheated steam for use in locomotives (d. 1924)
- February 19 – Charles Alexander Eastman, Native American author, physician, reformer, helped found the Boy Scouts of America (d. 1939)
- February 24 – Alphonse Jacques de Dixmude, Belgian general (d. 1928)

=== March–April ===
- March 6 – Samuel Untermyer, American lawyer (d. 1940)
- March 8 – Ida Hunt Udall, American diarist, homesteader (d. 1915)
- March 9 – Gustav Stickley, American furniture designer, architect (d. 1942)
- March 10 – Kōkichi Mikimoto, Japanese pearl farm pioneer (d. 1954)
- March 15 – Liberty Hyde Bailey, American botanist (d. 1954)
- March 18 – Rudolf Diesel, German inventor, automotive pioneer (d. 1913)
- March 23 – Ludwig Quidde, German pacifist, recipient of the Nobel Peace Prize (d. 1941)
- March 26 – William Thomas Smedley, American artist (d. 1920)
- March 27 – Richard Friedrich Johannes Pfeiffer, German physician, bacteriologist (d. 1945)
- March 28 – Joséphin Péladan, French novelist (d. 1918)
- March 30 – DeWolf Hopper, American actor, singer, comedian, and theatrical producer (d. 1935)
- April 3 – Mary Harrison McKee, de facto First Lady of the United States (d. 1930)
- April 19 – May Robson, Australian-born American actress (d. 1942)
- April 22 – Fritz Mayer van den Bergh, Belgian art collector and art historian (d. 1901)
- April 23 – Max Planck, German physicist, Nobel Prize laureate (d. 1947)
- April 24 – Philogone Segard, French radical anarchist linked to Ravachol (d. 20th century)
- April 30 – Mary Dimmick Harrison, 2nd wife of President Benjamin Harrison (d. 1948)

=== May–June ===
- May 8 – Heinrich Berté, Austrian operetta composer (d. 1924)
- May 15 – Cecil Burney, British admiral (d. 1929)
- May 21 – Édouard Goursat, French mathematician (d. 1936)
- May 26 – Horace Smith-Dorrien, British general (d. 1930)
- June 5 – Carl Swartz, 14th Prime Minister of Sweden (d. 1926)
- June 8 – Charlotte Scott, English mathematician (d. 1931)
- June 12 – Harry Johnston, British explorer, botanist, artist, colonial administrator, linguist (d. 1927)
- June 16
  - King Gustaf V of Sweden (d. 1950)
  - William D. Boyce, founder of the Boy Scouts of America (d. 1929)
  - Isabel Grimes Richey, American poet (d. 1910)
- June 19 – Sir George Alexander, English actor (d. 1918)
- June 20
  - Charles W. Chesnutt, African-American author, essayist, political activist (d. 1932)
  - Paul Maistre, French general (d. 1922)
  - Alexander Ragoza, Russian general and Ukrainian politician (d. 1919)
- June 28 – Otis Skinner, American film actor (d. 1943)

=== July–August ===
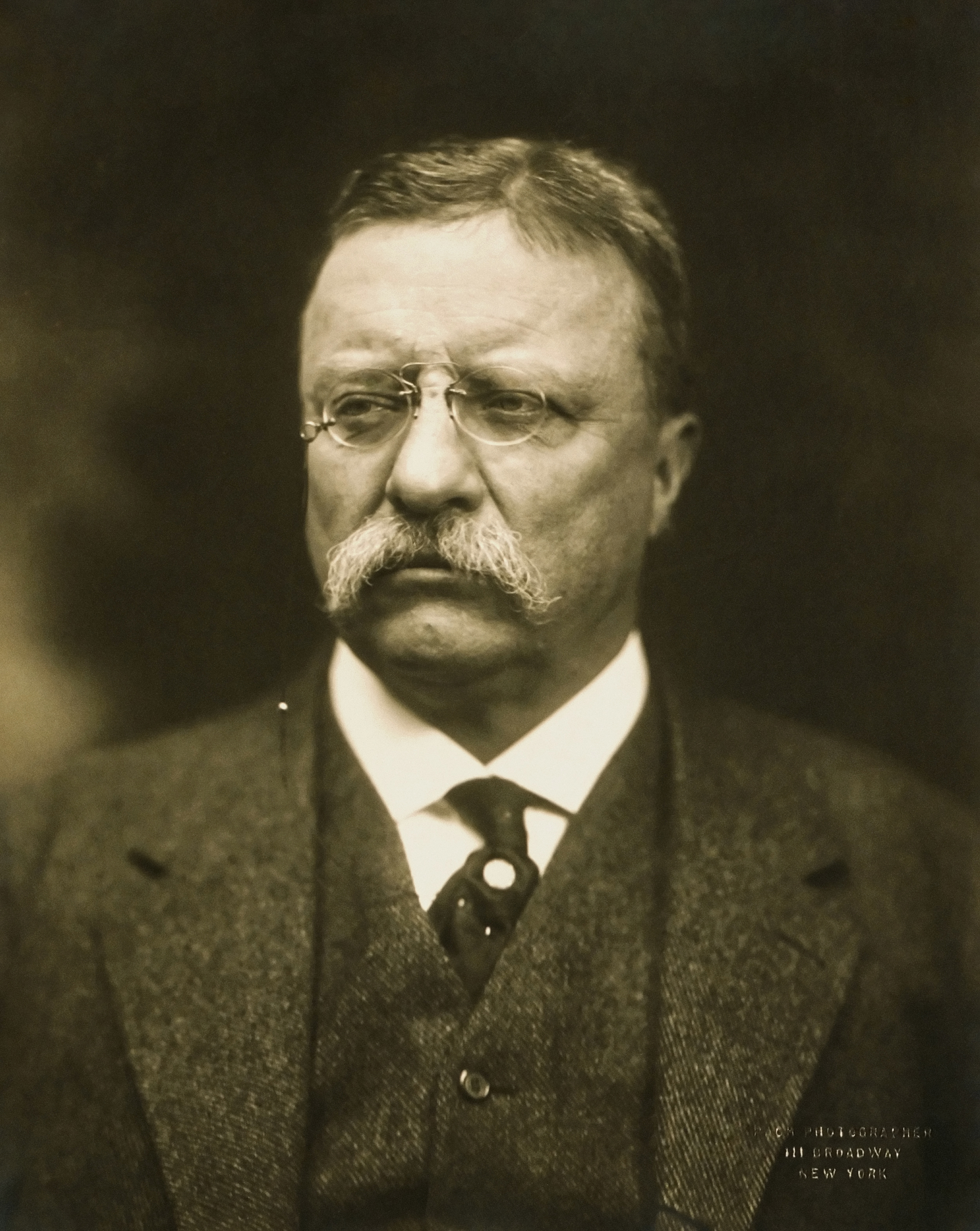
Theodore Roosevelt

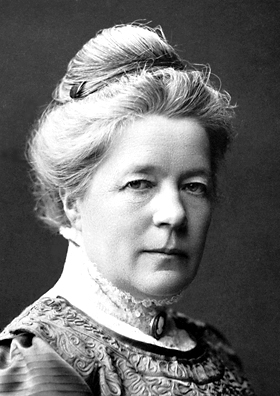
Selma Lagerlöf

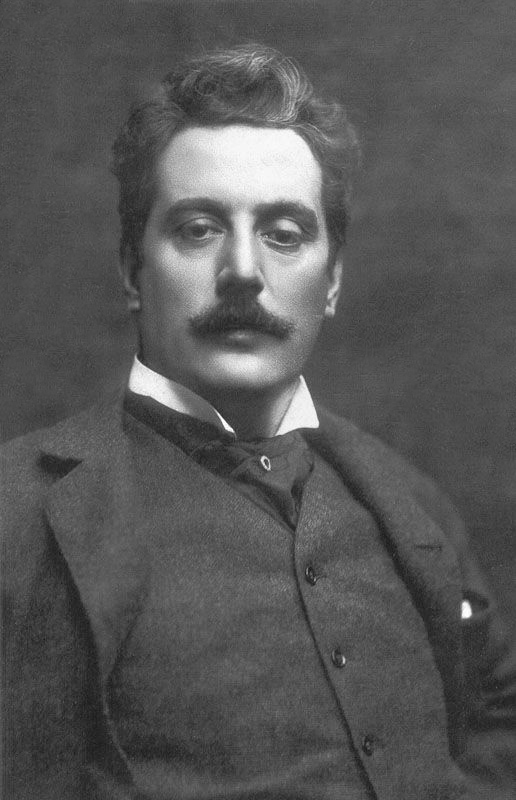
Giacomo Puccini

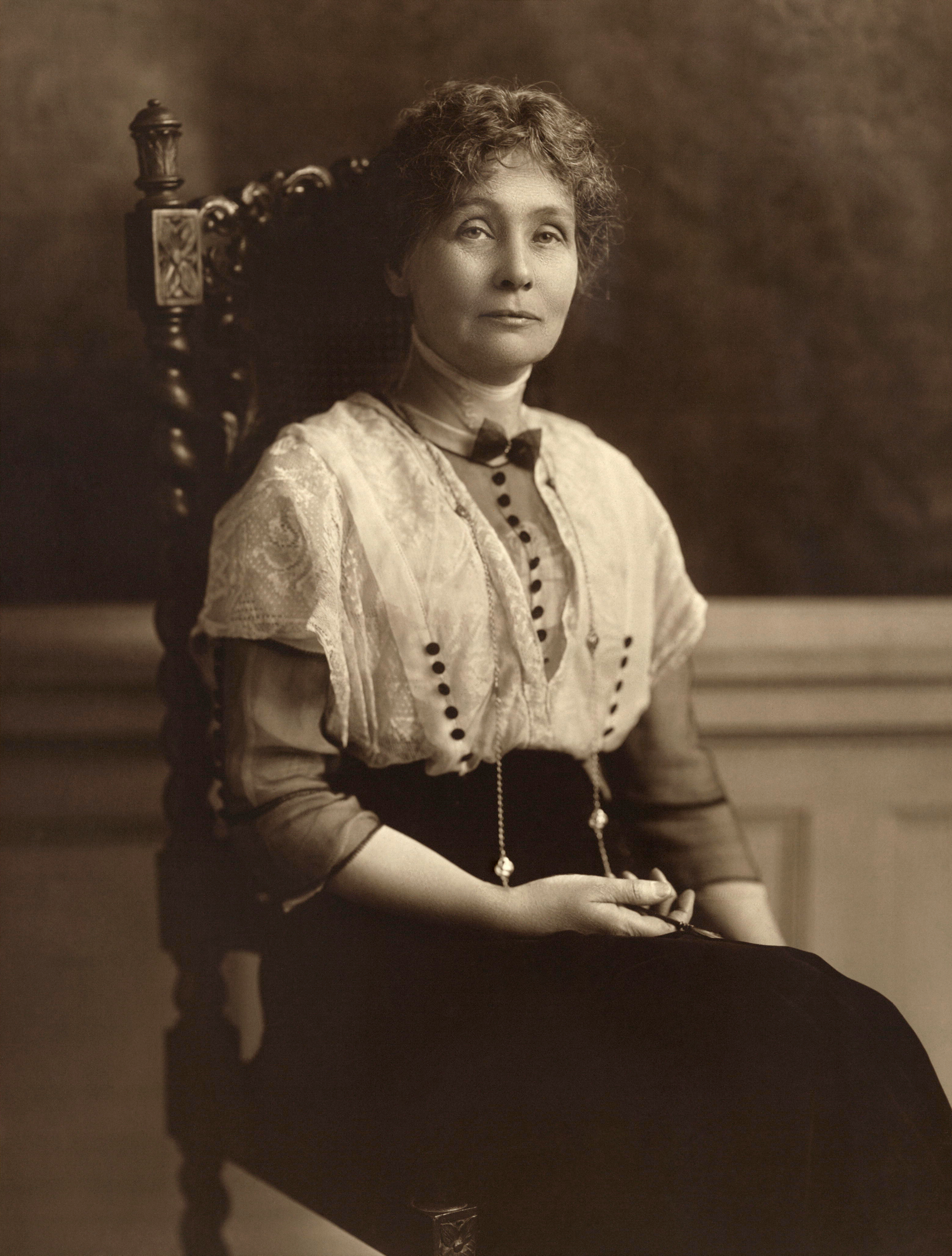
Emmeline Pankhurst

- July 9 – Franz Boas, German anthropologist (d. 1942)
- July 14 – Emmeline Pankhurst, English suffragette, mother of Christabel, Sylvia and Adela Pankhurst (d. 1928)
- July 16 – Petar Bojović, Serbian field marshal (d. 1945)
- July 20 – Baba Sawan Singh, Second Satguru of Radha Soami Satsang Beas (d. 1948)
- July 21 – Maria Christina of Austria, queen consort of Spain, second wife of Alfonso XII of Spain (d. 1929)
- July 28 – José Luis Tamayo, 20th President of Ecuador (d. 1947)
- Gabriel Anton, Austrian Neurologist (d. 1933)
- August 1 – Hans Rott, Austrian composer (d. 1884)
- August 2 – Emma of Waldeck and Pyrmont, queen consort, regent of the Netherlands (d. 1934)
- August 10 – Georgi Todorov, Bulgarian general (d. 1934)
- August 11 – Christiaan Eijkman, Dutch physician, pathologist, recipient of the Nobel Prize in Physiology or Medicine (d. 1930)
- August 13 – G. E. M. Skues, Newfoundland-born British inventor of nymph fly fishing (d. 1949)
- August 15 – E. Nesbit, English children's novelist (d. 1924)
- August 18 – Thomas S. Rodgers, American admiral (d. 1931)
- August 19
  - Alfred Dyke Acland, British military officer (d. 1937)
  - Ellen Willmott, English horticulturalist (d. 1934)
- August 21 – Ethlyn T. Clough, American newspaper owner, editor, and manager (d. 1936)
- August 27 – Giuseppe Peano, Italian mathematician (d. 1932)
- August 30 – Ignaz Sowinski, Polish architect (d. 1917)

=== September–October ===
- September 1
  - Andrew Jackson Zilker, American philanthropist (d. 1934)
  - Carl Auer von Welsbach, Austrian chemist and inventor (d. 1929)
- September 15 – Emma Augusta Sharkey, American dime novelist (d. 1902)
- September 16
  - Carl August Ehrensvärd, Swedish admiral and politician (d. 1944)
  - Bonar Law, Canadian-born Prime Minister of the United Kingdom (d. 1923)
- September 21 – Shimamura Hayao, Japanese admiral (d. 1923)
- October 3 – Eleonora Duse, Italian actress (d. 1924)
- October 12 – John L. Sullivan, American heavyweight boxing champion (d. 1918)
- October 15 – William Sims, American admiral (d. 1936)
- October 19 – George Albert Boulenger, Belgian naturalist (d. 1937)
- October 25 – Take Ionescu, 29th prime minister of Romania (d. 1922)
- October 27
  - Theodore Roosevelt, 26th President of the United States, recipient of the Nobel Peace Prize (d. 1919)
  - Saitō Makoto, Japanese admiral, 19th Prime Minister of Japan (d. 1936)

=== November–December ===
- November 10 – Heinrich XXVII, Prince Reuss Younger Line, German prince (d. 1928)
- November 20 – Selma Lagerlöf, Swedish writer, Nobel Prize laureate (d. 1940)
- November 23 – Albert Ranft, Swedish theatre director, actor (d. 1938)
- November 26 – Katharine Drexel, American Roman Catholic saint (d. 1955)
- November 30 – Jagadish Chandra Bose, Indian physicist (d. 1937)
- December 18 – Kata Dalström, Swedish politician (d. 1923)
- December 19 – Adolf Schiel, German-born officer in Boer armed forces (d. 1903)
- December 22 – Giacomo Puccini, Italian composer (d. 1924)
- December 25 – Herman P. Faris, American temperance movement leader (d. 1936)
- December 27 – Juan Luis Sanfuentes, 16th President of Chile (d. 1930)

== Deaths ==
=== January–June ===
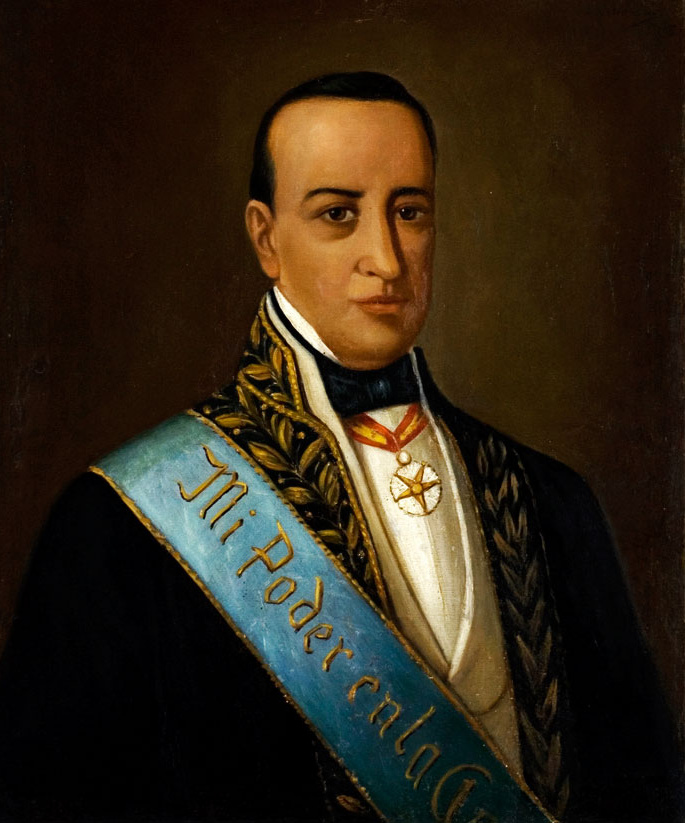
Vicente Ramón Roca

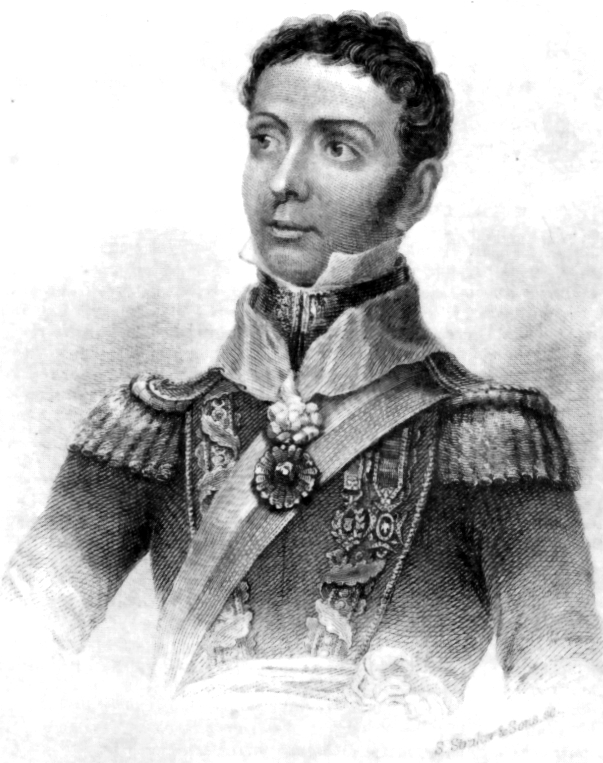
José de la Riva Agüero

- January 4 – Amelia Griffiths, English phycologist (b. 1768)
- January 5 – Joseph Radetzky von Radetz, Austrian field marshal (b. 1766)
- January 9 – Anson Jones, 4th and last President of the Republic of Texas (suicide) (b. 1798)
- February 21 – John K. Kane, American politician and jurist (b. 1795)
- February 23 – Vicente Ramón Roca, 3rd President of Ecuador (b. 1792)
- March 4 – Commodore Matthew Calbraith Perry, American naval officer (b. 1794)
- March 13 – Georgios Kountouriotis, Prime Minister of Greece (b. 1782)
- April 7 – Anton Diabelli, Austrian composer (b. 1781)
- May 11 – Joseph Gensoul, French surgeon (b. 1797)
- May 21 – José de la Riva Agüero, Peruvian soldier and politician, 1st President of Peru and 2nd President of North Peru (b. 1783)
- June 3 – Julius Reubke, German composer (b. 1834)
- June 18 – Rani of Jhansi, Indian queen of Jhansi and independence activist (b. 1828)
- June 28
  - Jane Marcet, British science writer (b. 1769)
  - Auguste de Montferrand, French architect (b. 1786)

=== July–December ===
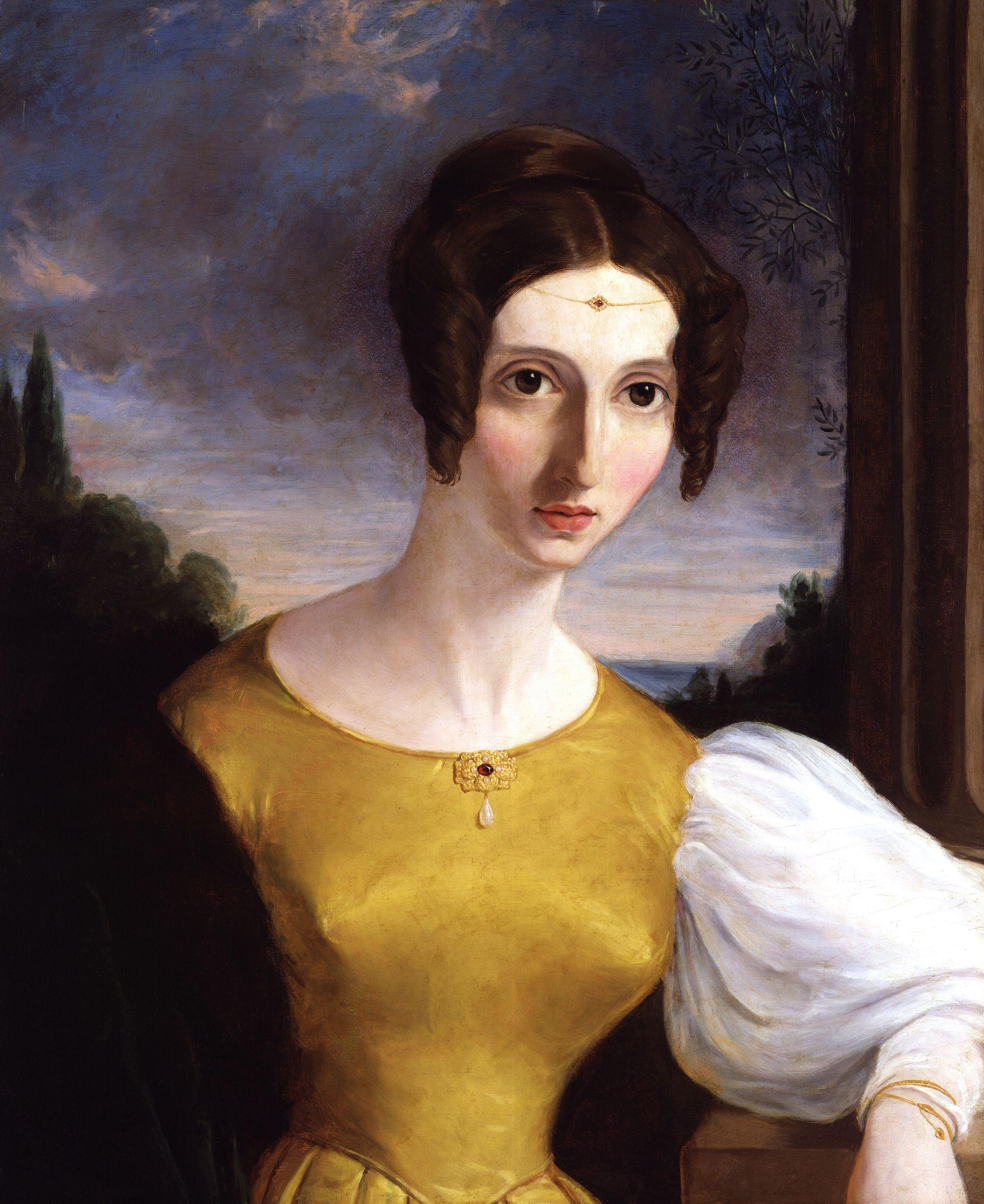
Harriet Taylor Mill

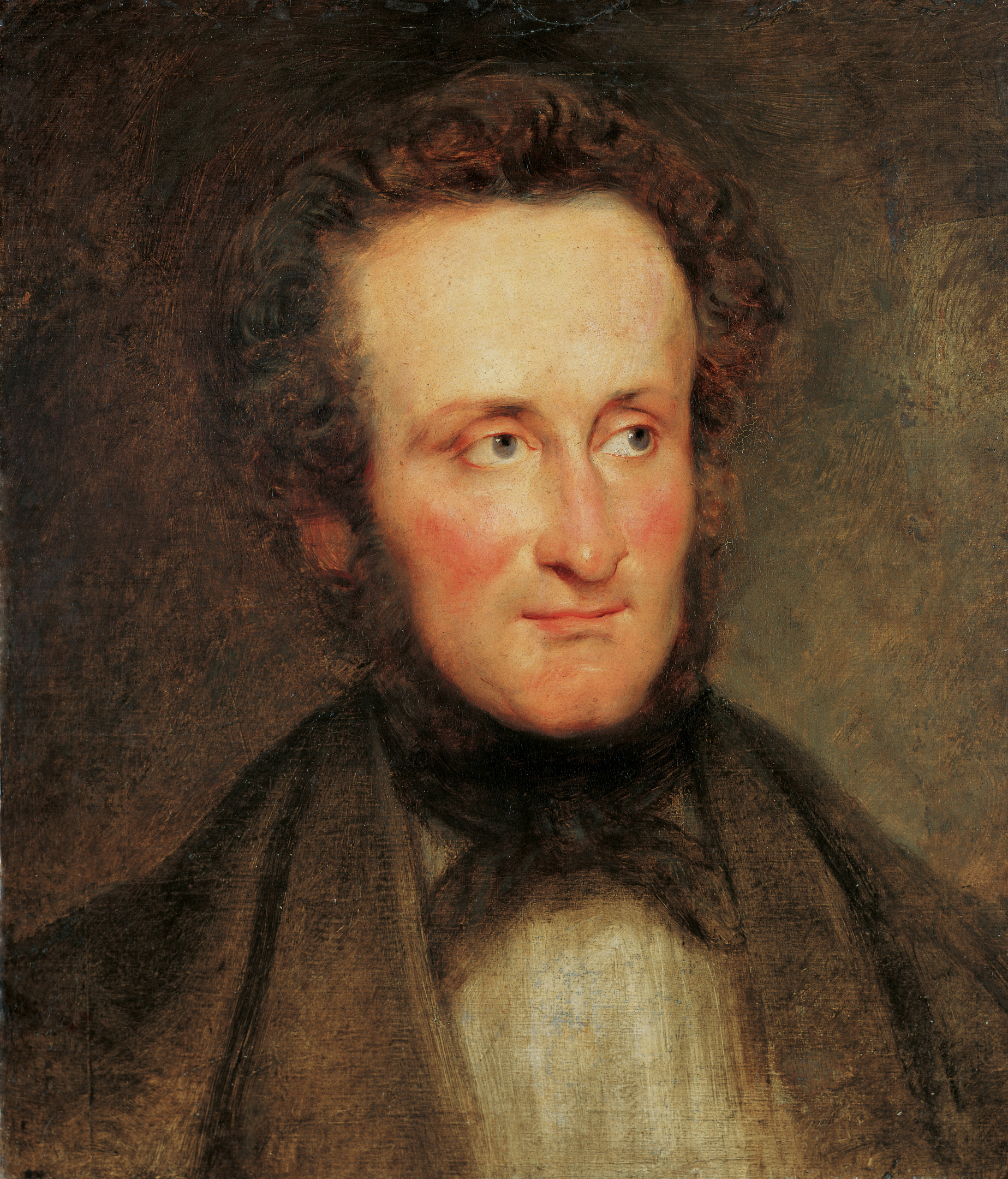
Aloys II, Prince of Liechtenstein

- August 14 – Tokugawa Iesada, 13th shōgun of the Tokugawa shogunate of Japan (b. 1824)
- August 31 – Chief Oshkosh, Menominee chief (b. 1795)
- September 9 – Thomas Assheton Smith II, English politician, cricketer (b. 1776)
- September 17 – Dred Scott, African-American slave (b. c. 1795)
- November 3 – Harriet Taylor Mill, British philosopher, women's rights advocate (b. 1807)
- November 12 – Aloys II, Prince of Liechtenstein (b. 1796)
- November 15 – Li Xubin, Chinese military leader (b. 1817)
- November 17 – Robert Owen, British social reformer (b. 1771)
- November 24 – Wincenty Krasiński, Polish military leader (b. 1782)
- December 3 – Joseph Marie Élisabeth Durocher, French geologist (b. 1817)
- December 13 – Karl Ludwig Philipp Zeyher, German botanist (b. 1799)
- December 17 – Mustafa Reşid Pasha, Ottoman statesman (b. 1800)
