= Taqibu =

General of the Qing dynasty

塔齐布
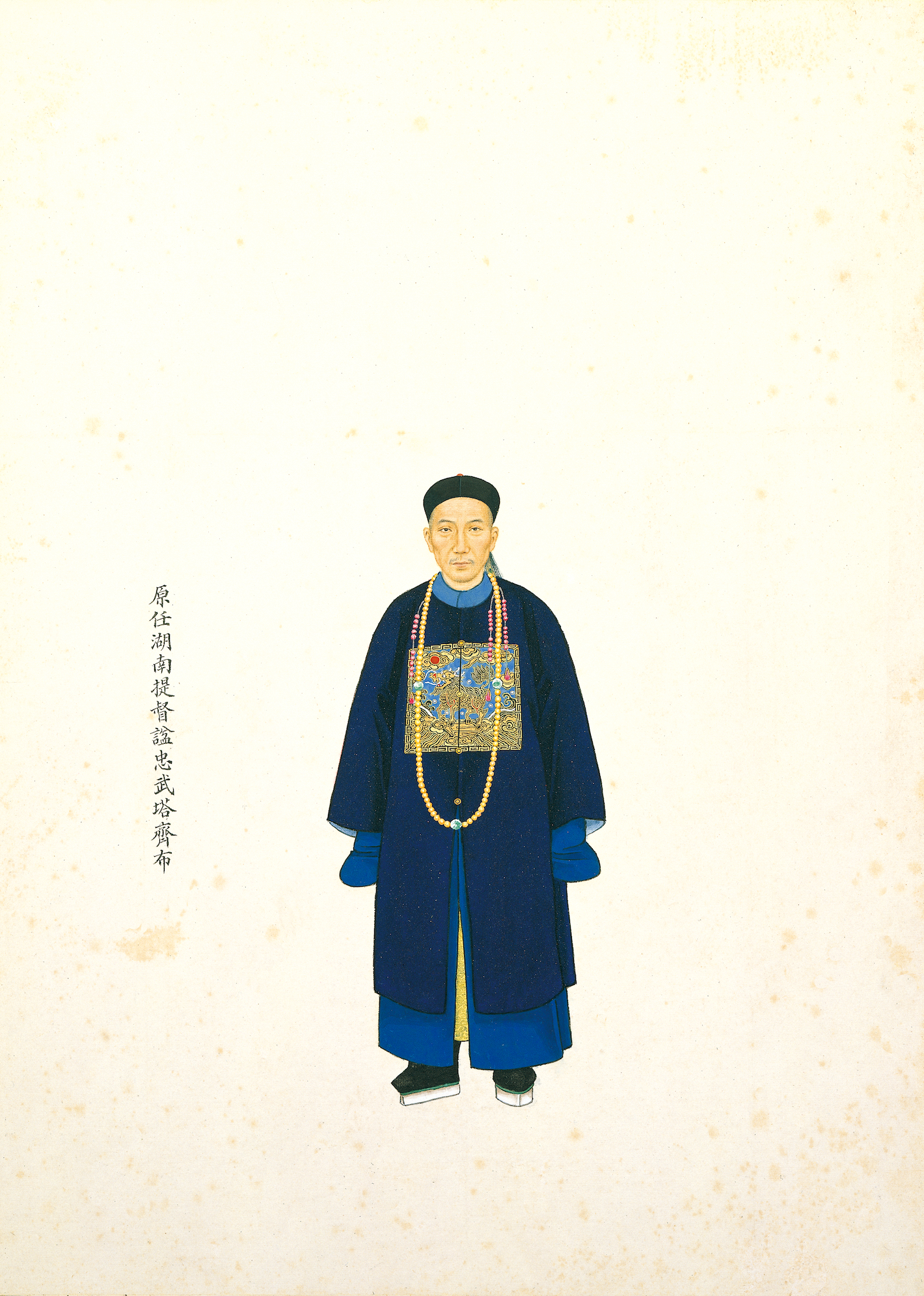
- Posthumously bestowed with the title of Third Lieutenant, Khatun Batulu, and Governor of Hunan Province.
- Born: 1816; Qing dynasty Beijing
- Died: 1855 (aged 38–39); Qing dynasty Jiangxi Province Jiujiang
- Military career
- Rank: Retainer → Third-class guard → Guerrilla → Vice general → Chief soldier → Provincial military commander of Hunan

Taqibu (Chinese: 塔齐布, Manchu: ᡨ᠋ᠠᠴᡳᠪᡠ, Möllendorff: Tacibu; 1816–1855), courtesy name Zhiting, member of the Tao Jia clan, a native of Manchuria's Bordered Yellow Banner, was promoted to the rank of retainer in his early years as an officer of the guards. Thereafter, he was expatriated to Hunan as a guerrilla. During this period, Taqibu's military talents were discovered by Zeng Guofan, and thus began to make a name for himself. On the recommendation of Zeng Guofan, Taqibu participated in the formation of the Hunan army and became Zeng Guofan's right-hand man. In the war with the Taiping Heavenly Kingdom, Taqibu led his troops to defeat the Taiping Army in Xiangtan, Yuezhou, Wuchang, and so on, and he was promoted to provincial military commander of Hunan, granted the title of Khatun Batulu Yong, and the position of riding lieutenant. In the war with the Taiping Heavenly Kingdom, Taqibu led his troops to defeat the Taiping Army in Xiangtan, Yuezhou, Wuchang, and so on, and he was promoted to governor of Hunan, granted the title of Khatun Batulu, and the position of cavalry lieutenant. Soon, Wuchang lost to the hands of the Taiping army, in the Qing army began to counterattack, the eve of the attack on Jiujiang, Taqibu died of illness due to exhaustion in the camp, the Qing court posthumously awarded the third-class lieutenant position.

History books describe Taqibu as "loyal and courageous", "wise and brave", his left arm tattooed with the words "loyalty to the country", and someone who can share the pain with the soldiers. In his spare time, he often talked with the soldiers about his family, and he cried every time he remembered his mother. When Taqibu was in combat, he carried a bow and arrows on his back, and two of his soldiers followed him with spears and lances, all of which were precise and accurate. In every battle, Taqibu went ahead on horseback, and he would save his friends when they were besieged, which made him known as "Ta Luo" with Luo Zenan, a Confucian general, in the Hunan army. At the end of the Qing Dynasty, the eight banners could not be used for the environment, Taqibu and Wulantai, Dolong, Du Xing, Shu Bao, etc. were the only a few know how to fight the army and good at fighting the generals of the banners.

== Biography ==
=== Rise to power ===
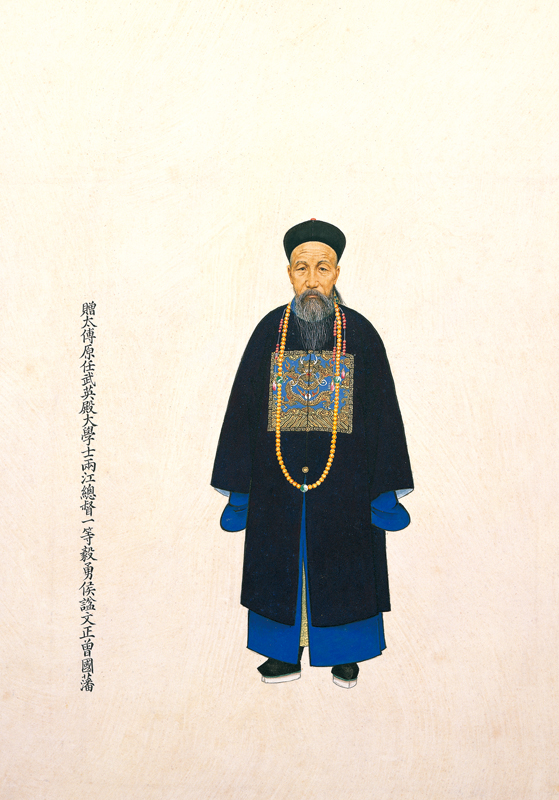
Zeng Guofan was the most important person in Taqibu's career.

Taqibu was born in one of the three camps outside the Beijing Banner Firearms Brigade, served as a retainer in his early years, and was later promoted to the third class guards. In the early years of Xianfeng, Taqibu was selected to be sent out to the Green Standard in Hunan, serving as a military authority, and also as a guard of the Zuoying. Soon after, he was promoted to the rank of guerrilla for the defense of Changsha, and served as a general of the Chinese army. At that time, Zeng Guofan was recruiting rural soldiers in his hometown in Hunan, and deployed his officers and soldiers for training every month. Taqibu accompanied him on every parade. Zeng Guofan discussed military affairs with him, and was surprised by his talent. He tested the troops under his command and found them to be particularly capable and neat. He was angered by Qingde's jealousy, who instigated Bao Qibao, the governor, to humiliate Taqibu. Zeng Guofan wrote a letter to dismiss Qingde and recommended Taqibu, saying that his "loyalty and bravery can be put to great use, and if he fails to fight well in the future, he will be willing to share the blame". Therefore, Taqibu was promoted to the rank of vice general, and also led the training army. The governor Zhang Liangji also recommended Taqibu as a vice-general.

=== Fame in Xianfeng ===
In 1853, Taqibu fought against the bandits in Chaling and Anhua, and was awarded the title of Huaying. In the fourth year of Xianfeng (1854), the troops were sent to fight against the Taiping Army. But traveling to Hubei Tongcheng, Chongyang, when the Taiping Army from Yuezhou and up, Taqibu was ordered to rescue Ningxiang. When the reinforcements were still on the way, Xiangtan was also captured by the Taiping army, so Taqibu changed to reinforce Xiangtan. The reinforcement army drove into the city and met with the Taiping army at Gaoling, Taqibu held a big flag and led his troops to attack the enemy army, Taqibu killed several enemy leaders and chased the Taiping army towards the bottom of the city. The next day, the main force of the Taiping army attacked from the city, Taqibu set up ambushes on both sides of the mountains, his first artillery killed more than a hundred enemy soldiers, and then ambushed and covered up the casualties, and the Taiping army suffered a great defeat. Qing sailors burned enemy ships in battle, the Taiping army had to abandon the city and left, and the Qing army took six days to recover Xiangtan. At that time, Zeng Guofan had just been defeated by the Taiping army in Jinggang, and Changsha was shaken by the defeat, and only by virtue of the victory of Xiangtan could the people's hearts be stabilized. When the news of the victory reached the capital, Taqibu was given the title of General Soldier and the title of Khatun Batulu. At the same time, the imperial edict reprimanded the governor of Hunan, Bao Qibao fear of war, and dismissed him from his post, and then promoted Taqibu to act as provincial military commander of Hunan, soon after the transfer. Previously, Taqibu's soldiers and Hunan Governor soldiers often had friction, and Taqibu's new office rewarded all the soldiers, to show that they do not care about the past, so the soldiers were happy and encouraging. Meanwhile, when they saw that Taqibu had risen to the rank of governor from the capital in only three years on the basis of his military service, they were all astonished, and the morale of the army was instantly uplifted.

=== Battles ===
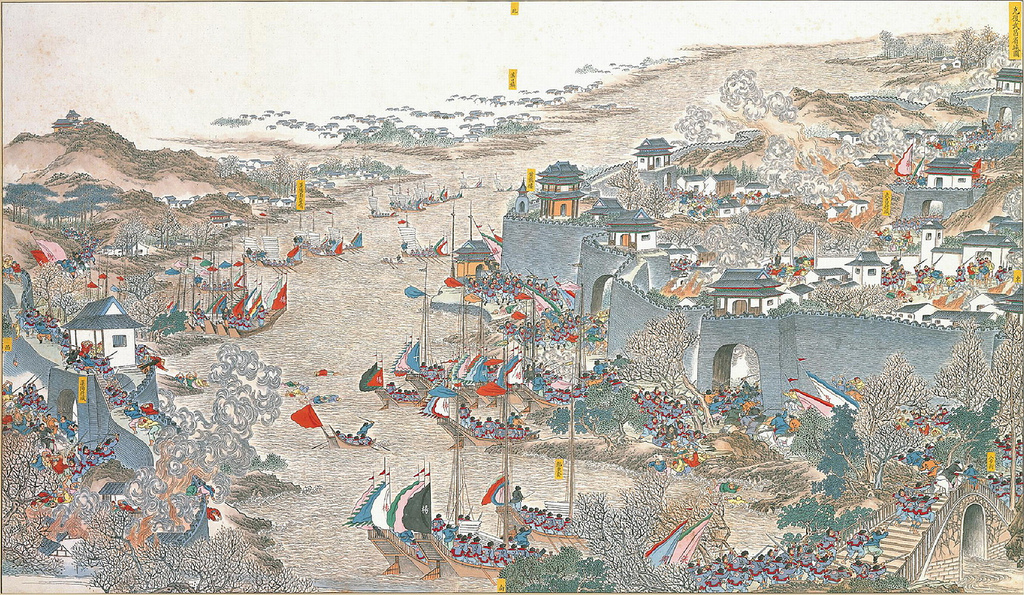
Battle of Wuchang

Since the Battle of Xiangtan, the Taiping Army retreated to Yuezhou, and lost some of its soldiers to attack Changzhou and Lizhou. Taqibu rushed reinforcements to the new wall, and Luo Zenan combined forces, together with the navy offensive in Yuezhou, in July, capturing the city of Yuezhou. The Taiping Army retreated to Chenglingji, still a huge army, and Zeng Guofan personally led the newly recruited naval division. The following day, the Taiping army went to Chenglingji and abandoned the ship on the shore in order to defend, the Qing army entered in three directions with Taqibu's troops, soldiers were brave to fight and kill, and broke through the middle of the Taiping army, the Taiping army tried to encircle them, but the Qing army became more and more courageous, so the Taiping army could not defeat the enemy and left. However, Taqibu chased them to the platform and killed eight hundred of his enemies, and countless people fell into the water. Taqibu and Luo Zenan combined their efforts to attack the enemy and won three victories in one day. The sailors took advantage of the victories and repelled the Taiping army in Yuezhou. In the Battle of Yuezhou, Taqibu encountered the Prime Minister of the Taiping Heavenly Kingdom, Zeng Tianyang. Huang Mingkui, a soldier, stabbed Zeng Tianyang off his horse, and Taqibu killed him in the process. Nevertheless, Taqibu had burned down Zeng Tianyang's ship and was reported as killed in the battle. Taqibu did not want to compete for the merit, so he did not report the incident.

In the intercalary month of July, Taqibu, together with Luo Zenan and Li Xubin, advanced into Gaoqiao and confronted the 20,000 Taiping defenders. Taqibu took the lead in the attack, followed by the rest of the soldiers. It was raining heavily, so the Taiping army's cannons could not be set ablaze, and the Qing army broke thirteen Taiping army camps, annihilating and dispersing thousands of Taiping troops. The navy cooperated with the land attack to fight the enemy, the Taiping army was defeated and the Qing army chased them for more than two hundred miles, destroying the already defeated army in Yangloudong and Chongyang, recovering Xianning. Zeng Guobin arrived at Jinkouhe and ordered Luo Zenan to attack the Huayuan and Taqibu to attack Hongshan. In August, the Taiping army lost Wuchang and Taqibu set up ambushes according to the terrain to attack the Taiping army, which was driven to the lakeside and drowned up to 8,000 or 9,000 people, Wuchang and Hankou were recovered by the Qing court at the same time and captured Daye.

In October, Taqibu and Luo Zenan attacked Tianjiazhen: Luo Zenan attacked Bangbishan, and Taqibu was in Fuchikou, separated by a small river. The two armies made a pontoon bridge to communicate with each other. The Taiping army fought with 10,000 men, Luo Zenan led Li Shubin to fight with them, and Taqibu fought against them across the harbor. The Taiping army also crossed the river from Tianjiazhen to attack the camp at Fuchikou, and was defeated by Taqibu. Taqibu, Luo Zenan and other sailors planned to attack while Yang Zaifu and Peng Yulin division destroyed the Taiping army cross the river, but land forces from half of the mountain surged, and the two sides fought for a day and night, then the Taiping army abandoned the barricades and left, the Qing army attacked the Tianjiazhen. Taqibu was given a yellow waistcoat and the title of Cavalry Lieutenant.

Thereafter, Taqibu and Luo Zenan crossed the river to Lianhua Bridge, encountering an ambush by the Taiping army, the advance troops were blocked and Taqibu beheaded the leader of the Taiping army in the battlefield, chasing them for 50 miles, and captured Guangji. The Taiping generals Qin Rigang, Chen Yucheng and Luo Dazhang guarded Huangmei and deployed tens of thousands of troops in Xiaochikou, the Kong post, the Dahe port, Longtouzhai and other places. Taqibu arrived at the Shuangcheng post and encountered the Taiping army attack, but the Qing army descended from the heights and defeated the Taiping army, and then defeated the Taiping army reinforcements at the Dahe port, killing more than 3,000 of the enemy. The Qing army attacked Huangmei and the both sides fought. Taqibu was hit by flying stones, and his face bled, but still insisted on supervising the battle, and finally captured Huangmei. The Qing army took advantage of the situation to pursue the attack, Taqibu from the southwest, and then broke into the Kong post. The Taiping army was defeated and guarded Xiaochikou, and then divided their troops to run to Hukou, forming an angle with the Jiujiang defenders. Zeng Guofan arrived in Jiujiang with a navy, so Taqibu and Luo Zenan crossed the river and attacked. In December, Taqibu's attack on the southwest gate of Jiujiang was unsuccessful, and Tong Tianyuan, the primus general of Taqibu, died in the battlefield. Coincidentally, the navy was also attacked by the Taiping army and lost some of its provisions. Luo Zenan attacked the Xiaochikou station, and Taqibu personally led twenty brave soldiers to supervise the battle. The Qing army was outnumbered, so Taqibu retreated for the battalion to cover. There were three yellow-clothed Taiping soldiers who went to attack directly, so Taqibu rode in a horse and surrounded and killed one of them, took his horse, and the rest of them retreated and dispersed, and when the Qing army was riding along the river, Taqibu returned to the camp, and then it was already the third drum of New Year's Eve.

=== Death ===
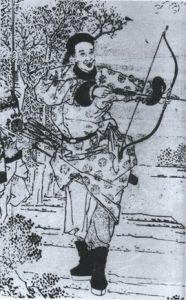
Taqibu

During the first month of the fifth year of the reign of Xianfeng (1855), Taqibu defeated the Taiping army of Jiujiang who attacked the city, killing more than 200 enemies and setting mines to trap and kill the Taiping army, and although he won a series of victories, he was unable to conquer the city of Jiujiang. In March, the governor of Hunan and Guangdong, Yang Ju, was defeated by the Taiping army, and the Qing court lost Wuchang again, so Taqibu could only send troops and generals back to help. At that time, half of the sailors stayed at Poyang Lake and half of them went back to Hubei, while the land division stayed to attack Jiujiang, but its strength was weak, so the resistance of the Taiping defenders became more and more fierce. In June, Taqibu and Zeng Guofan held a military meeting at the Qingshan and Zeng Guofan suggested that Taqibu should move his division to the east and attack Hukou, Dongliu, and Jiande, but Taqibu vowed to conquer Jiujiang. However, the following month, when the siege of the military order came, Taqibu died of exhaustion in the army, at the age of thirty-nine. Zeng Guofan, greatly lamented the death of Taqibu. The news reached Beijing, and the emperor Xianfeng issued an imperial edict in accordance with the general rank pension, and in the Hunan provincial city to build a special shrine, conferred posthumously to the devoted militar. In 1864 the Taiping Heavenly Kingdom fell, and the Qing court awarded Taqibu the title of third-class lieutenant position, enshrined in the Zhaozhong Ancestral Temple.

After his death, Taqibu was buried in the Firearms Brigade. In the early years of the Republic of China, an official whose father had been promoted by Taqibu found his descendants and repaired his grave.
