= Luo Zenan =

Chinese scholar and military leader

- 羅澤南
- Courtesy Name: 仲嶽 zhòng yuè
- Title: 羅山 luó shān

Personal details
- Born: 1807; Xiangxiang, Hunan
- Died: 1856

Luo Zenan (1807–1856) was a Neo-Confucian scholar of the late Qing dynasty Cheng–Zhu school born in Shiniuwanzhou, Xiangxiang, Hunan. He served as the chief envoy to Ningshaotai Road in Zhejiang. One of the founders of the Hunan Army, his disciples Li Xubin, Li Xuyi, Zeng Guoquan, Zeng Guohua, Jiang Yili, and Wang Hao were all generals of the Hunan Army. Together with Taqibu, he was known as "Ta Luo". In the sixth year of Xianfeng, he died in battle outside Wuchang City.

== Early years ==
His father died young, and his family was poor in his early years. "The family property was in ruins, and the walls were desolate." He could not afford ointment, so he still studied diligently by moonlight and burned rice husks in the middle of the night, or under the snow light on winter nights, and transferred to rural classrooms to teach apprentices. He had excellent knowledge and was a scholar in the scientific examination. In the first year of Xianfeng (1851), he was promoted to be filial, honest and upright. He was fond of studying the military books Zuo Zhuan and the I Ching.

== Founding of the Hunan Army ==
In 1852, the Taiping Army invaded Hunan, and Hunan gentry organized militia to protect themselves. Luo Zenan responded to the call of Xiangxiang County Magistrate Zhu Sunyi and took up arms, establishing the Hunan Army. He was successively promoted to the post of Zhejiang Ningshao Prefecture, and given the titles of Provincial Surveillance Commissioner and Provincial Administration Commissioner. He "captured 20 cities and fought more than 200 battles, large and small." Luo led his own army from 1853 to his death in 1856, fighting in Hunan, Jiangxi, and Hubei. He planned and recaptured Wuhan in eight days, and made outstanding military achievements. He was known as a "scholar-general" because he often told his soldiers about the Four Books and Five Classics during training, and once said that his military strategy was based on the phrase "knowing when to stop and then being determined" in the Great Learning.

== Killed in Action ==
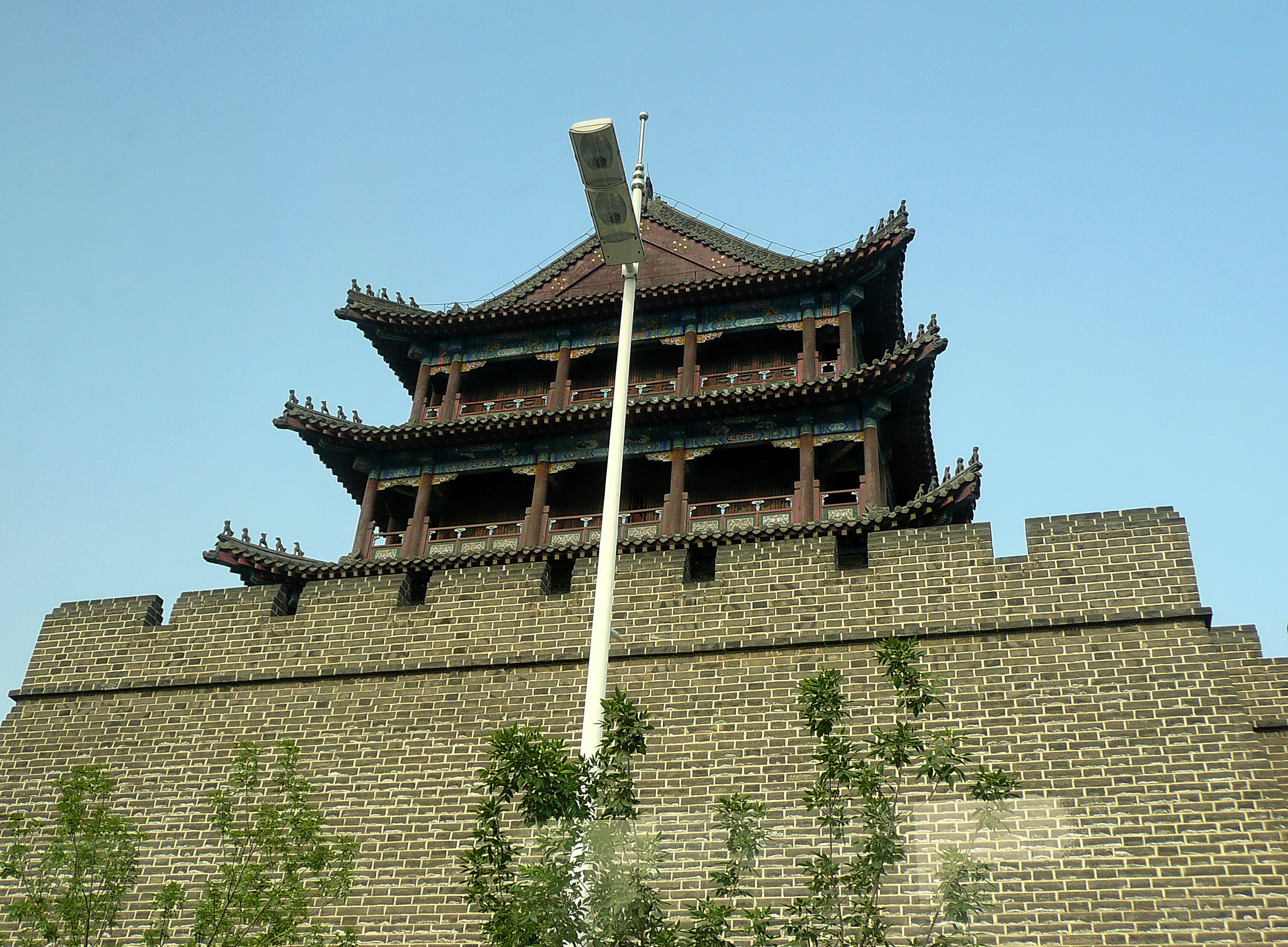
Dadong Gate of Wuchang

In the sixth year of Emperor Xianfeng's reign (1856), Luo participated in the Third Battle of Wuhan and defeated Taiping general Wei Jun. On the second day of March, Luo led his troops to chase and kill Wei Jun at the Dadong Gate of Wuchang. In the fog, he was shot by a young Taiping soldier with a bird gun. He still insisted on commanding the battle and retreating with his entire army. On March 8, Luo died of his injuries. More than two years after Luo Zenan's death, Zeng Guofan's third daughter Zeng Jichen married Luo Zenan's fifth son Luo Zhaosheng. The ceremony was held in the Golden Hall, and Zeng Guofan's wife Ouyang personally sent the bride off.
