= Gensoul =

Gensoul is a French surname. Notable people with the surname include:

- Joseph Gensoul (1797–1858), French surgeon
- Justin Gensoul (1781–1848), French playwright and chansonnier
- Marcel-Bruno Gensoul (1880–1973), French admiral
