= Jiang (rank) =

Rank held by general officers in some East Asian militaries

Chinese name
- Traditional Chinese: 將
- Simplified Chinese: 将
Transcriptions
Standard Mandarin
- Hanyu Pinyin: jiàng
- Wade–Giles: chiang

Vietnamese name
- Vietnamese alphabet: Tướng
- Chữ Hán: 將

Korean name
- Hangul: 장
- Hanja: 將
Transcriptions
- Revised Romanization: jang
- McCune–Reischauer: chang

Japanese name
- Kanji: 将
Transcriptions
- Romanization: shō

Jiang (formerly romanized chiang and usually translated general or, for navies, admiral) is a general officer (or flag officer for navies) rank used by China and Taiwan. It is also used as jang in North and South Korea, shō in Japan, and tướng in Vietnam.

== Chinese ==
=== People's Liberation Army ===
The same rank names are used for all services, prefixed by haijun (simplified Chinese: 海军; traditional Chinese: 海軍; lit. 'naval force') or kongjun (simplified Chinese: 空军; traditional Chinese: 空軍; lit. 'air force').

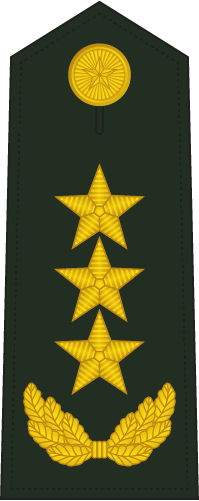
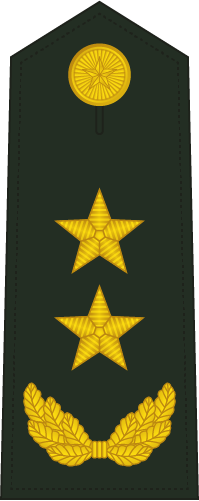
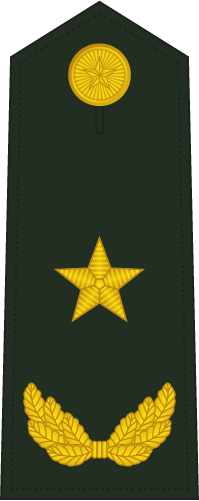
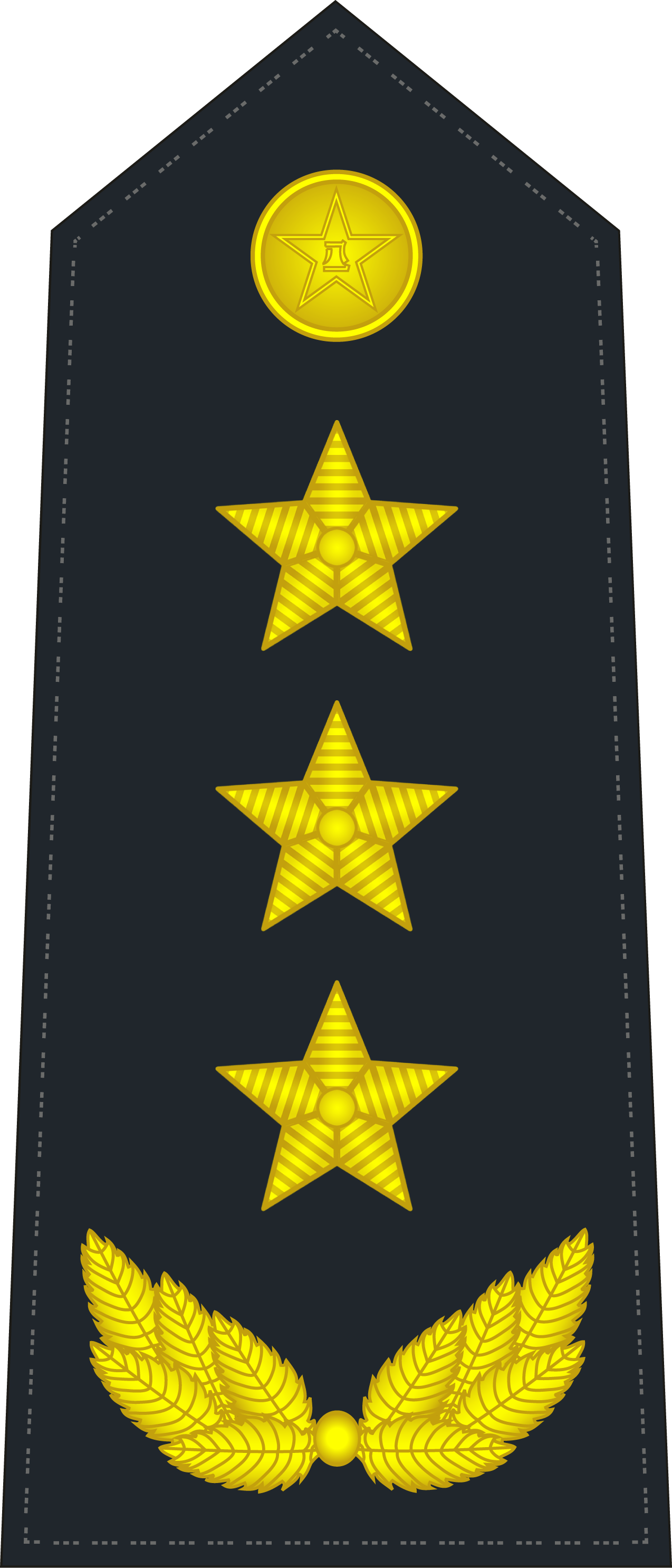
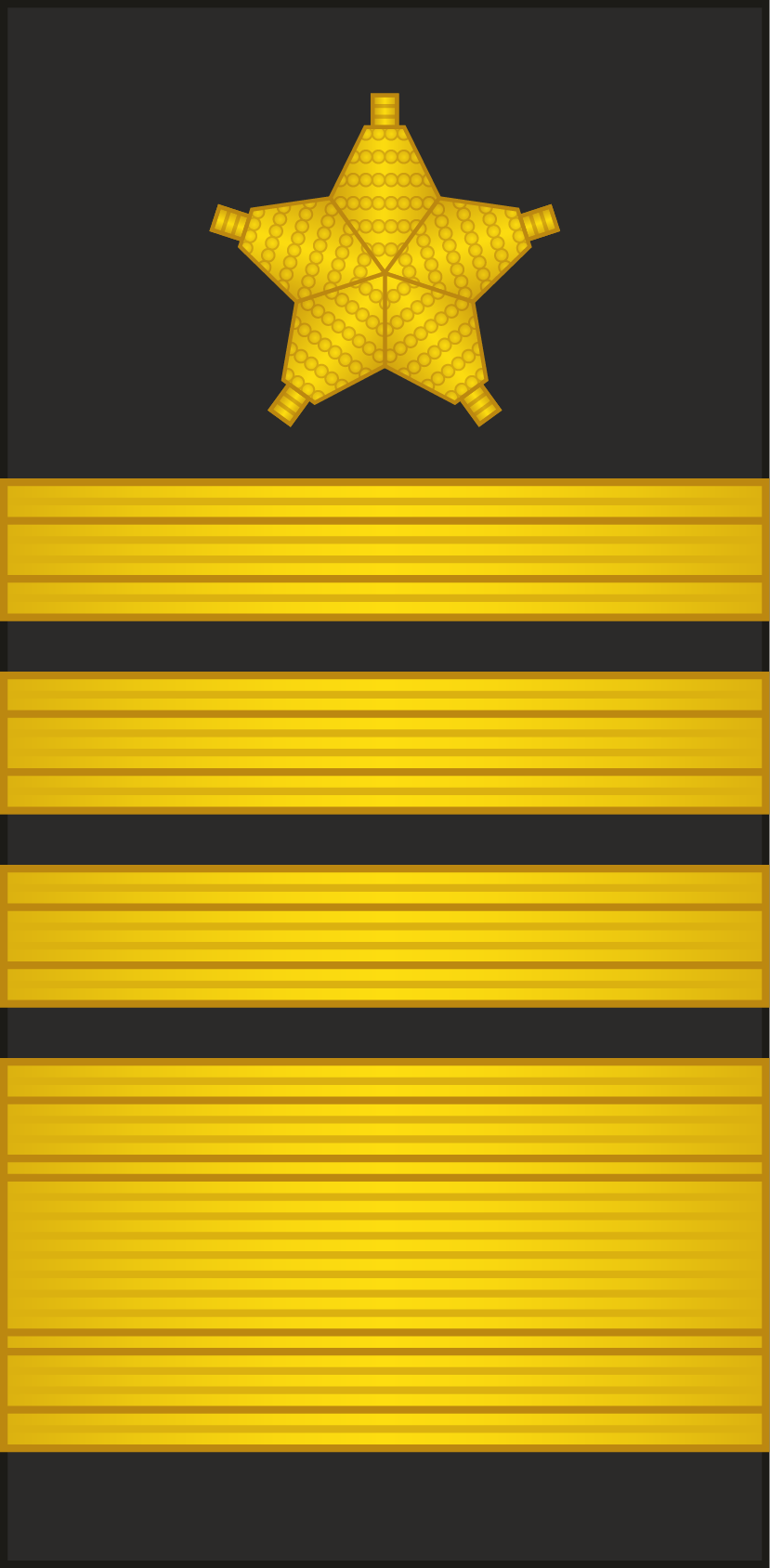
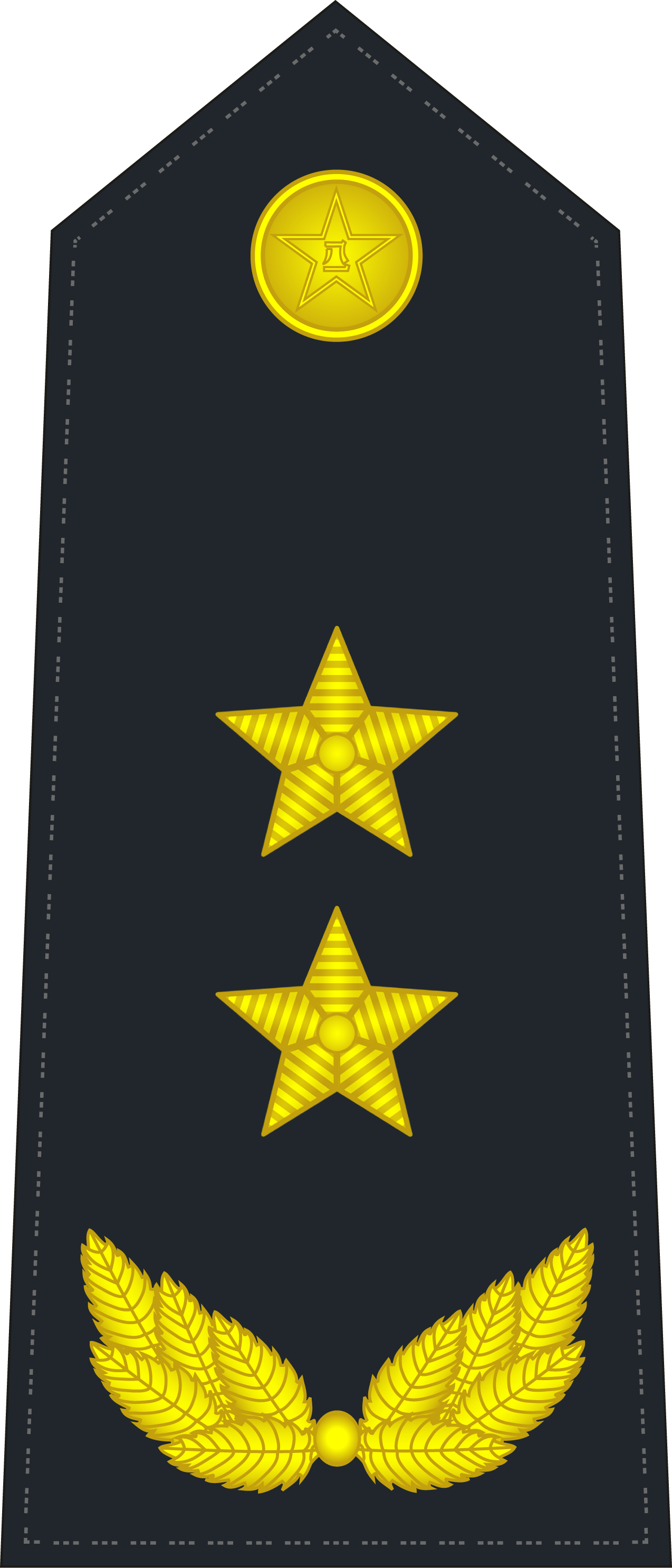
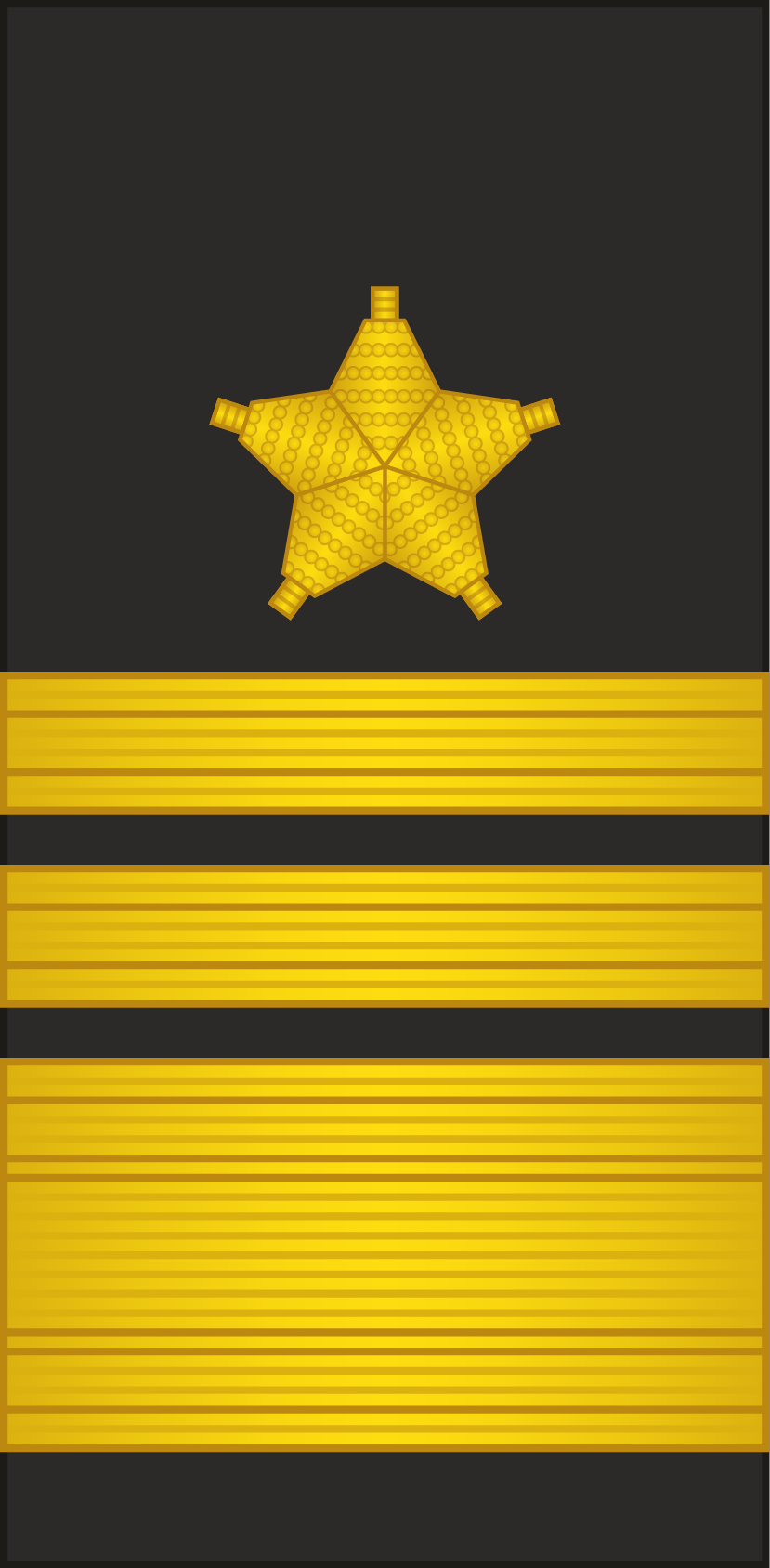
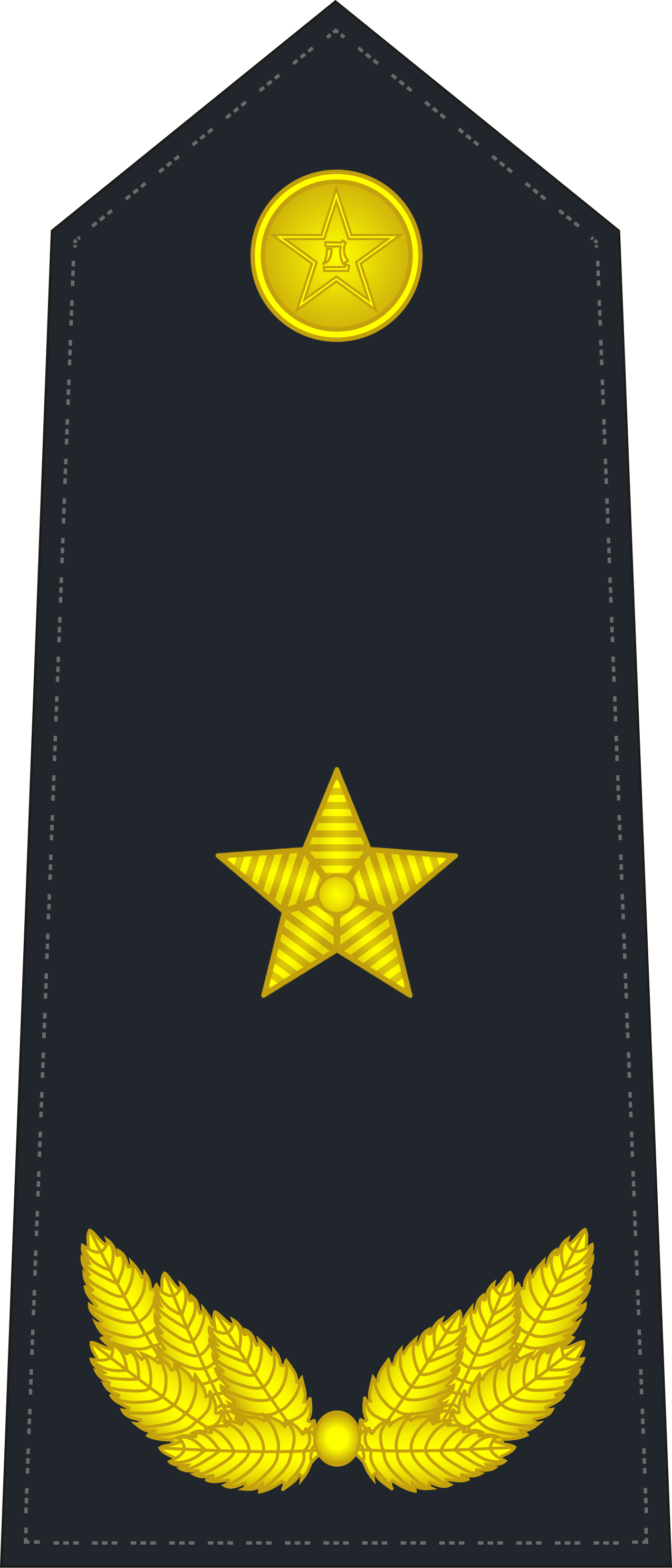
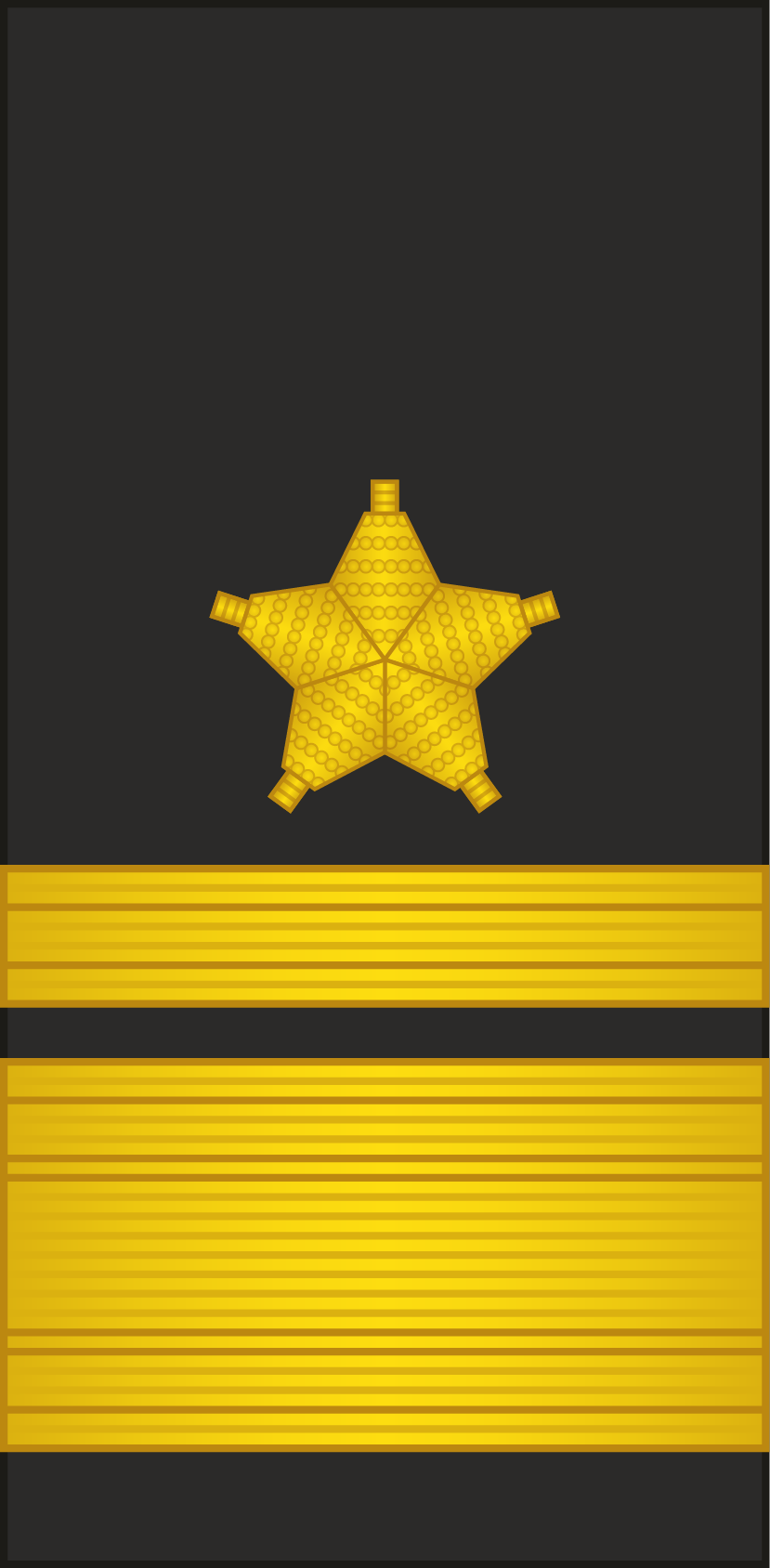
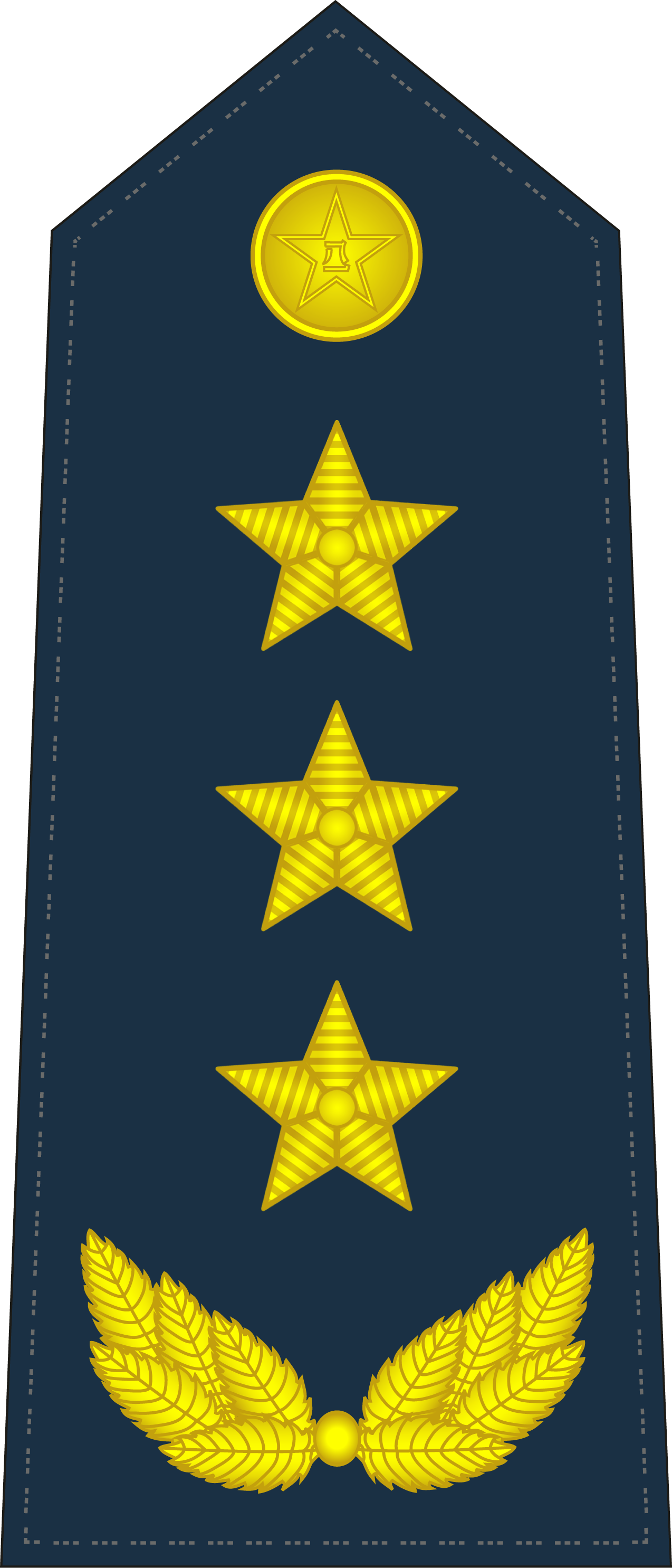
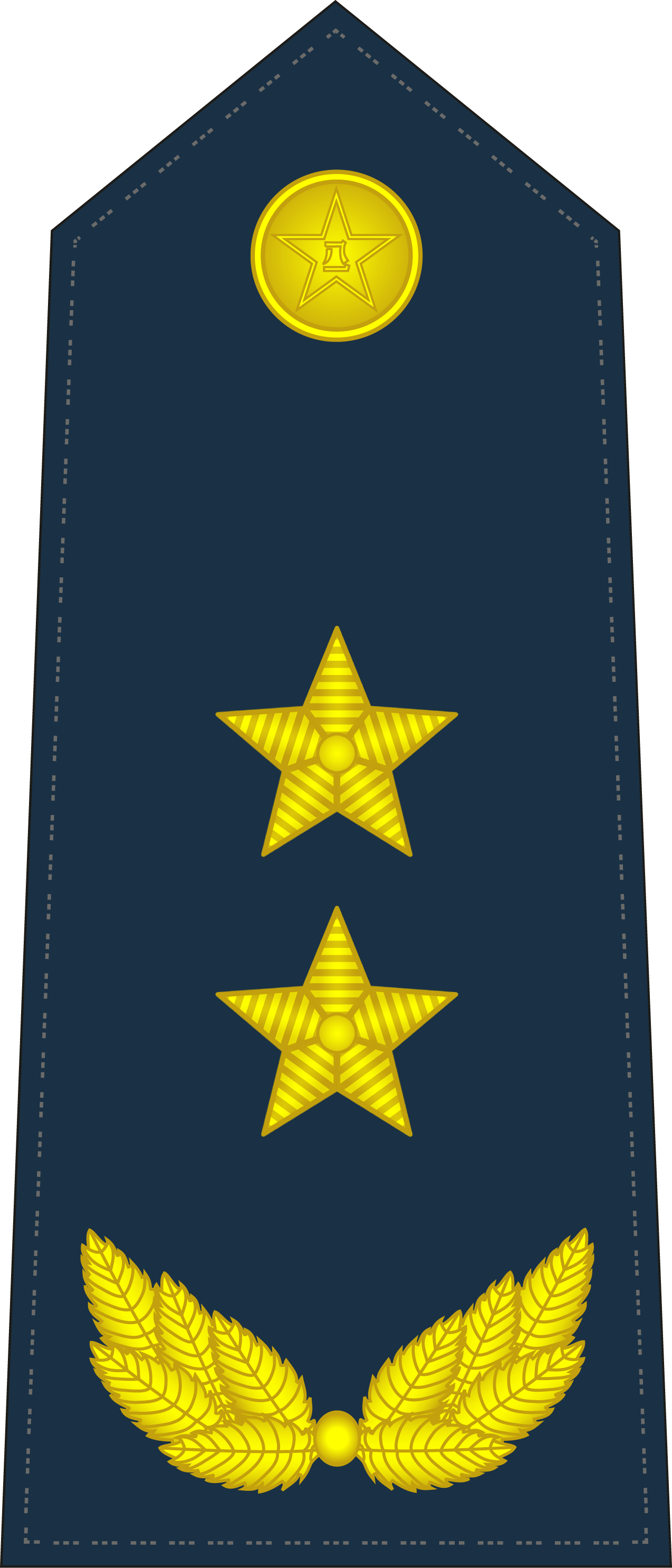
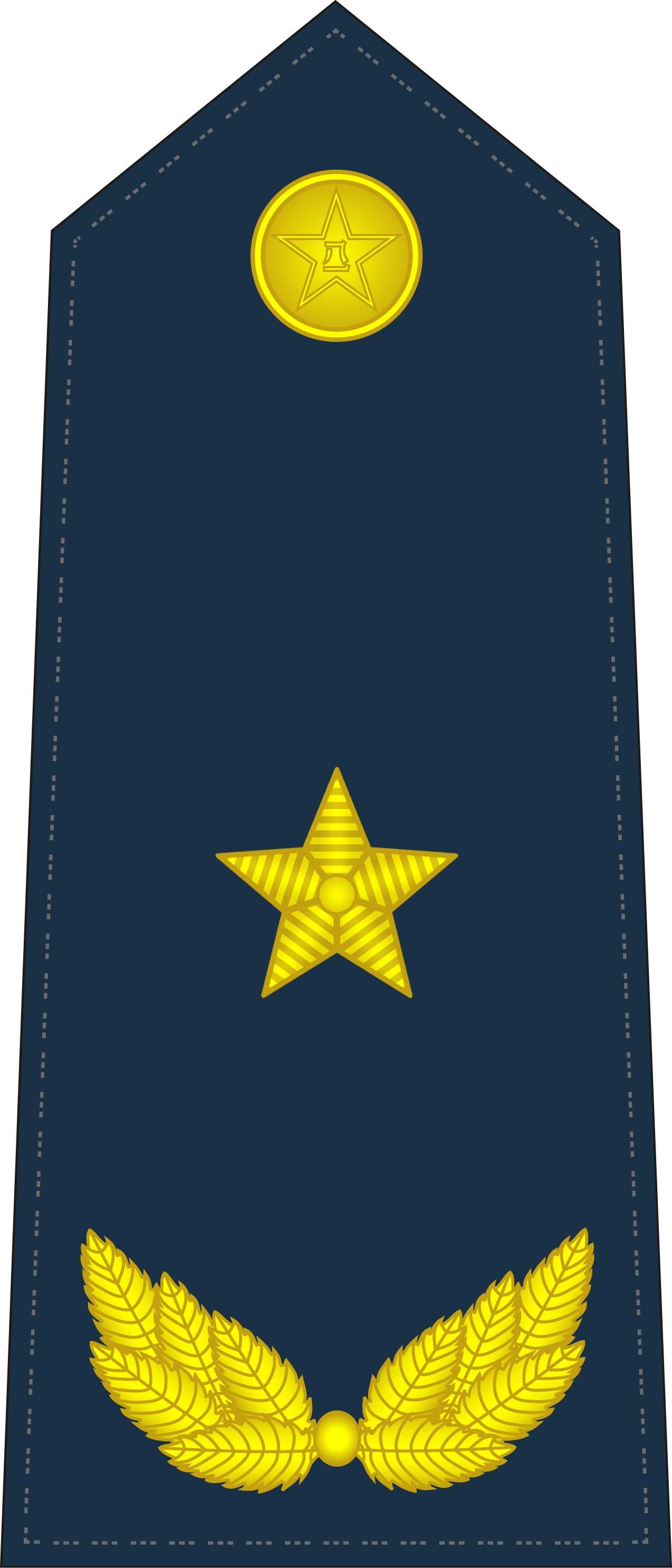
Rank group	General/flag officers
Chinese	上将	中将	少将
Pinyin	Shàngjiāng	Zhōngjiāng	Shàojiāng
Literal translation	Upper commander	Middle commander	Lower commander
PLA Ground Forces (Note: Same insignia for the Armed Police, Rocket Force, Aerospace Force, and Cyberspace Force.)
PLA Navy
PLA Air Force
	上将; Shàngjiāng	中将; Zhōngjiāng	少将; Shàojiāng
Rank group	General/flag officers

==== Dajiang ====
Under the rank system in place in the PLA in the era 1955–1965, there existed the rank of dajiang (Chinese: 大将; lit. 'Grand commander'). This rank was awarded to 10 of the veteran leaders of the PLA in 1955 and never conferred again. It was considered equivalent to the Soviet rank of army general. The decision to name the equivalent rank yiji shangjiang (Chinese: 一级上将; lit. 'Upper commander first class') when it was briefly re-established in 1988-1994 was likely due to a desire to keep the rank of dajiang an honorary one awarded after a war. It was offered to Deng Xiaoping who declined the new rank. Thus it was never conferred and scrapped in 1994.

=== Republic of China Armed Forces ===
Rank group	General/flag officers
Chinese	一級上將	二級上將	中將	少將
Pinyin	Yiji shangjiang	Erji shangjiang	Zhongjiang	Shaojiang
Literal translation	First class upper commander	Second class upper commander	Middle commander	Lower commander
Republic of China Army
Translation	Full general	General	Lieutenant general	Major general
ROC Military Police
Translation			Lieutenant general	Major general
Republic of China Navy
Translation	Full admiral	Admiral	Vice admiral	Rear admiral
Republic of China Air Force
Translation	Full general	General	Lieutenant general	Major general
Republic of China Marine Corps
Translation		General	Lieutenant general	Major general
	一級上將; Yiji shangjiang	二級上將; Erji shangjiang	中將; Zhongjiang	少將; Shaojiang
Rank group	General/flag officers

== Japanese variant ==
The same rank names are used for all services, prefixed by riku (Japanese: 陸, lit. 'land'), kai (Japanese: 海, lit. 'sea') or kū (Japanese: 空, lit. 'air'). The rank insignia of the Bakuryōchō-taru-shō (Japanese: 幕僚長たる将) was enacted on December 1, 1962, and before that, it was the same three-star as other Shō (Japanese: 将). The English notation of the Shō in the English version of the Defense White Paper until 2024 is as follows.

- Tōgōbakuryōchō-taru-Rikusho, Kaishõ,mata-ha Kũshō (Japanese: 統合幕僚長たる陸将、海将または空将) GEN, ADM or Gen serving as Chief of Staff Joint Staff Office.
- Rikujōbakuryōchō-taru-Rikushō (Japanese: 陸上幕僚長たる陸将) General serving as JGSDF Chief of Staff.
- Rikushō (Japanese: 陸将) General.
- Kaijōbakuryōchō-taru-Kaishō (Japanese: 海上幕僚長たる海将) Admiral serving as JMSDF Chief of Staff.
- Kaishō (Japanese: 海将) Vice Admiral.
- Kōkūbakuryōchō-taru-Kũshō (Japanese: 航空幕僚長たる空将) General serving as JASDF Chief of Staff.
- Kūshō (Japanese: 空将) General.

Rank group	General/flag officers
Japanese	幕僚長および統合作戦司令官たる将	将	将補
Romanization	Bakuryōchō-oyobi-Tōgōsakusenshireikan-taru-shō	Shō	Shō-ho
Literal translation	Commander serving as Chief of staff and Commander in chief of the JSDF Joint Operations Command	Commander	Supplementary commander
Japanese Army
U.S. equivalent	General	Lieutenant general	Major general
Japanese Navy
U.S. equivalent	Admiral	Vice admiral	Rear admiral
Japanese Air Force
U.S. equivalent	General	Lieutenant general	Major general
	幕僚長および統合作戦司令官たる将; Bakuryōchō-oyobi-Tōgōsakusenshireikan-taru-shō	将 Shō	将補; Shō-ho
Rank group	General/flag officers

== Korean variant ==
- Jang
- Hangul: 장
- Hanja: 將
- RR: jang
- MR: chang

=== North Korea ===
Rank group	General/flag officers
Hangul	대장	상장	중장	소장
Hanja	大將	上將	中將	少將
Romanization	Daejang	Sangjang	Chungjang	Sojang
Literal translation	Grand commander	Upper commander	Middle commander	Lower commander
Korean People's Army Ground Force
Korean People's Army Ground Force	Army general	Colonel general	Lieutenant general	Major general
Korean People's Navy
Korean People's Navy	Admiral of the Fleet	Admiral	Vice admiral	Rear admiral
Korean People's Army Air Force
Korean People's Army Air Force	Air Force general	Colonel general	Lieutenant general	Major general
	대장; Daejang	상장; Sangjang	중장; Chungjang	소장; Sojang
Rank group	General/flag officers

=== South Korea ===
Rank group	General/flag officers
Hangul	대장	중장	소장	준장
Hanja	大將	中將	少將	准將
Romanization	Daejang	Jungjang	Sojang	Junjang
Literal translation	Grand commander	Middle commander	Lower commander	Given commander
Armed Forces
English translation (Army)	General	Lieutenant general	Major general	Brigadier general
English translation (Navy)	Admiral	Vice admiral	Rear admiral	Rear admiral (lower half)
English translation (Air Force)	General	Lieutenant general	Major general	Brigadier general
English translation (Marine Corps)	General	Lieutenant general	Major general	Brigadier general
	대장; Daejang	중장; Jungjang	소장; Sojang	준장; Junjang
Rank group	General/flag officers

== Vietnamese variant ==
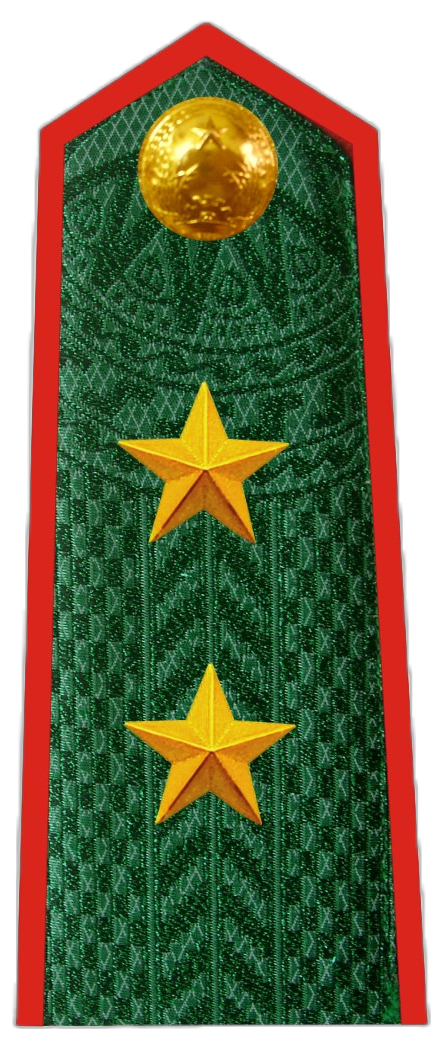
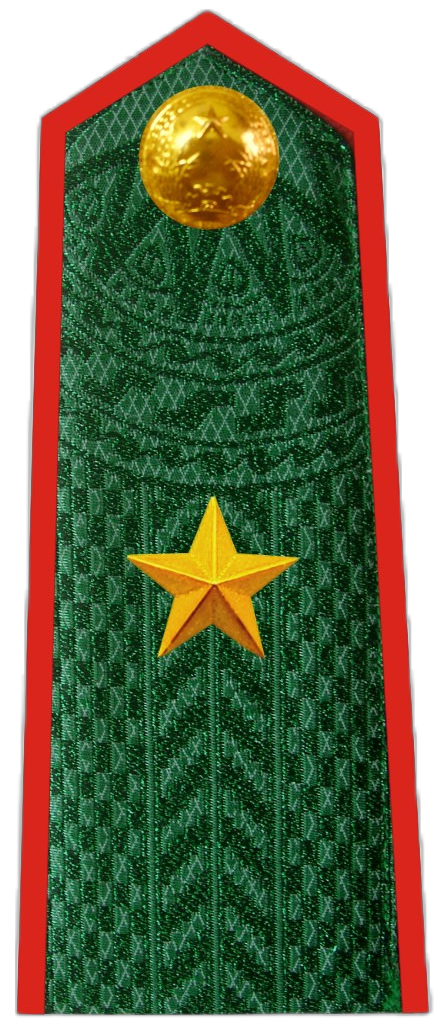
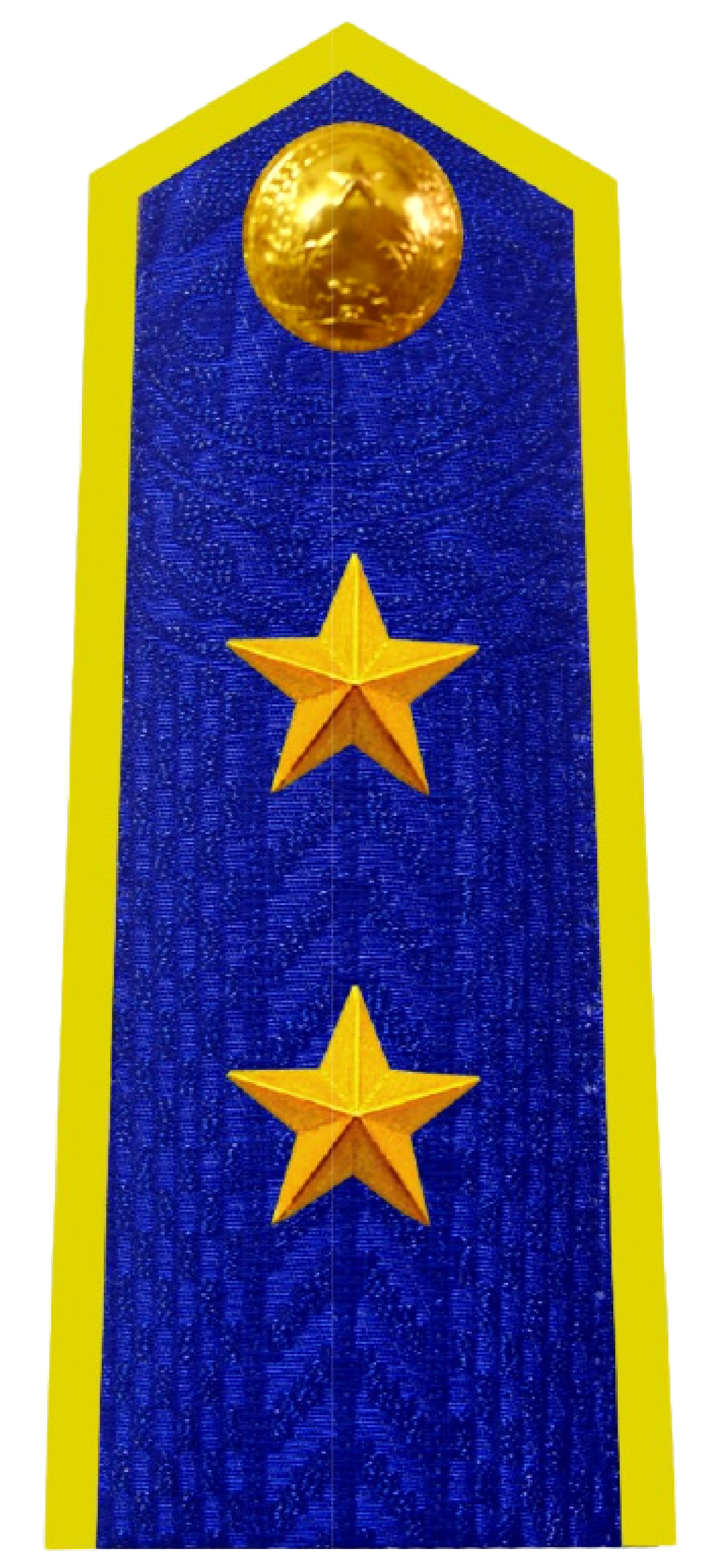
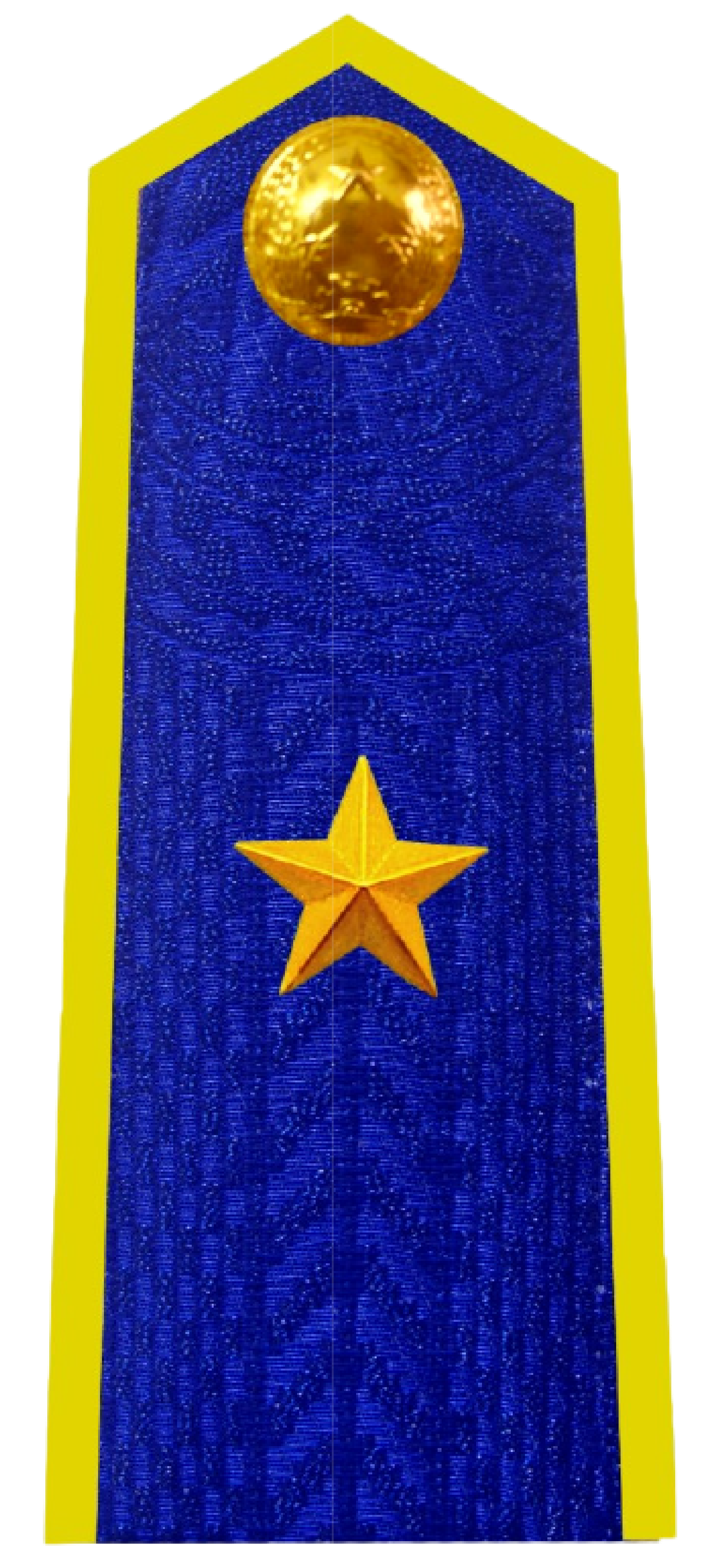
Rank group	General/flag officers
Vietnamese	Đại tướng	Thượng tướng	Trung tướng	Thiếu tướng
Chữ Hán	大將	上將	中將	少將
Literal translation	Grand general	Upper general	Middle general	Lower general
Vietnam People's Ground Force (Note: Same insignia for the Cyberspace Operations and Mausoleum Command.)
Translation	Army general	Colonel general	Lieutenant general	Major general
Vietnam People's Air Force
Translation		Colonel general	Lieutenant general	Major general
Vietnam Border Guard
Translation			Lieutenant general	Major general
Vietnam Coast Guard
Translation			Lieutenant general	Major general
Vietnamese	Đại tướng	Thượng tướng	Trung tướng	Thiếu tướng
Rank group	General/flag officers

=== South Vietnamese variant ===
Rank group	General/flag officers
Vietnamese	Thống tướng	Đại tướng	Trung tướng	Thiếu tướng	Chuẩn tướng
Chữ Hán	統將	大將	中將	少將	准將
Literal translation	Master general	Grand general	Middle general	Lower general	Quasi-general
Army of the Republic of Vietnam (1967–1975)
Translation	General of the Army	General	Lieutenant general	Major general	Brigadier general
Republic of Vietnam Marine Division (1967–1975)
Translation			Lieutenant general	Major general	Brigadier general
Republic of Vietnam Air Force (1967–1975)
Translation	General of the Air Force	General	Lieutenant general	Major general	Brigadier general
Vietnamese	Thống tướng	Đại tướng	Trung tướng	Thiếu tướng	Chuẩn tướng
Rank group	General/flag officers

==== Naval officer equivalent ====
Rank group	General/flag officers
Vietnamese	Thủy sư Đô đốc	Đô đốc	Phó đô đốc	Đề đốc	Phó đề đốc
Chữ Hán	水師都督	都督	副都督	提督	副提督
Literal translation	Military Governor of the Navy	Military Governor	Deputy Military Governor	Provincial Military Commander	Deputy Provincial Military Commander
Republic of Vietnam Navy (1967–1975)
Translation	Fleet Admiral	Admiral	Vice Admiral	Rear Admiral	Commodore
Vietnamese	Thủy sư Đô đốc	Đô đốc	Phó đô đốc	Đề đốc	Phó đề đốc
Rank group	General/flag officers

== See also ==
Ranks used in Chinese character-using countries

- General officer: Jiang (rank)
- Senior officer: Sa (rank), Xiao (rank), Lyeong
- Junior officer: Wei (rank)
- Non-commissioned officers: Shi (rank)
- Enlisted ranks: Bing (rank), Shi (rank)
