= Warren School of Articulation and Expression-Reading =

- New York City; United States

Information
- Established: 1893
- Founder: Lillie Eginton Warren

Warren School of Articulation and Expression-Reading (preceded by the Warren Articulation School, 1890–93) was an American school for deaf education. Founded in New York City in 1893 by Lillie Eginton Warren, it focused upon: defects of speech in children and adults; Instruction in articulation to children and adults who have artificial palates, or who have had operations upon the palate or nose; and adults who are growing deaf taught by a new method to read speech in the facial expressions of persons about them.

== History ==
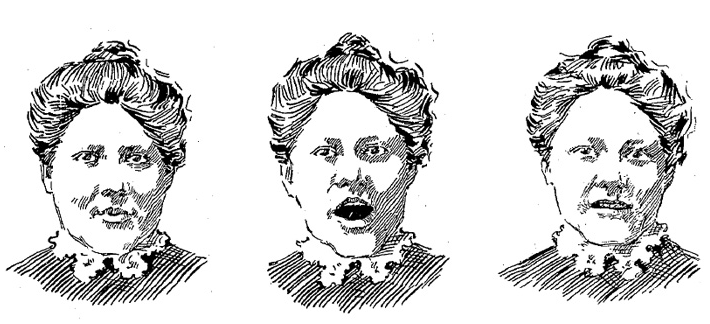
Images of facial expressions taught at the school.

The Warren School of Articulation and Expression-Reading was preceded by the Warren Articulation School (1890–93). The Warren Articulation School was opened in October, 1890. It grew out of an increased number of private pupils under Warren. The aim of the School was to develop the voice and give as exact articulation as possible. Children were admitted at the age of three years and even younger. Lessons of half an hour daily or every other day were given first, and the time was gradually lengthened. Six pupils formed a morning class, with a session of three hours. Each pupil received as much individual attention as would be given by a visiting governess, while the presence of other scholars imparted stimulus in no other way obtainable. All the pupils had special vocal and articulative exercises daily to give inflexions to the voice and ease of movement to the organs of speech. Effort was made to forget the pupils were deaf, with the view of making them appear as much as possible like hearing children. All the work of the Warren Articulation School was based on Bell's Visible Speech. Private instruction was given to adults who had become more or less deaf, and to hearing adults and children with stammer, stutter, lisp, nasalize, or other defects in speech.

The Warren School of Articulation and Expression-Reading was founded in 1893 by Lillie Eginton Warren. It was a private school, whose teaching method was patented. It was located in Manhattan at The Delaware, 243 West 2lst Street, later moving to 124 East 28th Street. Branch schools were established in Boston, Philadelphia, and Washington D.C. Hundreds were taught this new method of speech-reading in the first eight years.

Warren was assisted by Edward B. Nitchie, who, having become deaf at the age of fifteen, had been her pupil. Warren claimed that Nitchie plagiarized her methods after he published his first book, Self-Instruction in Lip-Reading. By 1903, they had gone separate ways, Nitchie founding his own school for deaf education in New York City.
