= Provincial military commander =

Historical Chinese military post

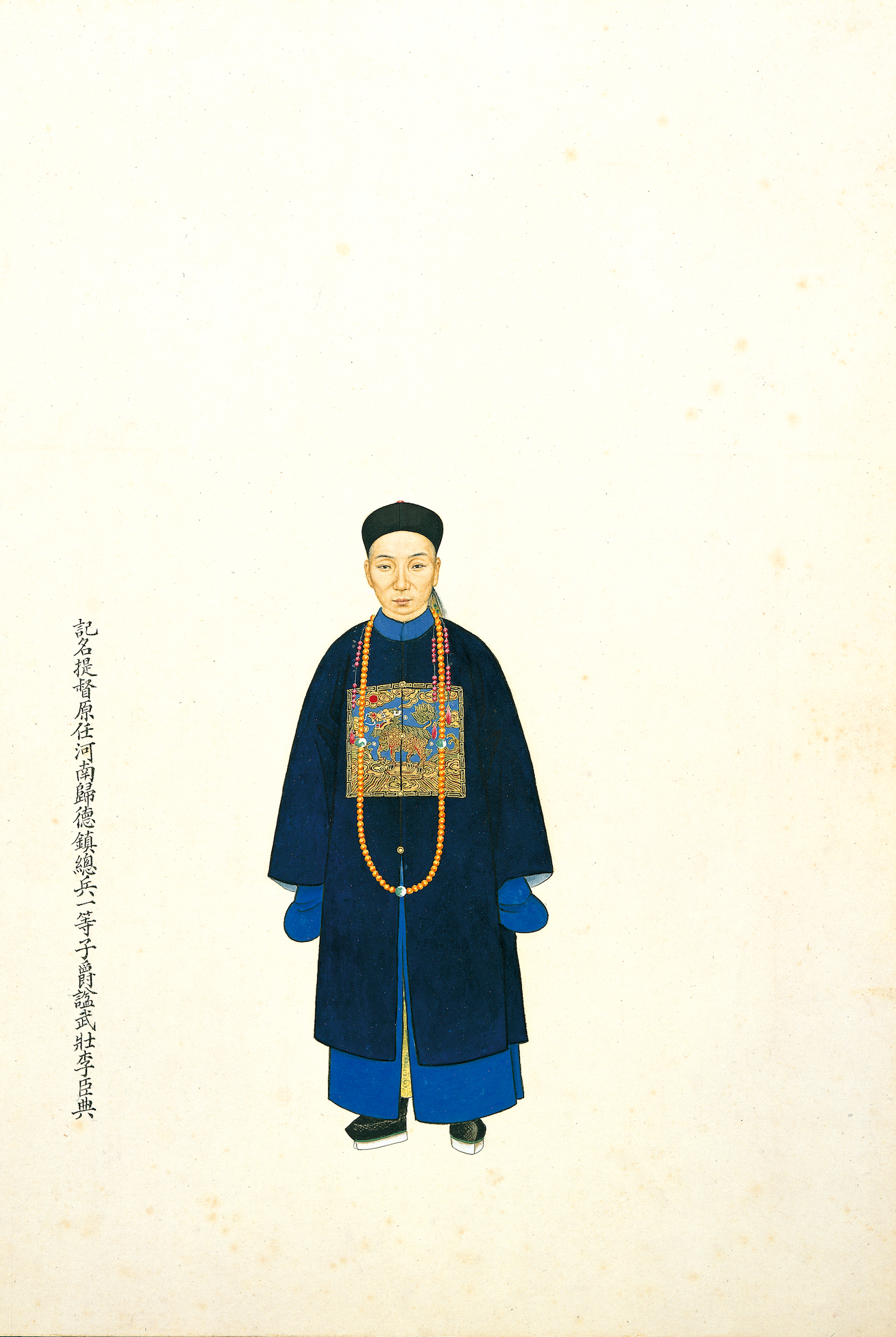
Li Chendian (1823–1864) was promoted to candidate of tidu during the war against Taiping Heavenly Kingdom

The provincial military commander (Chinese: 提督; pinyin: tídū) was the highest military official in the Chinese provinces of the Green Standards (綠營 lǜyíng) in Qing dynasty (1644–1911). There was usually one in each province, but sometimes there were two in a province which one in charge of the army and another on in charge of the navy (like Fujian). Under the jurisdiction of the provincial governor (巡撫 xúnfǔ) and sometimes a governor-general (總督), he was in charge of the Chinese military forces known as the Green Standards (綠營 lǜyíng), but had no control over the Eight Banners. The provincial military commander is also known as provincial commander-in-chief and general-in-chief.

== See also ==
- Taqibu
