= Lillie Eginton Warren =

American educator and deaf education inventor

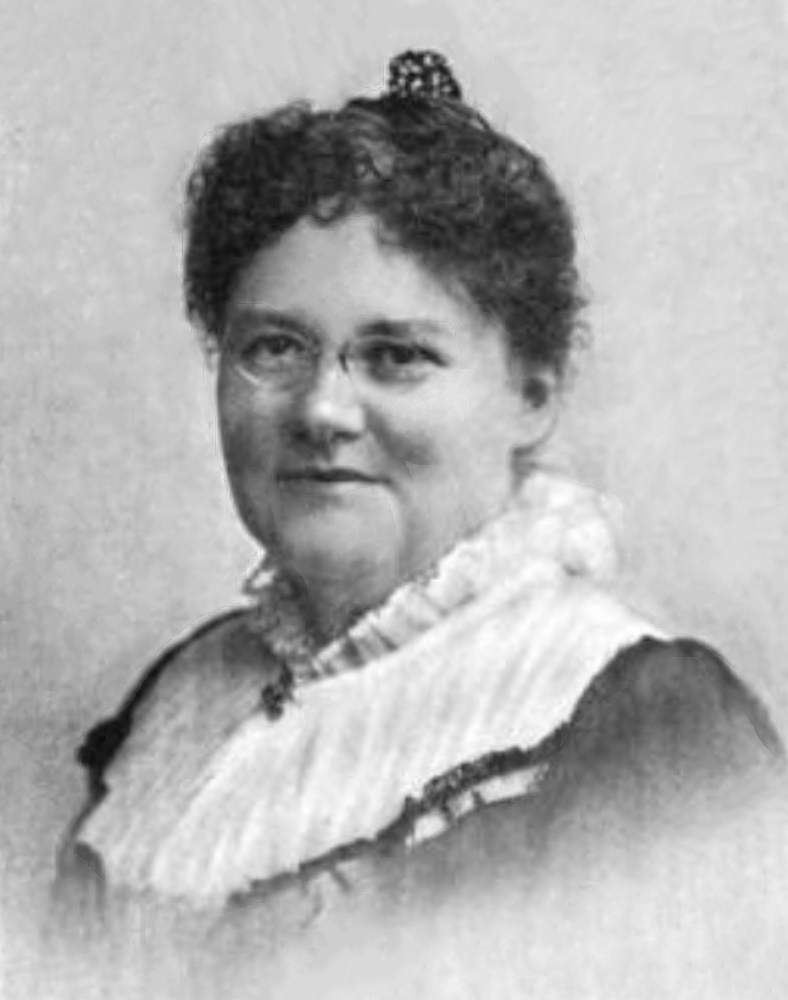
- Born: January 25, 1859; Newtonville, Massachusetts, U.S.
- Died: Unknown
- Occupations: Educator, author, school founder, inventor
- Writing career
- Language: English
- Subject: deaf education
- Notable works: Defective Speech and Deafness

Lillie Eginton Warren (January 25, 1859 – ?) was an American educator and an author of work upon defective speech. She was the inventor of the Warren Method of Expression Reading and Numerical Cipher. Until the 1890s, deaf education was limited to children, but Warren expanded the scope of work to adults. She was the inventor of a method of teaching hard-of-hearing adults to enjoy conversation, a system that was styled expression-reading and which was entirely different from any other method yet devised, a patent (#US726484A) being awarded Warren for her discovery by the United States Patent and Trademark Office in 1903. She devoted her life to the work, first taking it up in 1879. Warren was the founder and principal of the Warren School of Articulation and Expression-Reading, in New York City, an institution which had branches in Boston, Washington D.C., Philadelphia, and Chicago.

== Early life and education ==
Lillie Eginton Warren was born in Newtonville, Massachusetts, January 25, 1859. Her parents were Asa Coolidge Warren (1819–1904), a steel engraver, and Hannah Hoyt (of Waltham, Massachusetts). The couple had no children of their own and adopted Lillie early in infancy. She came to New York City in childhood.

She was educated in Twelfth Street School, New York City, and by private instruction, before attending the Normal College (later Hunter College).

== Career ==
=== Teacher ===
She began her life work in 1879, as a teacher of deaf-mute children. Besides teaching them to speak and to understand speech from the speaker's face, she had considerable success in developing a dormant sense of hearing. In 1892, she opened her School of Articulation, not only for deaf children, but for all with defects of speech. This method was a patented series of pictures of the expressions of the facial muscles produced by articulate speech by which it was possible for a deaf person to understand conversation by the eyes alone. Edward Nichie was her assistant.

The year 1893 was marked by the invention of a method of Expression Reading, the thing that made her name noteworthy. This was a much simplified method of teaching to the adult hard-of-hearing what is commonly called "lip-reading." In her work with the child, Warren found that the forty-odd sounds of the English language were revealed in sixteen outward manifestations. Though the organs of articulation were more or less hidden, their activity produced certain definite effects on the muscles of the face. These effects or pictures the student memorized, learning to associate each with its proper sound. Practice enabled the eye to follow the changing of one into the other, thus perceiving words and sentences. In this way, the adult was saved from spending many hours in studying articulative movements, and was put directly in communication with other persons. This invention made Warren at once a leader in her chosen work. She first spoke in public regarding the new method at a Chautauqua meeting in July, 1894. After the publication of Defective Speech and Deafness, the work of the school developed rapidly.

She was also principal of the Warren Correspondence School. Warren was a member of the American association to promote the teaching of speech to the deaf.

=== Writer ===
Warren's book, Defective Speech and Deafness (Edgar S. Werner, New York, 1895), was well received. Professor Alexander Melville Bell, the inventor of Visible Speech, said of it:— "The work shows a complete mastery of the subject, and it cannot but prove directly valuable to parents and teachers." The scope of the book was comprehensive. It treated the deaf-mute and the stammerer; the very young deaf child; teaching the mute to speak: the child suddenly deaf and the child growing deaf slowly; how the hard-of-hearing adult may enjoy conversation; dullness of pupils owing to defective hearing; and lisping and careless speech in general. A review by The New York Times began with:— "This volume is written by one well versed not alone in theory, but one who has had many years of practical experience in teaching the deaf, but not necessarily dumb, how to speak."

This book showed that fluent speech may be obtained and understood by those with the different phases of deafness and the different degrees of imperfect speech. It was not a textbook, but, in effect, an essay showing the importance of prompt attention in order that they may understand and make themselves understood in conversation.

Among her other works was Warren Method Applied to French, German and Italian. The general address of European schools was, American & Colonial Exchange, Carlton Street, Regent Street, S. W., London.

=== Inventor ===
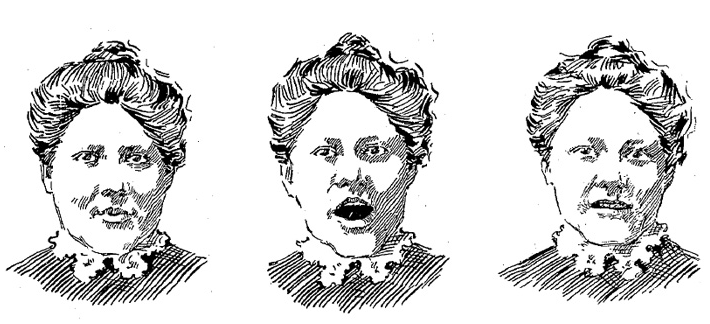
Patent's series of images.

In 1903, Warren received patent #US726484A for "Means for Teaching the Reading of the Facial Expressions which Occur in Speaking". Filed in 1902, it claimed:— "An improved means for teaching the reading of expressions accompanying the utterance of speech, the same consisting of a series of pictures of the human face, such pictures representing respectively the various expressions occurring in the utterance of the elementary sounds composing words, said pictures bearing each its appropriate arbitrary mark; in combination with a schedule of such marks singly or in groups, each of said marks or groups being in collocation with the word, the element or elements of which are indicated by the said marks appropriate to the expressions they indicate, all substantially as described."

== Selected works ==
- Birds of the Sacred Scriptures. Their correspondence and signification., 1880
- Speech revealed by the facial expression, 189?
- Teaching deaf children to hear, 1892
- Defective speech and deafness, 1895
- The Warren method of expression reading with numerical cipher, 1898
- Facts regarding St. Peter's. By an American resident of Rome, 1911
