= Joseph Gensoul =

French surgeon (1797–1858)

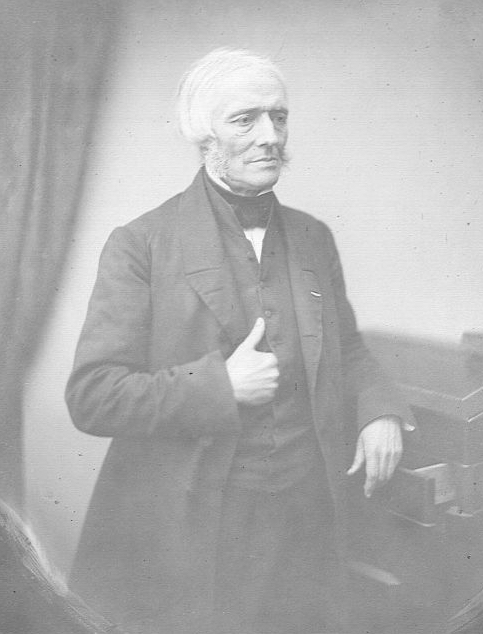
Joseph Gensoul

Joseph Gensoul (1 August 1797 – 11 May 1858) was a French surgeon. He was a pioneer of ophthalmological, otorhinolaryngological, oral and maxillofacial surgery.

He studied at Lyon and Paris, earning his doctorate in 1824. In 1826 he was appointed chief surgeon at the Hôtel-Dieu of Lyon.

He is remembered for introducing corneal cauterization, and is credited for making improvements in regards to techniques in rhinoplastic and cleft palate surgery. He also developed a cautery process for varices and a catheterization procedure for applying silver nitrate into the nasal canal.

== Writings ==
- Lettre chirurgicale sur quelques maladies graves du sinus maxillaire et de l'os maxillaire inférieur, 1823 - Surgical paper on some serious diseases of the maxillary sinus and inferior maxillary bone.
- Essai sur la réunion immédiate des plaies après l'amputation des membres, 1824 - Essay on the immediate cauterization of wounds after amputation.
- Sur le mécanisme de la vision, 1851 - On the mechanics of vision.
