= Li Xubin =

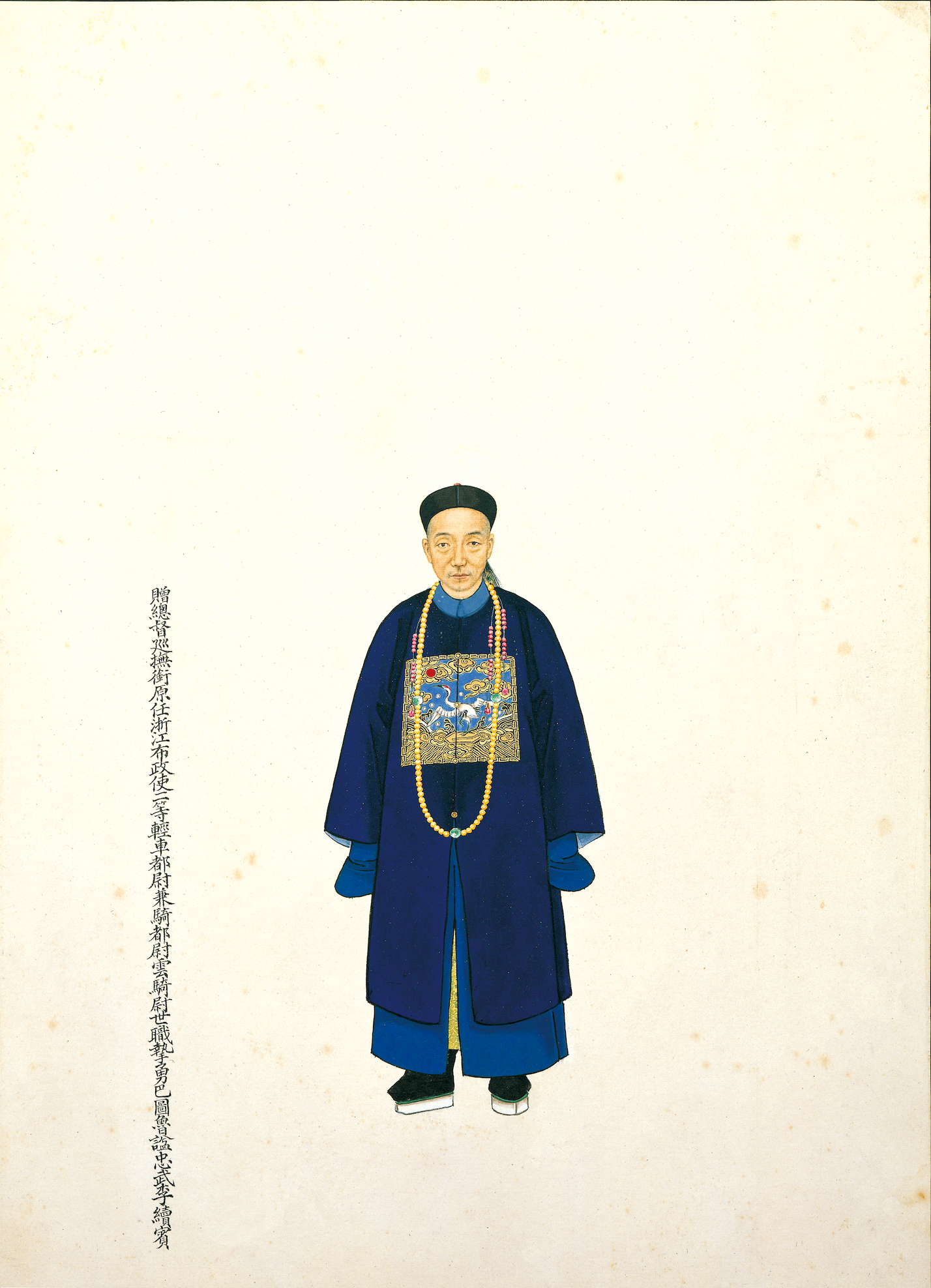
Li Xubin

Li Xubin (simplified Chinese: 李续宾; traditional Chinese: 李續賓; pinyin: Lǐ Xùbīn; Wade–Giles: Li Hsu-pin; 1817 – November 16, 1858), courtesy names Di'an (迪庵) and Kehui (克惠), posthumous name Zhongwu (忠武), was a Chinese military general of the Qing dynasty. He was a commander of the Xiang Army, a military force raised by the Qing government to help the imperial forces in suppressing the Taiping Rebellion. His younger brother, Li Xuyi (李續宜; 1822–1863), was also a commander in the Xiang Army.

Born in Hunan province to a minor prosperous family, Li Xubin enlisted in the Hunan militia in 1852 (later becoming known as the Xiang Army; "Xiang" was another name for Hunan). Within four years, Li Xubin became a veteran combat leader with a reputation as an aggressive and resourceful officer. After leading the Xiang Army in a successful assault against the Taiping rebels' stronghold of Wuchang in December 1856, he repelled several rebel counterattacks by using tactics such as the construction of a series of water-filled trenches.

Advancing down the Yangtze Valley in early-1858, Li Xubin's forces occupied the surrounding area of Jiujiang before capturing the city on May 19. In an offensive to recapture Anhui province from the Taiping rebels, Li Xubin was eventually killed in action while leading an attack on the rebel-controlled Sanhe Town (三河镇) on November 16, 1858.
