= Military history of China before 1912 =

Chinese military before 1912
- Leader: Emperor of China
- Dates active: c. 1900 BC – 1911
- Active regions: East Asia; Southeast Asia; Central Asia; North Asia
- Part of: Chinese Empire
- Wars: List of Chinese wars and battles

The recorded military history of China extends from about 2200 BC to the present day. Chinese pioneered the use of crossbows, advanced metallurgical standardization for arms and armor, early gunpowder weapons, and other advanced weapons, but also adopted nomadic cavalry and Western military technology. China's armies also benefited from an advanced logistics system as well as a rich strategic tradition, beginning with Sun Tzu's The Art of War, that deeply influenced military thought.

== History of military organization ==
The military history of China stretches from roughly 1900 BC to the present day. Chinese armies were advanced and powerful, especially after the Warring States period. armies were tasked with the twofold goal of defending China and her subject peoples from foreign intruders, and with expanding China's territory and influence across Asia.

=== Pre-Warring States Period ===
Early Chinese armies were relatively small affairs. Composed of peasant levies, usually serfs dependent upon the king or the feudal lord of their home state, these armies were relatively ill-equipped. While organized military forces existed along with the state, few records remain of these early armies. These armies were centered around the chariot-riding nobility, who played a role akin to the European knight as they were the main fighting force of the army. Bronze weapons such as spears and swords were the main equipment of both the infantry and charioteers. These armies were ill-trained and haphazardly supplied, meaning that they could not campaign for more than a few months and often had to give up their gains due to lack of supplies. The shi knights had a strict code of chivalry. During the Shang and Western Zhou eras, warfare was seen as an aristocratic affair, complete with protocols that may be compared to the chivalry of the European knight.

Under the Shang and Zhou, these armies were able to expand China's territory and influence from a narrow part of the Yellow River valley to all of the North China plain. Equipped with bronze weapons, bows, and armor, these armies won victories against the sedentary Dongyi to the East and South, which were the main direction of expansion, as well as defending the western border against the nomadic incursions of the Xirong. However, after the collapse of the Zhou dynasty in 771 BC when the Xirong captured its capital Haojing, China collapsed into a plethora of small states, who warred frequently with each other. The competition between these states would eventually produce the professional armies that marked the Imperial Era of China.

==== Prehistory and Shang dynasty ====
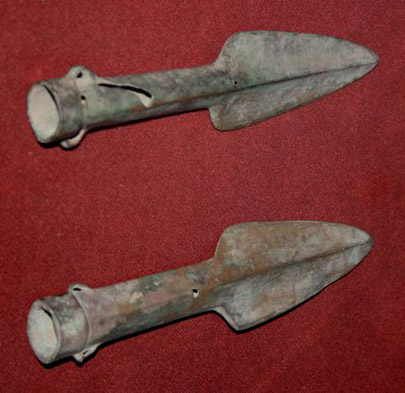
Shang dynasty bronze spearheads

Early Bronze Age Chinese cities were characterized by massive defensive walls. The Erlitou culture's bronze workshops probably gave it a decisive edge over competing groups. Armies were probably relatively ineffective given the prevalence of extensive fortifications, although the Erlitou culture probably succeeded in breaching these occasionally since they were able to expand the area of their control. Starting from the 3rd Millennium BC and throughout the 2nd Millennium BC, there is a correlation between elite status and military status in tomb artefacts.

==== Western Zhou and Spring and Autumn period ====
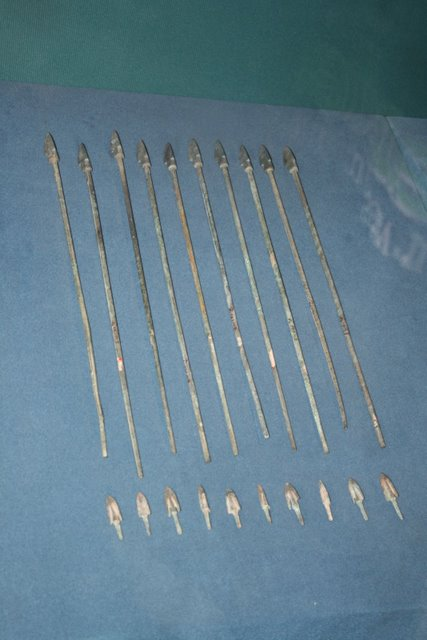
Spring and Autumn period bronze arrows

While chariots had been used in battle previously, only in the Western Zhou era were they used in large numbers. The Zhou conquest of the Shang may have been linked to their use of the chariot. Under the Shang, chariots were extremely ornate, used by high ranking elite as command and archery platforms, but under the Zhou chariots were simpler and more common. The ratio of chariots to foot soldiers under the Shang is estimated to be 1 to 30, while under the Zhou it is estimated to be 1 to 10. However this was still limited as compared to the 1 to 5 in Ancient Egypt.

In the Spring and Autumn period, archery switched from targeted shooting to massed volleys. By the end of the Spring and Autumn period, cavalry had appeared on the battlefield, and the chariot would gradually revert to being a command platform in the course of the ensuing Warring States period.

=== Warring States ===
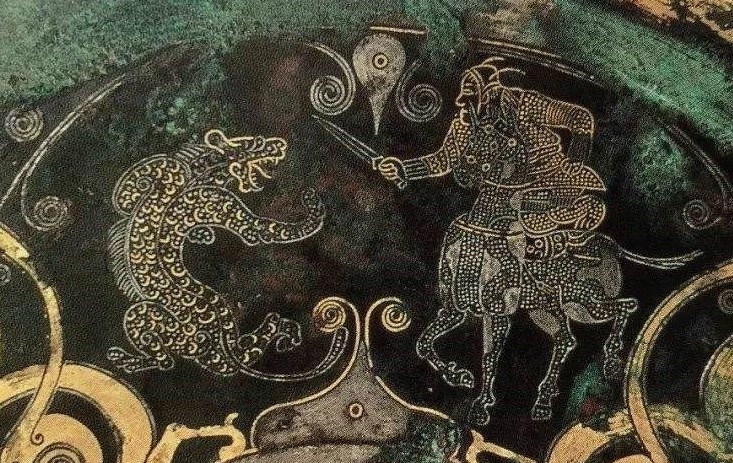
A horse-rider fighting a tiger, depicted on a gilded mirror discovered in Jincun, Luoyang.

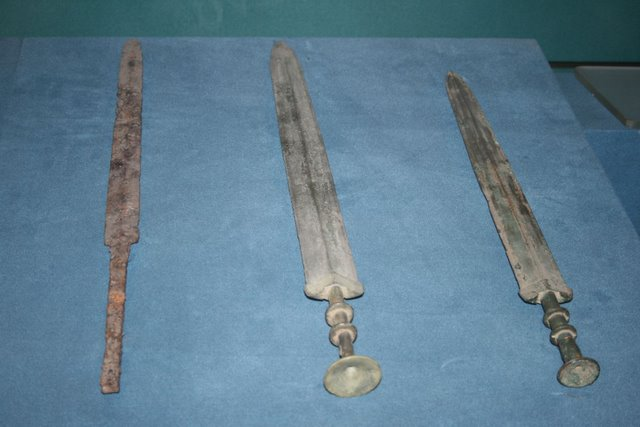
An iron sword and two bronze swords from the Warring States period (403–221 BC)

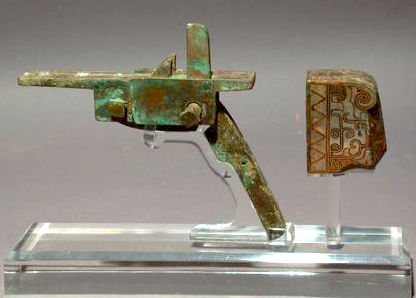
A bronze crossbow mechanism with a butt plate, from the late Warring States to early Han dynasty (202 BC – 220 AD)

By the time of the Warring States, reforms began that abolished feudalism and created powerful, centralized states. The power of the aristocracy was curbed and for the first time, professional generals were appointed on merit, rather than birth. Technological advances such as iron weapons and crossbows put the chariot-riding nobility out of business and favored large, professional standing armies, who were well-supplied and could fight a sustained campaign. The size of armies increased; whereas before 500 BC Chinese field armies numbered in the tens of thousands, by 300 BC armies regularly included up to a couple of hundred thousand drafted soldiers, accompanied by cavalry. For example, during the Battle of Changping the state of Qin drafted all males over 15 years of age. Although these conscripts with one to two years of training would be no match individually against aristocratic warriors with years of experience, they made up for it with superior standardization, discipline, organization, and size. Although most soldiers were conscripts, it was also common to select soldiers based on specific qualifications. The Confucian adviser Xun Zi claimed that foot soldiers from the Wei state were required to wear armor and helmets, shoulder a crossbow with fifty arrows, strap a spear and sword, carry three days' supply of rations, and all the while march 100 li (41.6 km, based on the Eastern Zhou li) in a day. When a man meets this requirement, his household would be exempted from all corvée labor obligations. He would also be given special tax benefits on land and housing. However, this policy made soldiers in the Wei state difficult to replace.

In addition, cavalry was introduced. The first recorded use of cavalry took place in the Battle of Maling, in which general Pang Juan of Wei led his division of 5,000 cavalry into a trap by Qi forces. In 307 BC, King Wuling of Zhao ordered the adoption of nomadic clothing in order to train his own division of cavalry archers.

In the field of military planning, the niceties of chivalrous warfare were abandoned in favor of a general who would ideally be a master of maneuver, illusion, and deception. He had to be ruthless in searching for the advantage, and an organizer in integrating units under him.

=== Qin–Han ===
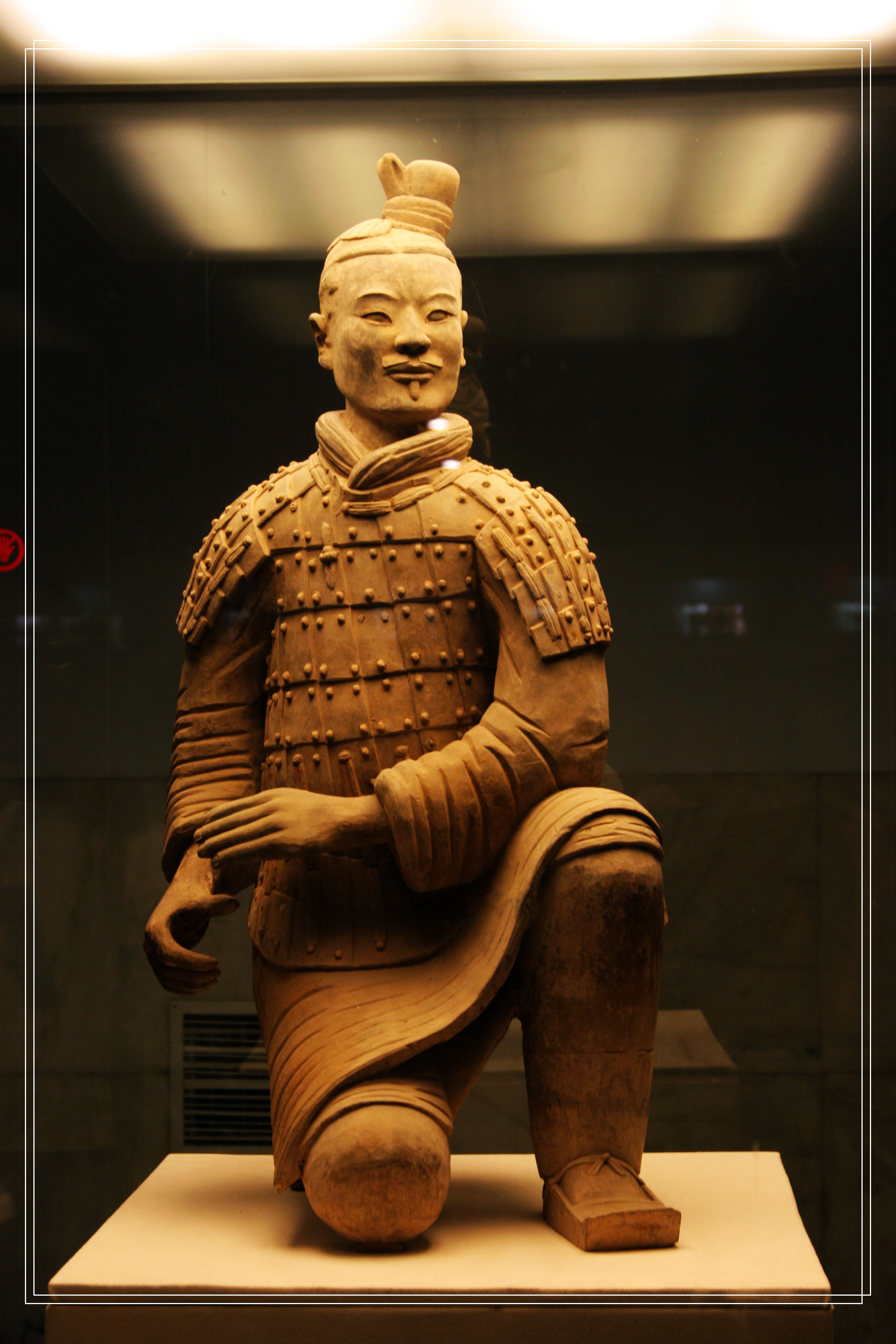
A kneeling crossbowman from the Terracotta Army assembled for the tomb complex of Qin Shi Huang (r. 221–210 BC)

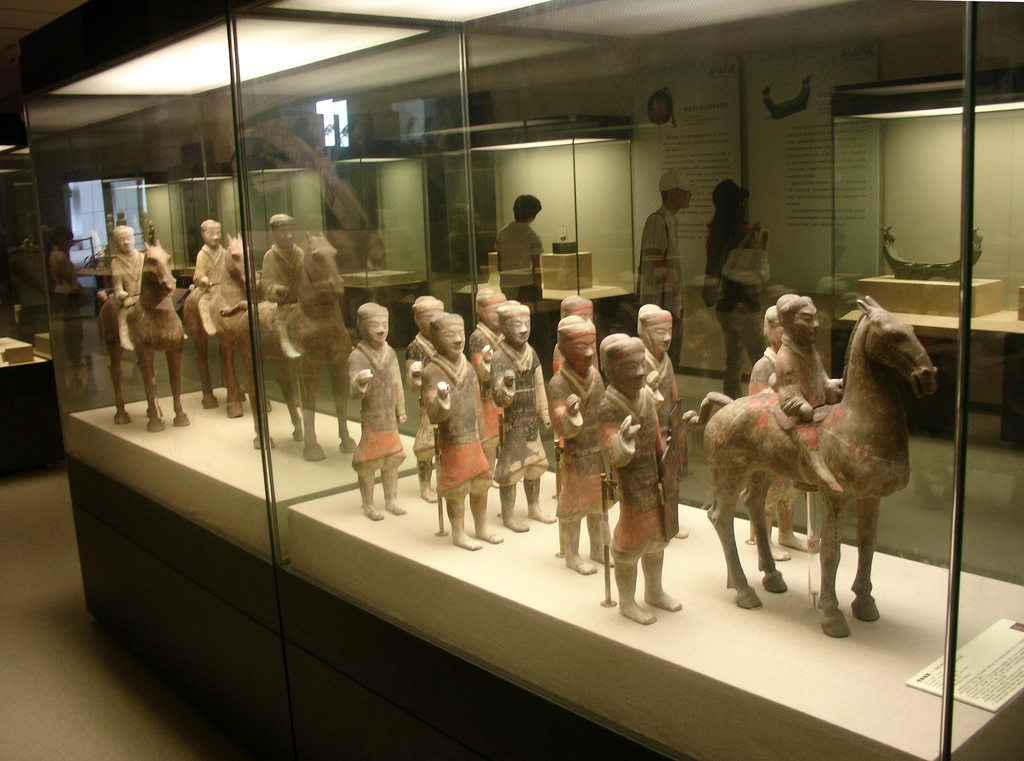
Ceramic statues of infantry and cavalry, from the Han dynasty (202 BC – 220 AD)

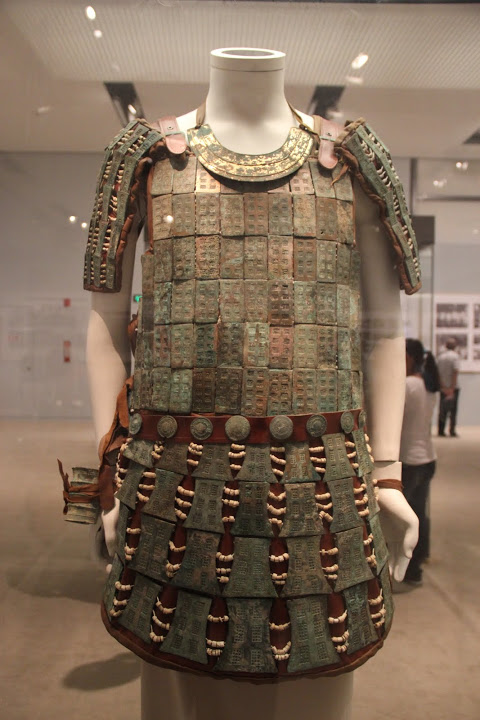
A suit of bronze scale mail armor from the Han dynasty

In 221 BC, the Qin unified China and ushered in the Imperial Era of Chinese history. Although it only lasted 15 years, Qin established institutions that would last for millennia. Qin Shi Huan, titling himself as the "First Emperor", standardized writing systems, weights, coinage, and even the axle lengths of carts. To reduce the chance of rebellion, he made the private possession of weapons illegal. In order to increase the rapid deployment of troops, thousands of miles of roads were built, along with canals that allowed boats to travel long distances. For the rest of Chinese history, a centralized empire was the norm.

During the Qin dynasty and its successor, the Han, the Chinese armies were faced with a new military threat, that of nomadic confederations such as the Xiongnu in the North. These nomads were fast horse archers who had a significant mobility advantage over the settled nations to the South. In order to counter this threat, the Chinese built the Great Wall as a barrier to these nomadic incursions, and also used diplomacy and bribes to preserve peace. Although the Qin general Meng Tian ousted the Xiong-nu from the Ordos region, they regained power under the rule of Maodun. Maodun conquered the Eastern Hu and drove the Yuezhi tribes west. He reclaimed the Ordos from the now crumbling Qin empire and defeated the first Han emperor Gao in battle. This led to a policy of appeasement until the reign of Wudi of Han, who decided to take a tougher stance. However, protecting the borders required a significant investment. Manning the stations of the Great Wall took about ten thousand men. To support them, fifty to sixty thousand soldier-farmers were moved to the frontiers in order to reduce the cost of transporting supplies. These drafted farmers were not good cavalry troops, so a professional army emerged on the frontiers. These consisted of northern Han mercenaries, convicts working for their freedom, and subjected "Southern" Xiong-nu living within Han territory. By 31 AD, the Han dynasty abolished universal military conscription that was passed down from the Warring States. In the South, China's territory was roughly doubled as the Chinese conquered much of what is now Southern China, and extended the frontier from the Yangtze to Vietnam.

Armies during the Qin and Han dynasties largely inherited their institutions from the earlier Warring States period, with the major exception that cavalry forces were becoming more and more important, due to the threat of the Xiongnu. Under Emperor Wu of Han, the Chinese launched a series of massive cavalry expeditions against the Xiongnu, defeating them and conquering much of what is now Northern China, Western China, Mongolia, Central Asia, and Korea. After these victories, Chinese armies were tasked with the goal of holding the new territories against incursions and revolts by peoples such as the Qiang, Xianbei and Xiongnu who had come under Chinese rule.

The structure of the army also changed in this period. While the Qin had utilized a conscript army, by Eastern Han, the army was made up largely of volunteers and conscription could be avoided by paying a fee. Those who presented the government with supplies, horses, or slaves were also exempted from conscription.

=== Three Kingdoms–Jin ===
The end of the Han dynasty saw a massive agrarian uprising that had to be quelled by local governors, who seized the opportunity to form their own armies. The central army disintegrated and was replaced by a series of local warlords, who fought for power until most of the North was unified by Cao Cao, who laid the foundation for the Wei dynasty, which ruled most of China. However, much of Southern China was ruled by two rival Kingdoms, Shu Han and Wu. As a result, this era is known as the Three Kingdoms.

Under the Wei dynasty, the military system changed from the centralized military system of the Han. Unlike the Han, whose forces were concentrated into a central army of volunteer soldiers, Wei's forces depended on the Buqu, a group for whom soldiering was a hereditary profession. These "military households" were given land to farm, but their children could only marry into the families of other "military households". In effect, the military career was inherited; when a soldier or commander died or became unable to fight, a male relative would inherit his position. These hereditary soldiers provided the bulk of the infantry. For the purpose of cavalry, the Wei was similar to the previous Han dynasty in recruiting large numbers of Xiongnu that were settled in southern Shanxi. In addition, provincial armies, which were very weak under the Han, became the bulk of the army under the Wei, for whom the central army was held mainly as a reserve. This military system was also adopted by the Jin dynasty, who succeeded the Wei and unified China.

Advances such as the stirrup helped make cavalry forces more effective.

=== Era of division ===
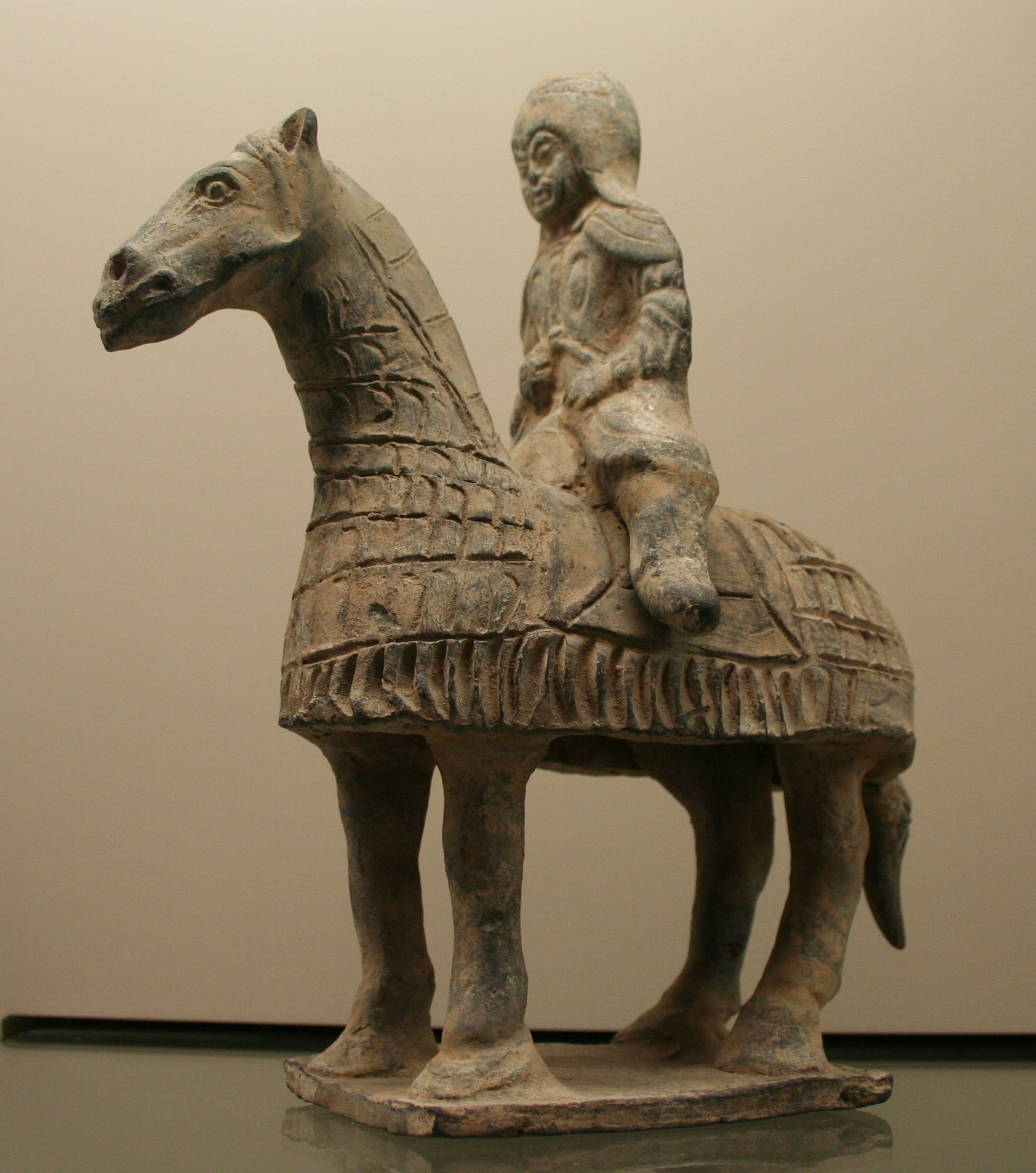
A Chinese terracotta figurine of a cataphract horse and rider, created during the Northern Wei dynasty (386–534 AD)

In 304 AD, a major event shook China. The Jin dynasty, who had unified China 24 years earlier, was tottering in collapse due to a major civil war. Seizing this opportunity, Xiong-nu chieftain Liu Yuan and his forces revolted against their Han Chinese overlords. He was followed by many other barbarian leaders, and these rebels were called the "Wu Hu" or literally "Five barbarian tribes". By 316 AD, the Jin had lost all territory north of the Huai river. From this point on, much of North China was ruled by Sinicized barbarian tribes such as the Xianbei, while southern China remained under Han Chinese rule, a period known as the Era of Division. During this era, the military forces of both Northern and southern regimes diverged and developed very differently.

==== Northern ====
Northern China was devastated by the Wu Hu uprisings. After the initial uprising, the various tribes fought among themselves in a chaotic era known as the Sixteen Kingdoms. Although brief unifications of the North, such as Later Zhao and Former Qin, occurred, these were relatively short-lived. During this era, the Northern armies, were mainly based around nomadic cavalry, but also employed Chinese as foot soldiers and siege personnel. This military system was rather improvising and ineffective, and the states established by the Wu Hu were mostly destroyed by the Jin dynasty or the Xianbei.

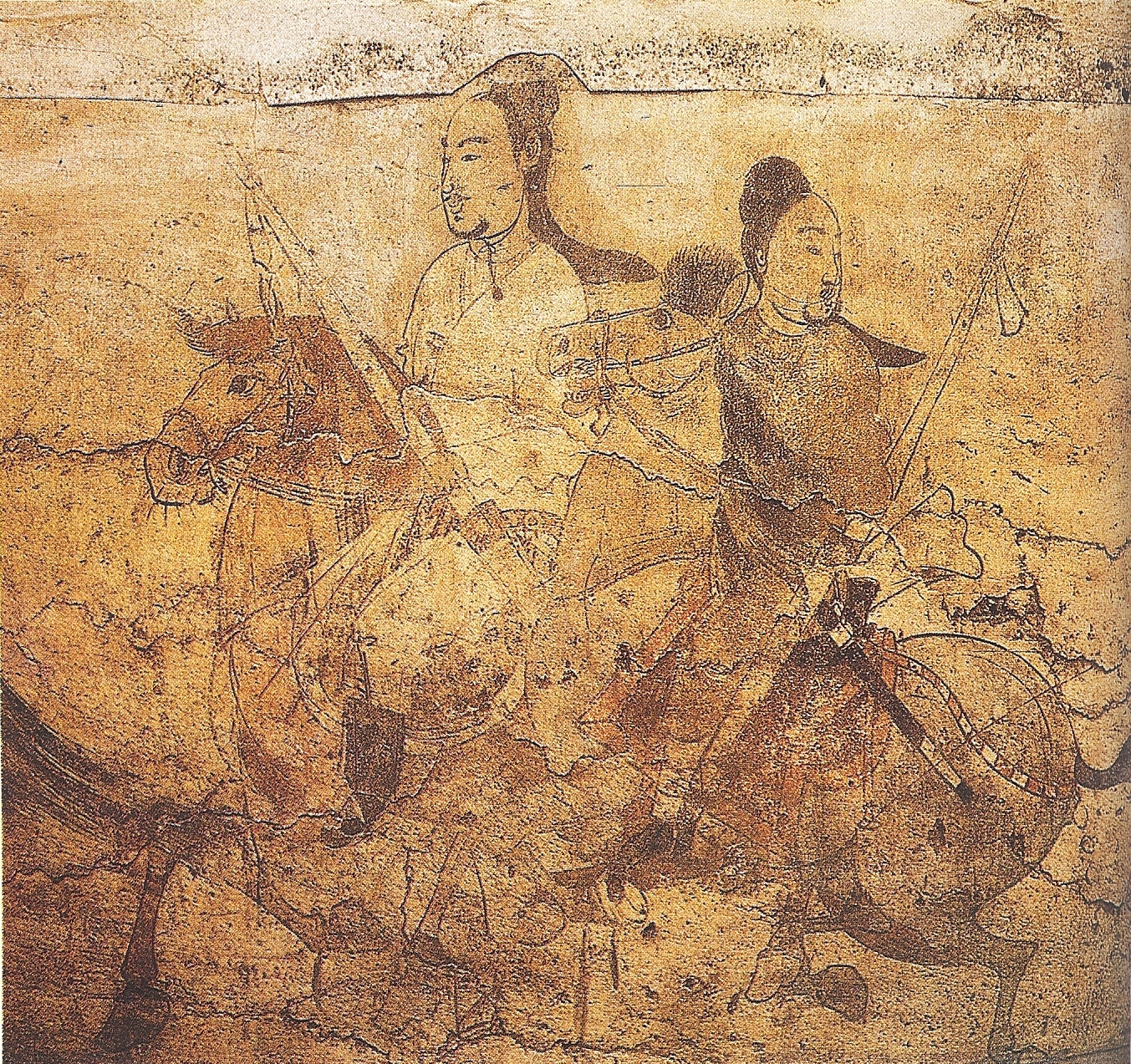
Armed riders on horseback, a tomb mural from the Northern Qi (550–557 AD) period

A new military system did not come until the invasions of the Xianbei in the 5th century, by which time most of the Wu Hu had been destroyed and much of North China had been reconquered by the Chinese dynasties in the South. Nevertheless, the Xianbei won many successes against the Chinese, conquering all of North China by 468 AD The Xianbei state of Northern Wei created the earliest forms of the equal field (均田) land system and the Fubing system (府兵) military system, both of which became major institutions under Sui and Tang. Under the fubing system each headquarters (府) commanded about one thousand farmer-soldiers who could be mobilized for war. In peacetime they were self-sustaining on their land allotments, and were obliged to do tours of active duty in the capital.

==== Southern ====
Southern Chinese dynasties, being descended from the Han and Jin, prided themselves on being the successors of the Chinese civilization and disdained the Northern dynasties, who they viewed as barbarian usurpers. Southern armies continued the military system of Buqu or hereditary soldiers from the Jin dynasty. However, the growing power of aristocratic landowners, who also provided many of the buqu, meant that the Southern dynasties were very unstable; after the fall of the Jin, four dynasties ruled in just two centuries.

This is not to say that the Southern armies did not work well. Southern armies won great victories in the late 4th century, such as the battle of Fei at which an 80,000-man Jin army crushed the 300,000-man army of Former Qin, an empire founded by one of the Wu Hu tribes that had briefly unified North China. In addition, under the brilliant general Liu Yu, Chinese armies briefly reconquered much of North China.

=== Sui–Tang ===
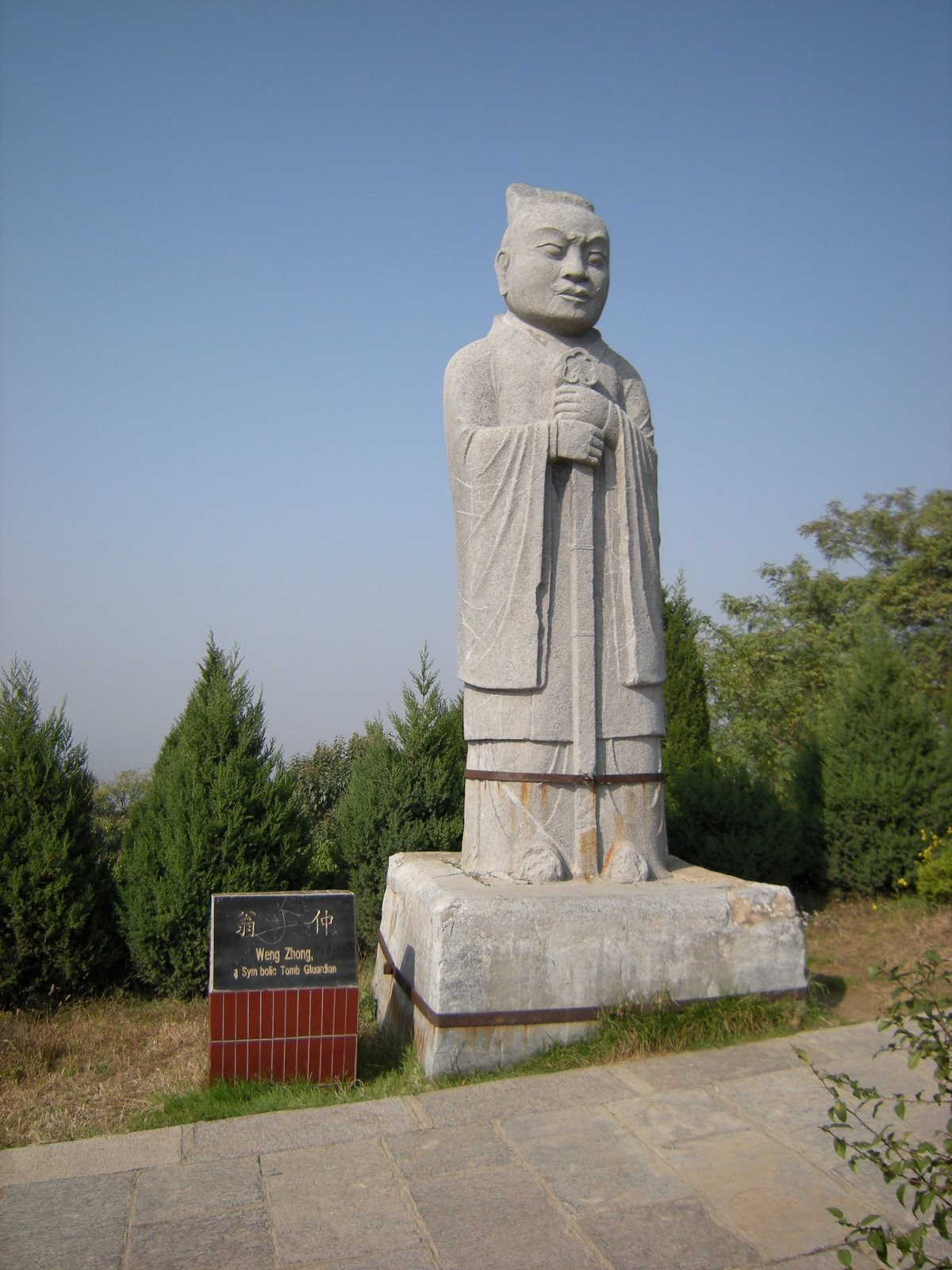
A stone tomb guardian holding a sword, from the Tang dynasty tombs at the Qianling Mausoleum

In 581 AD, the Chinese Yang Jian forced the Xianbei ruler to abdicate, founding the Sui dynasty and restoring Chinese rule in the North. By 589 AD, he had unified much of China.

The Sui's unification of China sparked a new golden age. During the Sui and Tang, Chinese armies, based on the Fubing system invented during the era of division, won military successes that restored the empire of the Han dynasty and reasserted Chinese power. The Tang created large contingents of powerful heavy cavalry. A key component of the success of Sui and Tang armies, just like the earlier Qin and Han armies, was the adoption of large elements of cavalry. These powerful horsemen, combined with the superior firepower of the Chinese infantry (powerful missile weapons such as recurve crossbows), made Chinese armies powerful.

However, during the Tang dynasty the fubing (府兵) system began to break down. Based on state ownership of the land under the juntian system, the prosperity of the Tang dynasty meant that the state's lands were being bought up in ever increasing quantities. Consequently, the state could no longer provide land to the farmers, and the juntian system broke down. By the 8th century, the Tang had reverted to the centralized military system of the Han. However, this also did not last, and it broke down during the disorder of the An Lushan, which saw many fanzhen or local generals become extraordinarily powerful. These fanzhen were so powerful they collected taxes, raised armies, and made their positions hereditary. Because of this, the central army of the Tang was greatly weakened. Eventually, the Tang dynasty collapsed and the various fanzhen were made into separate kingdoms, a situation that would last until the Song dynasty.

During the Tang, professional military writing and schools began to be set up to train officers, an institution that would be expanded during the Song.

Tibetan tradition says that the Tang dynasty seized the Tibetan capital at Lhasa in 650. In 763 the Tibetans captured the Tang capital at Chang'an, for fifteen days during the An Shi Rebellion.

In 756, over 4,000 Arab mercenaries joined the Chinese against An Lushan. They remained in China, and some of them were ancestors of the Hui people. During the Tang dynasty, 3,000 Chinese soldiers, and 3,000 Muslim soldiers were traded to each other in an agreement.

=== Liao, Song and Jurchen Jin ===
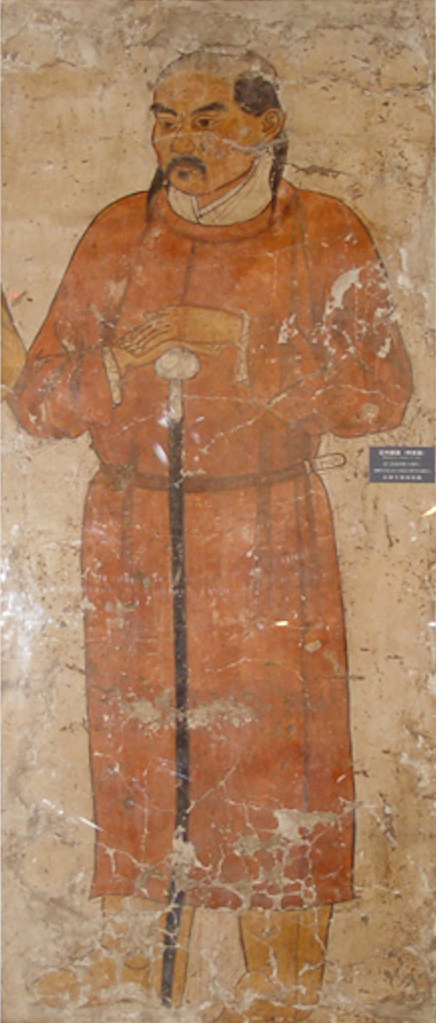
Guard of Liao dynasty

During the Song dynasty, the emperors were focused on curbing the power of the Fanzhen, local generals who they viewed as responsible for the collapse of the Tang dynasty. Local power was curbed and most power was centralized in the government, along with the army. In addition, the Song adopted a system in which commands by generals were ad hoc and temporary; this was to prevent the troops from becoming attached to their generals, who could potentially rebel. Successful generals such as Yue Fei and Liu Zen were persecuted by the Song Court who feared they would rebel.

Although the system worked when it came to quelling rebellions, it was a failure in defending China and asserting its power. The Song had to rely on new gunpowder weapons introduced during the late Tang and bribes to fend off attacks by its enemies, such as the Liao (Khitans), West Xia (Tanguts), Jin (Jurchens), and Mongol Empire, as well as an expanded army of over 1 million men. The Song was greatly disadvantaged by the fact their neighbors had taken advantage of the era of chaos following the collapse of the Tang to advance into Northern China unimpeded. The Song also lost the horse-producing regions which made their cavalry extremely inferior.

The military technology of the Song included gunpowder weapons such as fire lances, cast-iron gunpowder bombs, and rockets were employed in large numbers. The Song government also created China's first standing navy. This military technology and prosperous economy were key for the Song army to fend off invaders who could not be bribed with "tribute payments," such as the Khitans and Jur'chens. Song forces held off Central Asian Mongol armies longer than did other settled peoples, until the fall of the Song in 1279.

=== Yuan ===
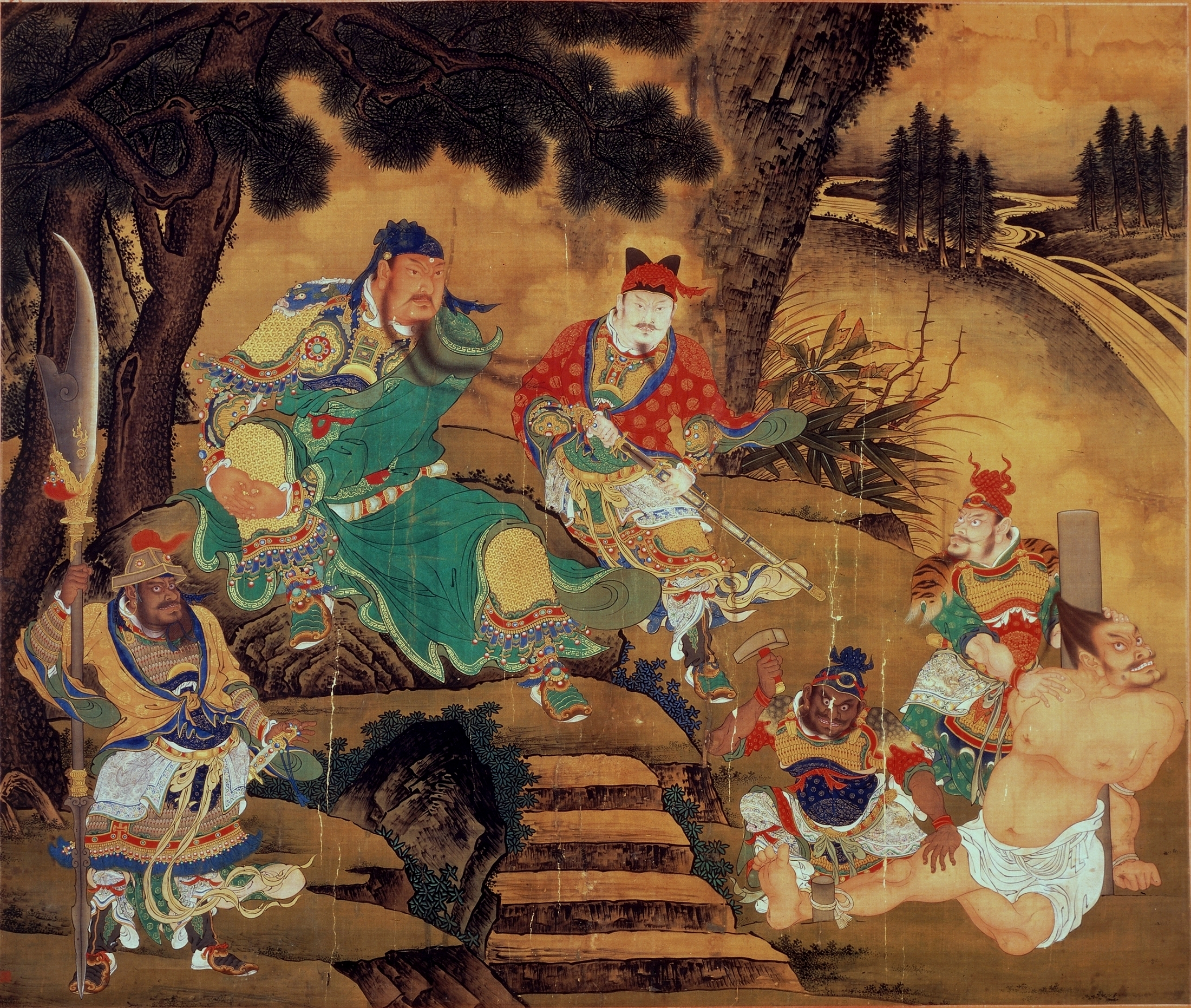
"Guan Yu Captures General Pang De", a Ming dynasty painting by Shang Xi

Founded by the Mongols who conquered Song China, the Yuan had the same military system as most nomadic peoples to China's north, focused mainly on nomadic cavalry, who were organized based on households and who were led by leaders appointed by the khan.

The Mongol invasion started in earnest only when they acquired their first navy, mainly from Chinese Song defectors. Liu Cheng, a Chinese Song commander who defected to the Mongols, suggested a switch in tactics, and assisted the Mongols in building their own fleet. Many Chinese served in the Mongol navy and army and assisted them in their conquest of Song.

However, in the conquest of China, the Mongols also adopted gunpowder weapons such as the thundercrash bomb and thousands of Chinese infantry and naval forces into the Mongol army. Another weapon adopted by the Mongols were Saracen counterweight trebuchets designed by Muslim engineers; these proved decisive in the Siege of Xiangyang, whose capture by the Mongols precipitated the beginning of the end for the Song dynasty. The Mongol military system began to collapse after the 14th century and by 1368 the Mongols was driven out by the Chinese Ming dynasty.

The Mongols under Genghis Khan and Hulagu also brought Chinese artillery specialists within their armies who specialized in mangonels, to Persia.

During the Mongol invasion of Iraq, 1,000 Chinese crossbowmen who utilized fire arrows participated in the invasion, along with the Mongol tribesmen. In 1258 the commander of the Mongol Hulagu Khan's forces besieging Baghdad was a Chinese General Guo Kan. The Chinese General Guo Kan was then made Governor of Baghdad by Hulagu, who also brought Chinese technicians specializing in hydraulics to engineer the Tigris–Euphrates basin irrigation systems. This resulted in the Middle East being permeated by major Chinese influence during Hulagu's reign.

Many Han Chinese and Khitan defected to the Mongols to fight against the Jin. Two Han Chinese leaders, Shi Tianze, Liu Heima (劉黑馬, Liu Ni), and the Khitan Xiao Zhala (蕭札剌) defected and commanded the 3 Tumens in the Mongol army. Liu Heima and Shi Tianze served Ogödei Khan. Liu Heima and Shi Tianxiang led armies against Western Xia for the Mongols. There were 4 Han Tumens and 3 Khitan Tumens, with each Tumen consisting of 10,000 troops. The three Khitan Generals Shimobeidier (石抹孛迭兒), Tabuyir (塔不已兒) and Xiaozhacizhizizhongxi (蕭札刺之子重喜) commanded the three Khitan Tumens and the four Han Generals Zhang Rou, Yan Shi, Shi Tianze, and Liu Heima commanded the four Han tumens under Ogödei Khan. The Mongols received defections from Han Chinese and Khitans while the Jin were abandoned by their own Jurchen officers.

Shi Tianze was a Han Chinese who lived in the Jin dynasty (1115–1234). Interethnic marriage between Han and Jurchen became common at this time. His father was Shi Bingzhi (史秉直, Shih Ping-chih). Shi Bingzhi was married to a Jurchen woman (surname Na-ho) and a Han Chinese woman (surname Chang), it is unknown which of them was Shi Tianze's mother. Shi Tianze was married to two Jurchen women, a Han Chinese woman, and a Korean woman, and his son Shi Gang was born to one of his Jurchen wives. His Jurchen wives' surnames were Mo-nien and Na-ho, his Korean wife's surname was Li, and his Han Chinese wife's surname was Shi. Shi Tianze defected to the Mongol Empire's forces upon their invasion of the Jin dynasty. His son Shi Gang married a Kerait woman, the Kerait were Mongolified Turkic people and considered as part of the "Mongol nation". Shi Tianze (Shih T'ien-tse), Zhang Rou (Chang Jou, 張柔), and Yan Shi (Yen Shih, 嚴實) and other high ranking Chinese who served in the Jin dynasty and defected to the Mongols helped build the structure for the administration of the new state. Chagaan (Tsagaan) and Zhang Rou jointly launched an attack on the Song dynasty ordered by Töregene Khatun.

=== Ming ===
The early Ming Emperors from Hongwu to Zhengde continued Yuan practices such as hereditary military institutions, demanding Korean concubines and eunuchs, having Muslim eunuchs, wearing Mongol style clothing and Mongol hats, engaging in archery and horseback riding, having Mongols serve in the Ming military, patronizing Tibetan Buddhism, with the early Ming Emperors seeking to project themselves as "universal rulers" to various peoples such as Central Asian Muslims, Tibetans, and Mongols, modeled after the Mongol Khagan, however, this history of Ming universalism has been obscured and denied by historians who covered it up and presented the Ming as xenophobes seeking to expunge Mongol influence and presenting while they presented the Qing and Yuan as "universal" rulers in contrast to the Ming.

A cavalry-based army modeled on the Yuan military was implemented by the Hongwu and Yongle Emperors. Hongwu's army and officialdom incorporated Mongols. Mongols were retained by the Ming within its territory. in Guangxi Mongol archers participated in a war against Miao minorities.

Math, calligraphy, literature, equestrianism, archery, music, and rites were the Six Arts.

At the Guozijian, law, math, calligraphy, equestrianism, and archery were emphasized by the Ming Hongwu Emperor in addition to Confucian classics and also required in the imperial examinations. Archery and equestrianism were added to the exam by Hongwu in 1370 like how archery and equestrianism were required for non-military officials at the 武舉 College of War in 1162 by the Song Emperor Xiaozong. The area around the Meridian Gate of Nanjing was used for archery by guards and generals under Hongwu.

The Imperial exam included archery. Archery on horseback was practiced by Chinese living near the frontier. Wang Ju's writings on archery were followed during the Ming and Yuan and the Ming developed new methods of archery. Jinling Tuyong showed archery in Nanjing during the Ming. Contests in archery were held in the capital for Garrison of Guard soldiers who were handpicked.

The Ming focused on building up a powerful standing army that could drive off attacks by foreign barbarians. Beginning in the 14th century, the Ming armies drove out the Mongols and expanded China's territories to include Yunnan, Mongolia, Tibet, much of Xinjiang and Vietnam. The Ming also engaged in Overseas expeditions which included one violent conflict in Sri Lanka. Ming armies incorporated gunpowder weapons into their military force, speeding up a development that had been prevalent since the Song.

Ming military institutions were largely responsible for the success of Ming's armies. The early Ming's military was organized by the Wei-suo system, which split the army up into numerous "Wei" or commands throughout the Ming frontiers. Each wei was to be self-sufficient in agriculture, with the troops stationed there farming as well as training. This system also forced soldiers to serve hereditarily in the army; although effective in initially taking control of the empire, this military system proved unviable in the long run and collapsed in the 1430s, with Ming reverted to a professional volunteer army similar to Tang, Song and Later Han.

Throughout most of the Ming's history, the Ming armies were successful in defeating foreign powers such as the Mongols and Japanese and expanding China's influence. However, with the little Ice Age in the 17th century, the Ming dynasty was faced with a disastrous famine and its military forces disintegrated as a result of the famines spurring from this event.

The Chinese defeated the Portuguese at the First Battle of Tamao (1521) and at the Second Battle of Tamao (1522) Chinese ships knocked out two Portuguese ships, who were armed with gunpowder weapons, and forced the Portuguese to retreat.

The Ming dynasty defeated the Dutch in the Sino–Dutch conflicts in 1622–1624 over the Penghu islands and at the Battle of Liaoluo Bay in 1633. In 1662, Chinese and European arms clashed when a Ming-loyalist army of 25,000 led by Koxinga forced Dutch East India Company garrison of 2,000 on Taiwan into surrender, after a final assault during a seven-month siege. According to Frederick Coyett's account written after the siege to absolve himself of the Dutch defeat, the alleged final blow to the company's defense came when a Dutch defector, who would warn Koxinga of a life-threatening bombardment, had pointed the inactive besieging army to the weak points of the Dutch star-shaped fort. This claim of a Dutch defector only appears in Coyett's account and Chinese records make no such mention of any defector. While the mainstay of the Chinese forces were archers, the Chinese used cannons too during the siege, which however the European eyewitnesses did not judge as effective as the Dutch batteries. The Dutch lost five ships and 130 men in an attempt to relieve the siege of the fortress.

=== Qing ===
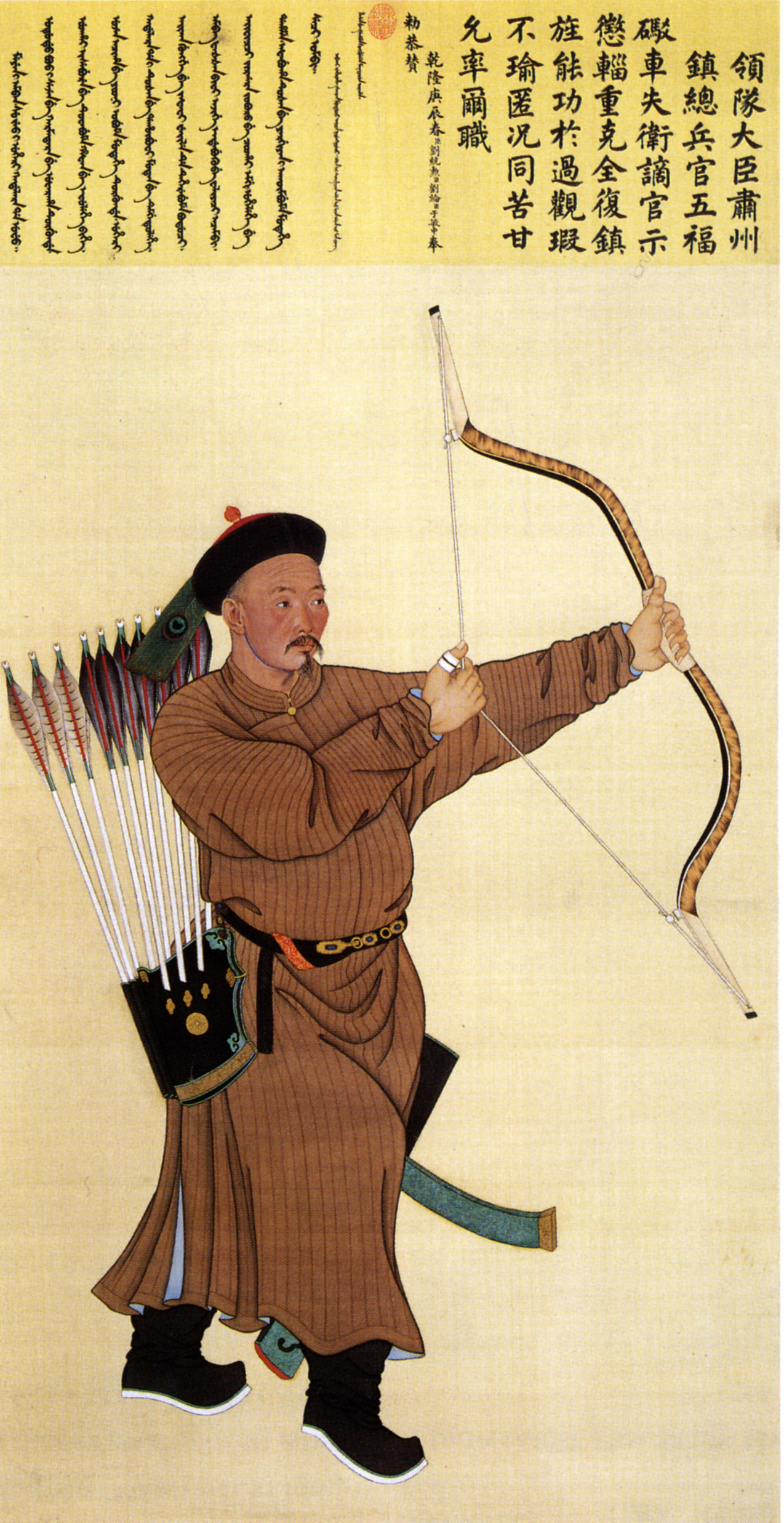
Portrait of Wu Fu, Brigadier General of the Gansu Region. Hanging scroll; ink and color on silk; 1760 AD; inscribed, and with one seal of the Qianlong Emperor.

The Qing dynasty, founded by the Manchus, was, like the Yuan a conquest dynasty. The Manchus were a sedentary agricultural people who lived in fixed villages, farmed crops, practiced hunting and mounted archery., In the late sixteenth century, Nurhaci, founder of the Later Jin dynasty (1616–1636) and originally a Ming vassal, began organizing "Banners", military-social units that included Jurchen, Han Chinese, Korean and Mongol elements under direct command of the Emperor.

The main Manchu tactics were using infantry with bows and arrows, swords, and pikes while cavalry was kept in the rear. Unlike the Song and Ming, however, the Qing armies neglected firearms, and did not develop them in any significant way. The Qing armies also contained a much higher proportion of cavalry than earlier Chinese dynasties.

Hong Taiji, the son of Nurhaci, recognized that Han Chinese were needed in the conquest of the Ming, as he explained why he treated the Ming defector General Hong Chengchou leniently. Ming artillery was responsible for many victories. The Ming would not be easily defeated unless musket and cannon wielding Han Chinese troops were added to the existing banners. Han Chinese Generals who defected to the Manchu were often given women from the Imperial Aisin Gioro family in marriage while the ordinary soldiers who defected were often given non-royal Manchu women as wives. Nurhaci married one of his granddaughters to the Ming General Li Yongfang after he surrendered the city of Fushun in Liaoning in 1618 and a mass marriage of Han Chinese officers and officials to Manchu women numbering 1,000 couples was arranged by Prince Yoto and Hongtaiji in 1632 to promote harmony between the two ethnic groups.

The Qing differentiated between Han Bannermen and ordinary Han civilians. Han Chinese who defected up to 1644 and joined the Eight Banners were made bannermen, giving them social and legal privileges in addition to being acculturated to Manchu culture. Han defected to the Qing and swelled the ranks of the Eight Banners so much that ethnic Manchus became a minority, constituting only 16% in 1648, Han Bannermen 75%, and Mongol Bannermen making up the rest.

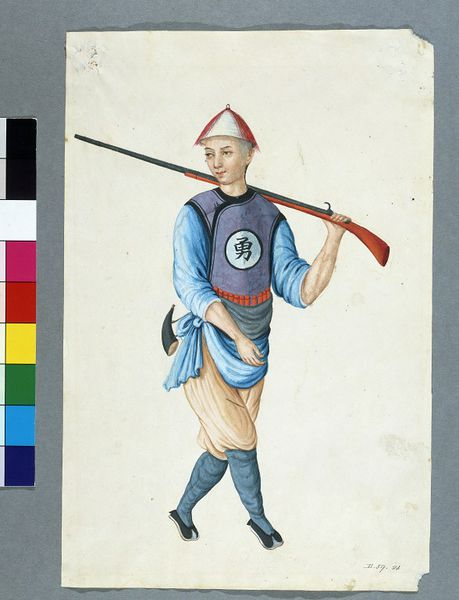
A Foot soldier

In 1644, the invading army was multi-ethnic, with Han, Mongols, and Manchu banners. The political divide was between Han Chinese non bannermen and the "conquest elite", made up of Han Chinese bannermen, nobles, Mongols and Manchu; ethnicity was not the factor. Among the Banners, gunpowder weapons like muskets and artillery were specifically wielded by the Chinese Banners. Bannermen made up the majority of governors in the early Qing and were the ones who governed and administered China after the conquest, stabilizing Qing rule. Han Bannermen dominated the post of governor-general in the time of the Shunzhi and Kangxi Emperors, and also the post of governors, largely excluding ordinary Han civilians from the posts.

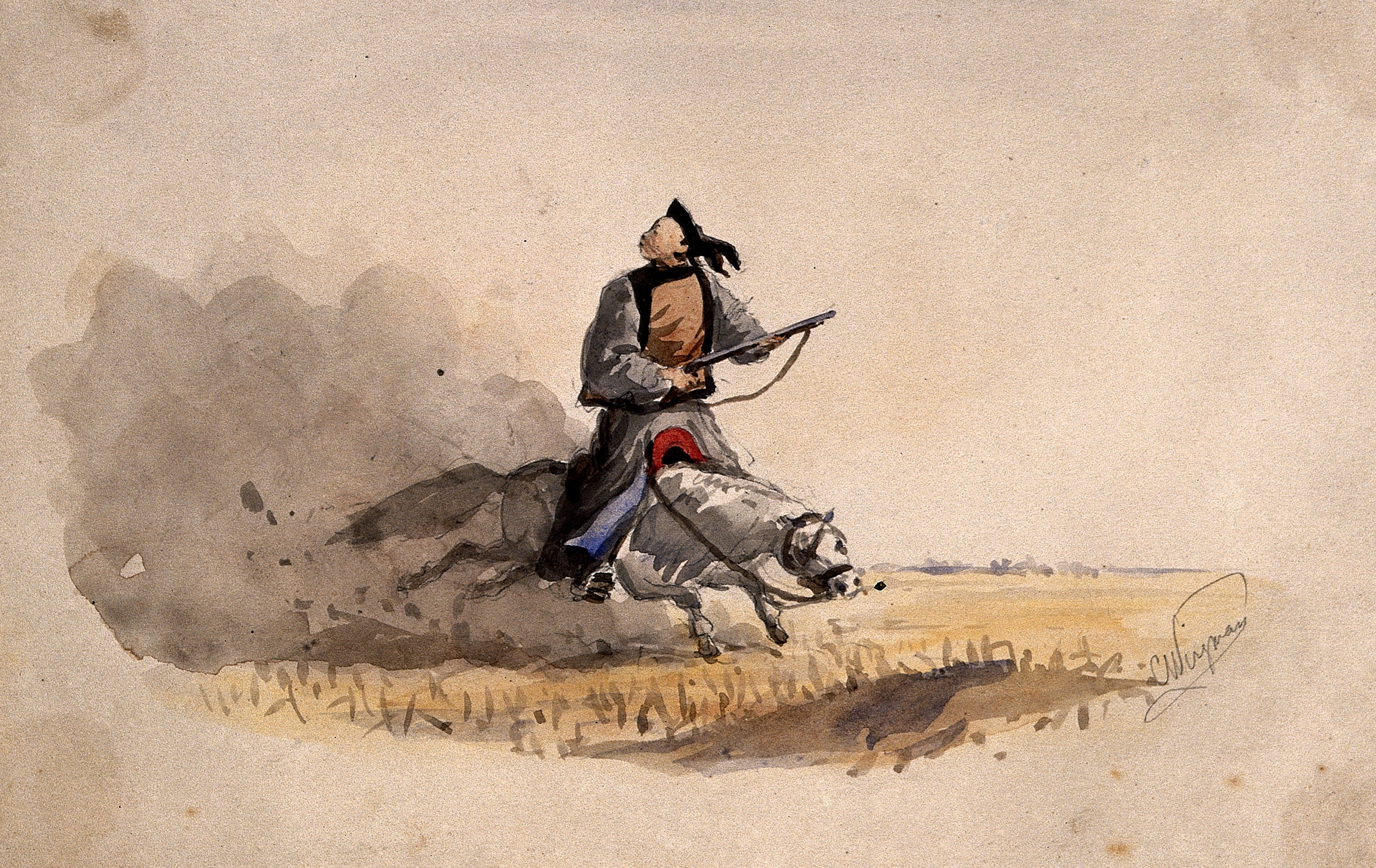
A Green Standard Army cavalryman

The Qing relied on the Green Standard soldiers, made up of Han Chinese who had defected, to help rule northern China. Green Standard Han Chinese troops governed locally while Han Chinese Bannermen, Mongol Bannermen, and Manchu Bannermen were brought only into emergency situations where there was sustained military resistance.

Since it was not possible for only Manchus to conquer southern China, Ming Han Chinese armies conquered the territory for them. Three Liaodong Han Bannermen officers who played a great role in the conquest of southern China were Shang Kexi, Geng Zhongming, and Kong Youde, who then governed southern China autonomously as viceroys for the Qing. Wu, Geng, and Shang's son, Shang Zhixin, in the early 1660s began to feel threatened by the increasing control from the north, and decided they had no choice but to revolt. The ensuing Revolt of the Three Feudatories lasted for eight years. At the peak of the rebels' fortunes, they extended their control as far north as the Yangtze River, nearly establishing a divided China. Wu then hesitated to go further north, not being able to coordinate strategy with his allies, and the Kangxi Emperor was able to unify his forces for a counterattack led by a new generation of Manchu generals. By 1681, the Qing government had established control over a ravaged southern China from which it took several decades to recover.

Manchu Generals and Bannermen were initially put to shame by the better performance of the Han Chinese Green Standard Army, who fought better than them against the rebels and this was noted by the Kangxi Emperor, leading him to task Generals Sun Sike, Wang Jinbao, and Zhao Liangdong to lead Green Standard Soldiers to crush the rebels. The Qing thought that Han Chinese were superior at battling other Han people and so used the Green Standard Army as the dominant and majority army in crushing the rebels instead of Bannermen.

In 1652–1689, during the Sino-Russian border conflicts, the Qing dynasty engaged and pushed back about 2,000 Russian Cossacks in a series of intermittent skirmishes. The frontier in the south-west was extended slowly, in 1701 the Qing defeated Tibetans at the Battle of Dartsedo. The Dzungar Khanate conquered the Uyghurs in the Dzungar conquest of Altishahr and seized control of Tibet. Han Chinese Green Standard Army soldiers and Manchu bannermen were commanded by the Han Chinese General Yue Zhongqi in the Chinese expedition to Tibet (1720) which expelled the Dzungars from Tibet and placed it under Qing rule. At multiple places such as Lhasa, Batang, Dartsendo, Lhari, Chamdo, and Litang, Green Standard troops were garrisoned throughout the Dzungar war.

During the reign of the Qianlong Emperor in the mid-late 18th century, they launched the Ten Great Campaigns resulting in victories over the Dzungar Khanate and the Kingdom of Nepal; the Manchus drove the Gurkhas out of Tibet and only stopped their chase near Kathmandu. After the demise of the Dzunghar Khanate, the Manchu authority in Tibet faced only weak opposition. In 1841, the Sino-Sikh war ended with the expulsion of the Sikh army.

A British officer said of Qing forces during the First Opium War, "The Chinese are robust muscular fellows, and no cowards; the Tartars desperate; but neither are well commanded nor acquainted with European warfare. Having had, however, experience of three of them, I am inclined to supposed that a Tartar bullet is not a whit softer than a French one." Manchus are called "Tartars" in the text.

Southern Chinese coolies served with the French and British forces against the Qing: "The Chinese coolies entertained in 1857 from the inhabitants of South China, renegades though they were, served the British faithfully and cheerfully before Canton, and throughout the operations in North China in 1860 they likewise proved invaluable. Their coolness under fire was admirable. At the assault of the Peiho Forts in 1860 they carried the French ladders to the ditch, and, standing in the water up to their necks, supported them with their hands to enable the storming party to cross. It was not usual to take them into action; they, however, bore the dangers of a distant fire with the greatest composure, evincing a strong desire to close with their compatriots, and engage them in mortal combat with their bamboos.—(Fisher.)"

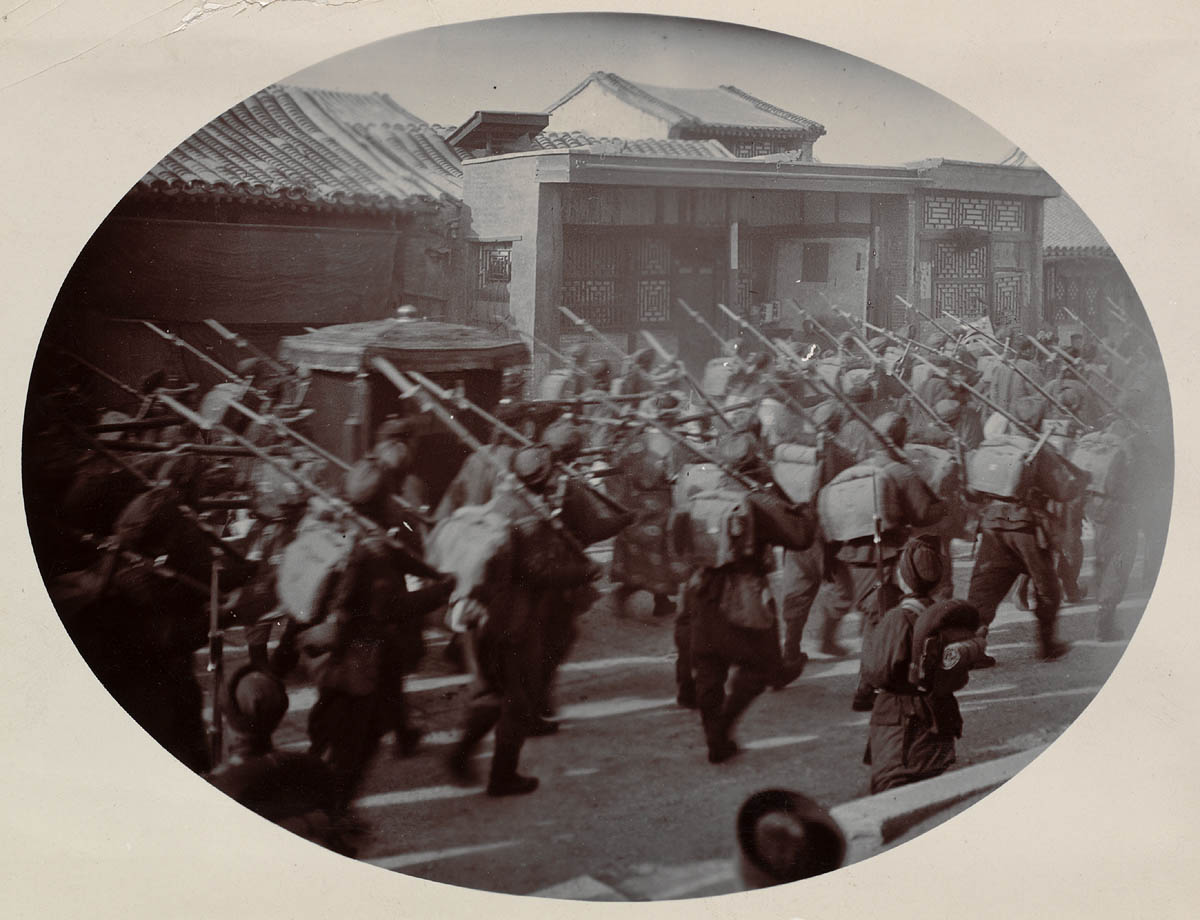
Troops of the Wuwei Corps led by Yuan Shikai escorting Empress Dowager Cixi back to the Forbidden City in 1902

During the Taiping Rebellion (1850–1864), the rebel forces led by able generals such as Shi Dakai were well organized and tactically innovative. After the rebel armies defeated Manchu generals in a series of battles, the Qing government allowed armies made up of foreigners, such as the Ever Victorious Army, and eventually responded by forming armies mainly composed of Han Chinese, and under Han Chinese commanders such as Zeng Guofan, Zuo Zongtang, Li Hongzhang and Yuan Shikai. Examples of these armies were the Xiang Army and the Huai Army. The Qing also absorbed bandit armies and Generals who defected to the Qing side during rebellions, such as the Muslim Generals Ma Zhan'ao, Ma Qianling, Ma Haiyan, and Ma Julung. There were also armies composed of Chinese Muslims led by Muslim Generals like Dong Fuxiang, Ma Anliang, Ma Fuxiang, and Ma Fuxing who commanded the Kansu Braves. Local officials could also take command of military affairs, such as the father of Yang Zengxin during the Panthay Rebellion.

The "First Chinese Regiment" (Weihaiwei Regiment) which was praised for its performance, consisted of Chinese collaborators serving in the British military.

== Modernization ==
The Beiyang Army was the army of northern China.

In 1885 Li Hongzhang founded the Tianjin Military Academy (天津武備學堂) for Chinese army officers, with German advisers, as part of his military reforms. The move was supported by Anhui Army commander Zhou Shengchuan. The academy was to serve Anhui Army and Green Standard Army officers. Various practical military, mathematics and science subjects were taught at the academy. The instructors were German officers. Another program was started at the academy for five years in 1887 to train teenagers as new army officers. Mathematics, practical and technical subjects, sciences, foreign languages, Chinese Classics and history were taught at the school. Exams were administered to students. The instruction for Tianjin Military Academy was copied at the Weihaiwei and Shanhaiguan military schools. The 'maritime defense fund' supplied the budget for the Tianjin Military Academy, which was shared with the Tianjin Naval Academy.

The Tianjin Military Academy in 1886 adopted as part of its curriculum the Romance of the Three Kingdoms. Among its alumni were Wang Yingkai and Duan Qirui (段祺瑞). Among its staff was Yinchang.

The Qing founded Baoding Military Academy.

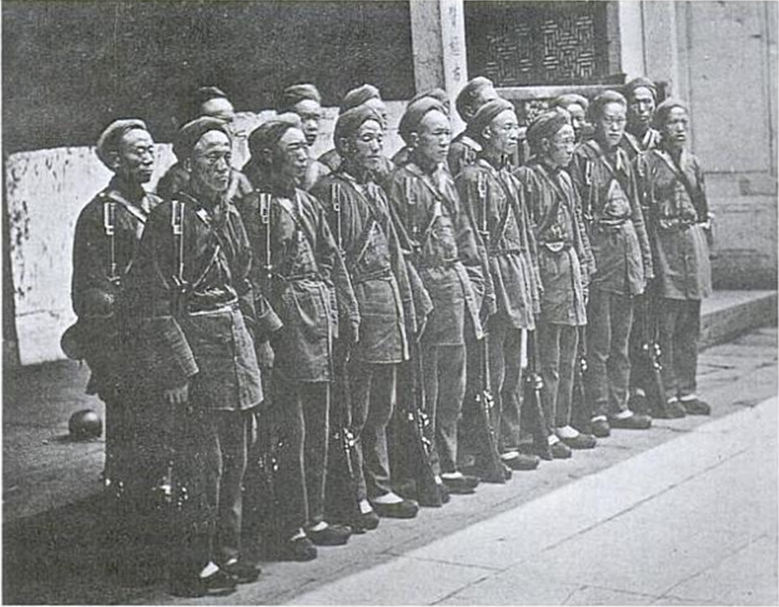
Chinese Troops trained by foreigners 1867–68

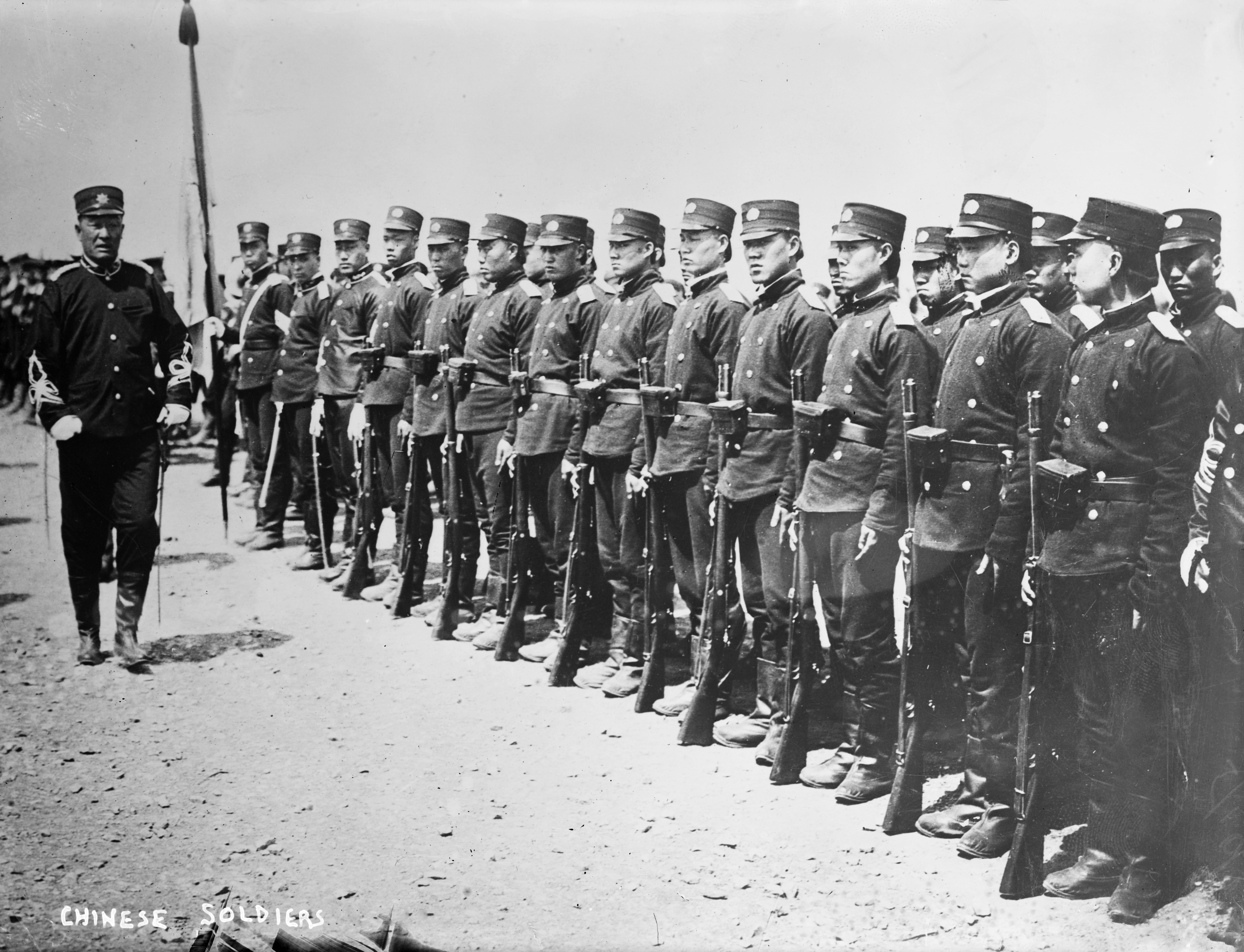
The Qing New Army in 1905

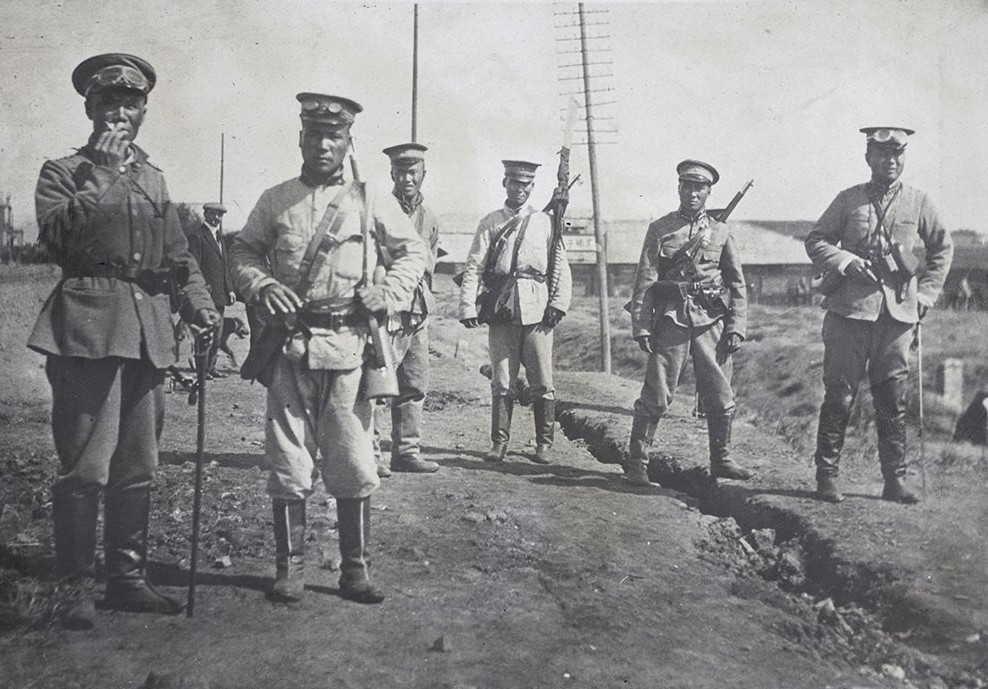
New Army soldiers in 1911.

The earliest modernised units of the Qing military were part of the New Army.

China began to extensively modernize its military in the late 19th century. It purchased the most modern Krupp artillery and Mauser repeater magazine rifles from Germany, in addition to mines and torpedoes. It used these with sniper, pincer, and ambush tactics, and China also began to reorganize its military, adding engineer companies and artillery brigades. Mining, engineering, flooding, and simultaneous multiple attacks were employed by Chinese troops along with modern artillery. By 1882, the Qing navy had some fifty steam warships, half of them built in China. The American Commodore Robert Shufeldt, reported that the British-built Chinese ships he inspected had "every modern appliance," including "guns with large calibre and high velocity, moved by hydraulic power, machine guns, electric lights, torpedoes and torpedo boats, engines with twin screws, steel rams, etc. etc." Yet, Shufeldt concludes, in order to be really effective, it needs an intelligent personnel and a thorough organization." Li Hongzhang evidently agreed, and sent Chinese students and officers to the United States and Germany for training. The Tientsin Arsenal developed the capacity to manufacture "electric torpedoes," that is, what would now be called "mines," US consul general, David Bailey reported that they were deployed in waterways along with other modern military weapons.

The Chinese armies which received the modern equipment and training were the Han Chinese Xiang Army, the Muslim Kansu Braves, and three Manchu Banner Divisions. The three Manchu divisions were destroyed in the Boxer Rebellion. The Xiang Army employed the new weaponry to achieve victory in the Dungan revolt, with German Dreyse Needle Guns and Krupp artillery. The Lanzhou arsenal in China in 1875 was able to produce modern European munitions and artillery by itself, with no foreign help. A Russian even saw the arsenal make "steel rifle-barrelled breechloaders".

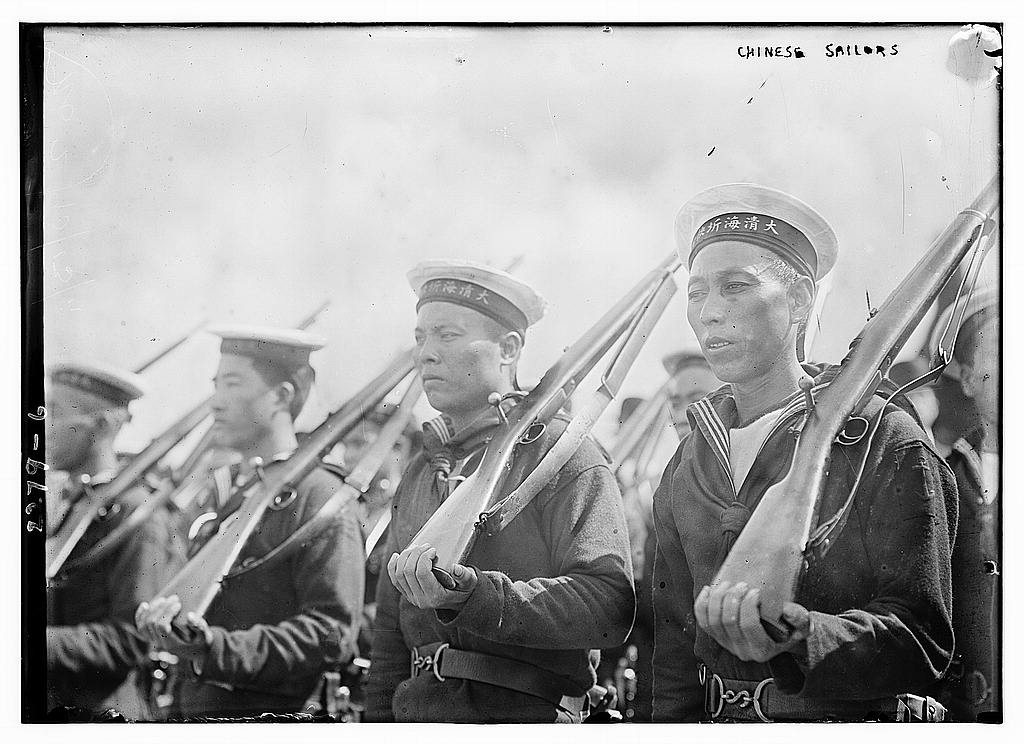
Sailors from the Hai Chi of the Imperial Chinese Navy, on parade in New York.

Chinese military officials were interested in western guns, and eagerly purchased them. Modern arsenals were established at places like Hanyang Arsenal, which produced German Mauser rifles and mountain guns. The Nanjing arsenal was making Hotchkiss, Maxim, and Nordenfeld guns in 1892. A Frenchman reported that China had the ability to reverse engineer any western weapon they needed. A British also noted that Chinese were efficient at reverse engineering foreign weapons and building their own versions. In the first Opium War the Chinese copied the British weapons and upgraded their military hardware while the fighting was going on. Tianjin arsenal made Dahlgren guns, 10,000 Remington rifles monthly, as of 1872. Li Hongzhang in 1890 added equipment, allowing it to make Maxim Machine guns, Nordenfelt cannons, Krupp guns, and ammunition for all of these. China was extremely familiar with R&D on German military hardware. Gatling guns and other artillery were purchased by the Chinese military from western countries. Montigny mitrailleuse guns were also imported from France.

In addition to modern equipment, Chinese weapons, like fire arrows, light mortars, dadao swords, matchlocks, bows and arrows, crossbows, and halberds continued to be used alongside the western weaponry. Chinese gingal guns firing massive shells were used accurately, and inflicted severe wounds and death on the Allied troops during the Boxer Rebellion. In some cases, primitive weapons like Chinese spears were more effective than British bayonets in close quarter fighting.

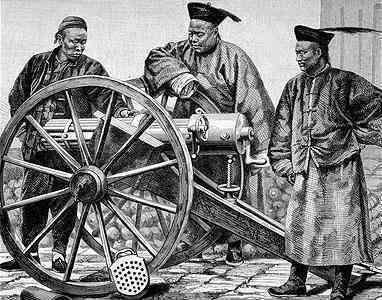
Chinese Qing Empire officers with the French Montigny mitrailleuse gun

During the Boxer Rebellion, Imperial Chinese forces deployed a weapon called "electric mines" on June 15, at the river Peiho river before the Battle of Dagu Forts (1900), to prevent the western Eight-Nation Alliance from sending ships to attack. This was reported by American military intelligence in the United States. War Dept. by the United States. Adjutant-General's Office. Military Information Division. Different Chinese armies were modernized to different degrees by the Qing dynasty. For example, during the Boxer Rebellion, in contrast to the Manchu and other Chinese soldiers who used arrows and bows, the Muslim Kansu Braves cavalry had the newest carbine rifles. The Muslim Kansu Braves used the weaponry to inflict numerous defeats upon western armies in the Boxer Rebellion, in the Battle of Langfang, and, numerous other engagements around Tianjin. The Times noted that "10,000 European troops were held in check by 15,000 Chinese braves". Chinese artillery fire caused a steady stream of casualties upon the western soldiers. During one engagement, heavy casualties were inflicted on the French and Japanese, and the British and Russians lost some men. Chinese artillerymen during the battle also learned how to use their German bought Krupp artillery accurately, outperforming European gunners. The Chinese artillery shells slammed right on target into the western armies military areas. After the skirmishes that ended the 55-day Siege of the International Legations by the Boxers, missionary Arthur Henderson Smith noted, " ... whatever else the enterprise may have accomplished it disposed once for all of the favourite proposition so often advanced that it would be possible for a small but well organized and thoroughly equipped foreign force to march through China from end to end without effective opposition."

Historians have judged the Qing dynasty's vulnerability and weakness to foreign imperialism in the 19th century to be based mainly on its maritime naval weakness while it achieved military success against westerners on land, the historian Edward L. Dreyer said that "China’s nineteenth-century humiliations were strongly related to her weakness and failure at sea. At the start of the Opium War, China had no unified navy and no sense of how vulnerable she was to attack from the sea; British forces sailed and steamed wherever they wanted to go......In the Arrow War (1856–60), the Chinese had no way to prevent the Anglo-French expedition of 1860 from sailing into the Gulf of Zhili and landing as near as possible to Beijing. Meanwhile, new but not exactly modern Chinese armies suppressed the midcentury rebellions, bluffed Russia into a peaceful settlement of disputed frontiers in Central Asia, and defeated the French forces on land in the Sino-French War (1884–85). But the defeat of the fleet, and the resulting threat to steamship traffic to Taiwan, forced China to conclude peace on unfavorable terms."

The Qing dynasty forced Russia to hand over disputed territory in the Treaty of Saint Petersburg (1881), in what was widely seen by the west as a diplomatic victory for the Qing. Russia acknowledged that Qing China potentially posed a serious military threat. Mass media in the west during this era portrayed China as a rising military power due to its modernization programs and as a major threat to the western world, invoking fears that China would successfully conquer western colonies like Australia.

=== List of arsenals in Qing China ===
- Hanyang Arsenal
- Jiangnan Shipyard
- Taiyuan Arsenal
- Lanchow Arsenal (Lanzhou Arsenal) built by the Chu Army
- Foochow Arsenal
- Great Hsi-Ku Arsenal
- Jinling Arsenal

=== List of modernized armies in Qing China ===
- Jiangnan Daying
- Yong Ying
- Xiang Army
- Chu Army
- Huai Army
- Kansu Braves
- Hushenying
- Peking Field Force
- Shenjiying
- Wuwei Corps
- Beiyang Army
- New Army
- Beiyang Fleet
- Fujian Fleet
- Nanyang Fleet
- Shuishiying

== Military philosophy ==
Chinese military thought's most famous tome is Sun Tzu's Art of War, written in the Warring States Era. In the book, Sun Tzu laid out several important cornerstones of military thought, such as:

- The importance of intelligence.
- The importance of manoeuvring so your enemy is hit in his weakened spots.
- The importance of morale.
- How to conduct diplomacy so that you gain more allies and the enemy lose allies.
- Having the moral advantage.
- The importance of national unity.
- All warfare is based on deception.
- The importance of logistics.
- The proper relationship between the ruler and the general. Sun Tzu holds the ruler should not interfere in military affairs.
- Difference between Strategic and Tactical strategy.
- No country has benefited from a prolonged war.
- Subduing an enemy without using force is best.

Sun Tzu's work became the cornerstone of military thought, which grew rapidly. By the Han dynasty, no less than 11 schools of military thought were recognized. During the Song dynasty, a military academy was established.

== Equipment and technology ==
In their various campaigns, the Chinese armies through the ages, employed a variety of equipment in the different arms of the army. The most notable weaponry used by the Chinese consisted of crossbows, bombs, rockets, land mines and other gunpowder weapons, but the Chinese also made many advances on conventional iron weapons such as swords and spears as well as crossbows, that were considered far superior to other contemporary weapons. However, the most notorious and iconic armament of Chinese armies, was the crossbow.

=== Crossbow ===
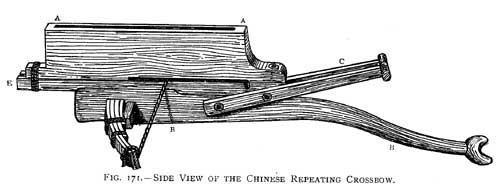
Chinese repeating crossbow (non-recurve version - ones used for war would be recurved)

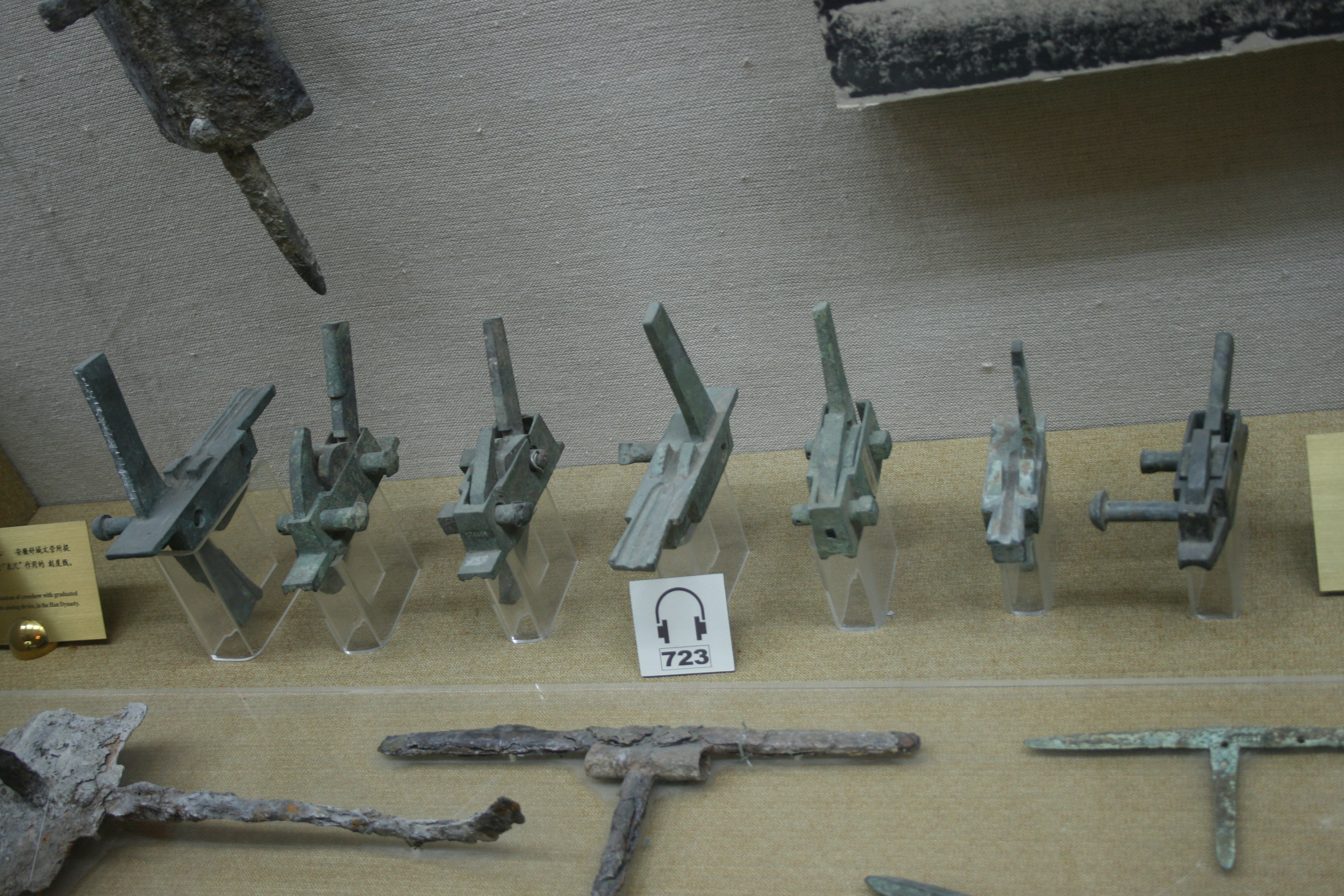
Western Han dynasty crossbow trigger mechanisms

The crossbow, invented by the Chinese in the 7th century BC, was considered to be the most important weapon of the Chinese armies in ancient times. Crossbows could be given to a conscript with little training, and yet massed to devastating effect due to the ease of aiming the crossbow with greater precision compared to a traditional recurve bow. The crossbow also had greater firing velocity, and allowed a much deeper penetration into armor compared to traditional composite bows, which allowed Chinese armies to deploy huge amounts of firepower. In China, the crossbow was one of the primary military weapons from the Warring States period until the end of the Han dynasty, when armies were composed of up to 30 to 50 percent crossbowmen. Han soldiers were required to arm an "entry level" crossbow with a draw-weight of 76 kg/168 lb to qualify as an entry level crossbowman, while it was claimed that a few elite troops were capable of arming crossbows by the hands-and-feet method, with a draw-weight in excess of 340 kg/750 lb.

The mechanical design of the ancient Chinese crossbow was very complex, due to the nature of the firing mechanism. The mechanical design of the Chinese crossbow was so unique, that many experts including historian Homer Dubs claim that the Chinese crossbow firing mechanism was almost as complex as the modern-invention of the rifle, and could only be reproduced by very competent mechanics which only Chinese engineers could understand. This gave an additional advantage, as this made the crossbow "capture-proof" as even if China's barbarian enemies captured them they would not be able to reproduce the weapon. Crossbow ammunition could also only be used in crossbows, and was useless in the conventional bows employed by China's nomadic enemies.

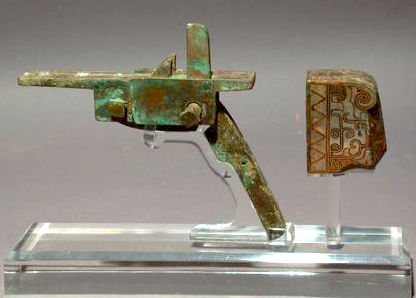
A crossbow trigger mechanism from the Warring States period or Western Han

In combat, crossbows were often fitted with grid sights to help aim, and several different sizes were used. During the Song dynasty, huge artillery crossbows were used that could shoot several bolts at once, killing many men at a time. Even cavalrymen were sometimes issued with crossbows. It was recorded that the crossbow could "penetrate a large elm from a distance of 140 paces". The repeating crossbow (also known as Chu Ko Nu) was invented during the Warring States period. Even though it could rapidly fire up to 7–10 bolts in 15–20 seconds, its firing power was weaker compared to a standard crossbow, and could not penetrate heavy armor as effectively. It was generally regarded as a non-military weapon suited for civilians, mostly used for defending against robbers or in times of self-defense.

=== Gunpowder weapons ===
As inventors of gunpowder, the Chinese were the first to deploy gunpowder weapons. A large variety of gunpowder weapons were produced, including guns, cannons, mines, the flamethrower, bombs, and rockets. After the rise of the Ming dynasty, China began to lose its lead in gunpowder weapons to the west. This became partially evident when the Manchus' began to rely on the Jesuits to run their cannon foundry, at a time when European powers had assumed the global lead in gunpowder warfare through their Military Revolution.

==== Guns and cannons ====
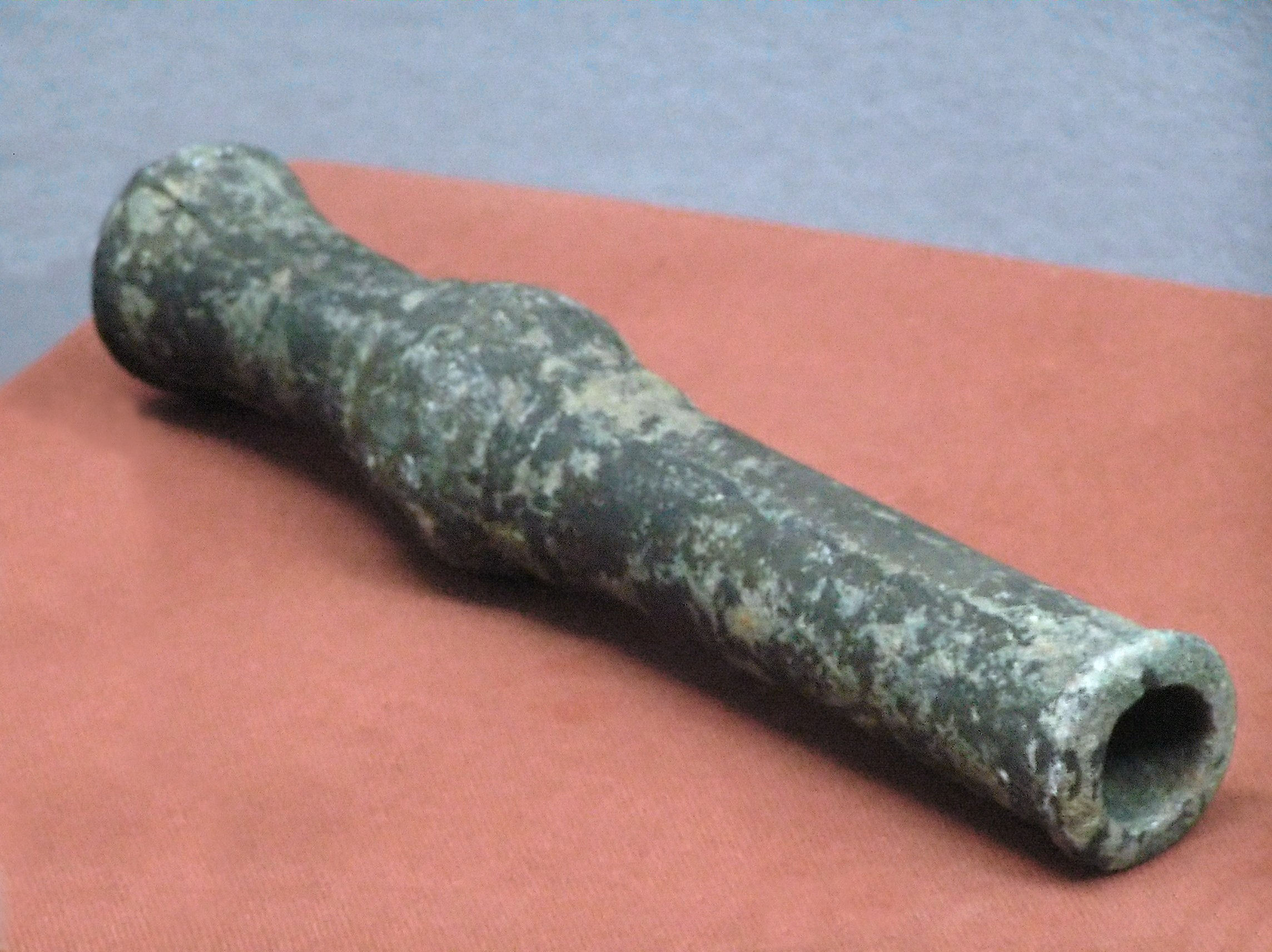
Hand cannon from the Mongol Yuan dynasty (1271–1368)

The first "proto-gun", the fire lance, was introduced in 905 AD. This consisted of a bamboo or metal tube attached to a spear filled with gunpowder that could be ignited at will, with a range of five metres. It was capable of killing or maiming several soldiers at a time and was mass-produced and used especially in the defense of cities. Later versions of the fire lance dropped the spear point and had more gunpowder content.

Traditionally interpreted as a wind god, a sculpture in Sichuan was found holding a bombard, and the date must be as early as AD 1128 These cast-iron hand cannons and erupters were mostly fitted to ships and fortifications for defense.

Cannon were used by Ming dynasty forces at the Battle of Lake Poyang. Ming dynasty era ships had bronze cannon. One shipwreck in Shandong had a cannon dated to 1377 and an anchor dated to 1372. From the 13th to 15th centuries cannon armed Chinese ships also traveled throughout south east Asia.

==== Bombs, grenades and mines ====
High explosive bombs were another innovation developed by the Chinese in the 10th century. These consisted largely of round objects covered with paper or bamboo filled with gunpowder that would explode upon contact and set fire to anything flammable. These weapons, known as "thunderclap bombs", were used by defenders in sieges on attacking enemies and also by trebuchets, which hurled huge numbers of them onto the enemy. A new improved version of these bombs, called the "thunder-crash" bomb, was introduced in the 13th century; it was covered in cast iron, was highly explosive, and hurled shrapnel at the enemy. These weapons were not only used by Song China, but also its Jur'chen and Mongol enemies. In the history of the Jur'chen Jin dynasty, the use of cast-iron gunpowder bombs against the Mongols is described.

By the time of the Ming dynasty, Chinese technology had progressed to making large land mines, many of them were deployed on the northern border.

==== Flamethrower ====
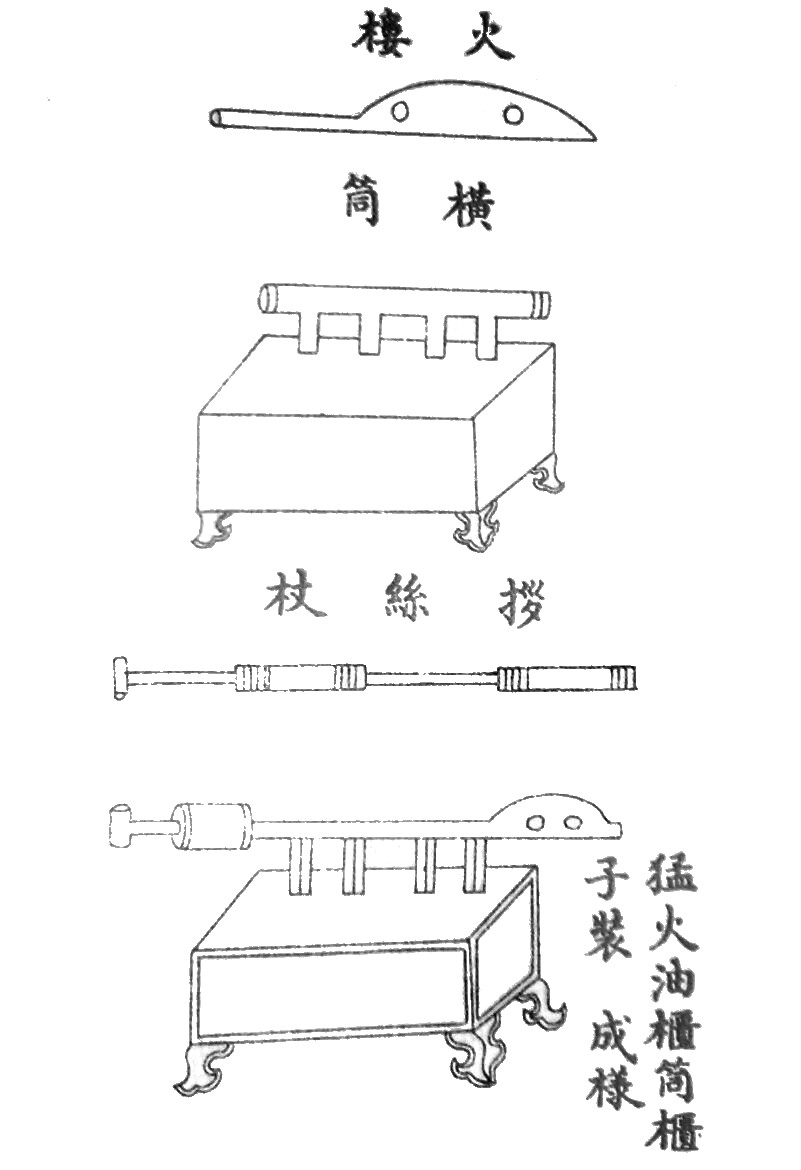
A Chinese flamethrower from the Wujing Zongyao manuscript of 1044 AD, Song dynasty

Flamethrowers were employed in naval combat in the Yangtze river, and large-scale use of the flamethrower is recorded in 975, when the Southern Tang navy employed flamethrowers against Song naval forces, but the wind blew the other way, causing the Southern Tang fleet to be immolated, and allowing the Song to conquer South China. During Song times, the flamethrower was used not only in naval combat but also in defense of cities, where they were placed on the city walls to incinerate any attacking soldiers.

==== Rockets ====
During the Ming dynasty, the design of rockets were further refined and multi-stage rockets and large batteries of rockets were produced. Multi-stage rockets were introduced for naval combat. Like other technology, knowledge of rockets were transmitted to the Middle East and the West through the Mongols, where they were described by Arabs as "Chinese arrows".

=== Infantry ===
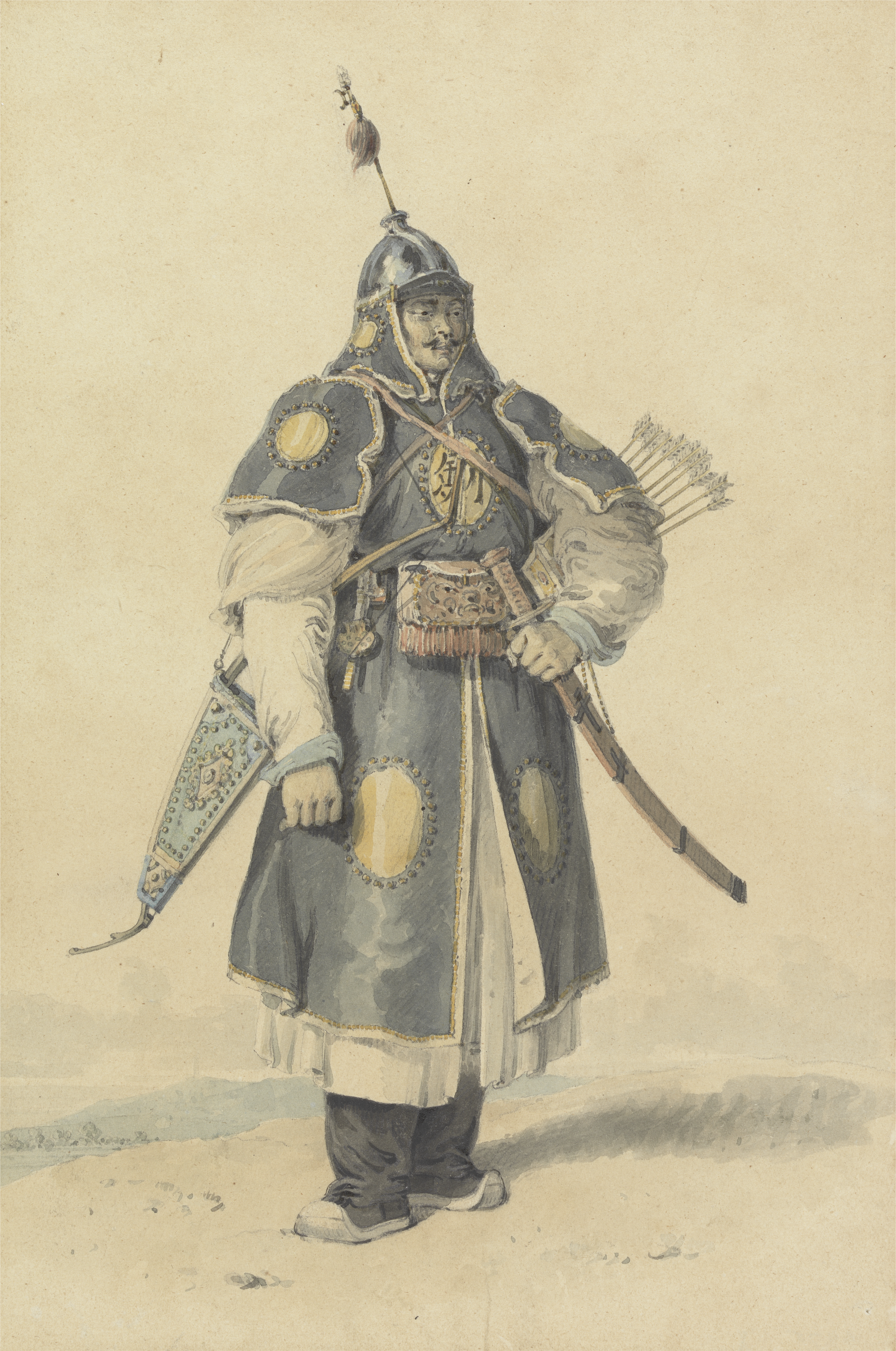
Portrait of a Chinese soldier

In the 2nd century BC, the Han began to produce steel from cast iron. New steel weapons were manufactured that gave Chinese infantry an edge in close-range fighting, though swords and blades were also used. The Chinese infantry were given extremely heavy armor in order to withstand cavalry charges, some 29.8 kg of armor during the Song dynasty.

=== Cavalry ===
The cavalry was equipped with heavy armor in order to crush a line of infantry, though light cavalry was used for reconnaissance. However, Chinese armies lacked horses and their cavalry were often inferior to their horse archer opponents. Therefore, in most of these campaigns, the cavalry had to rely on the infantry to provide support. Between the Jin and Tang dynasty, fully armored cataphracts were introduced in combat. An important innovation was the invention of the stirrup. From early Indian invention, which allowed cavalrymen to be much more effective in combat; this innovation later spread to East, north and west via the nomadic populations of central Asia and to the west by the Avars. However, some believe northern nomads were responsible for this innovation.

Some authors, such as Lynn White, claim the use of the stirrup in Europe stimulated development of the medieval knights which characterized feudal Europe. However, this thesis was disputed in the Great Stirrup Controversy by historians such as Bernard Bachrach, although it has been pointed out that the Carolingian riders may have been the most expert cavalry of all at its use.

=== Chemical weapons ===
During the Han dynasty, state manufacturers were producing stink bombs and tear gas bombs that were used effectively to suppress a revolt in 178 AD. Poisonous materials were also employed in rockets and crossbow ammunition to increase their effectiveness.

=== Logistics ===
The Chinese armies also benefited from a logistics system that could supply hundreds of thousands of men at a time. An important innovation by the Chinese was the introduction of an efficient horse harness in the 4th century BC, strapped to the chest instead of the neck, an innovation later expanded to a collar harness. This innovation, along with the wheelbarrow, allowed large-scale transportation to occur, allowing huge armies numbering hundreds of thousands of men in the field.

Chinese armies were also backed by a vast complex of arms-producing factories. State-owned factories turned out weapons by the thousands, though some dynasties (such as the Later Han) privatized their arms industry and acquired weapons from private merchants.

=== Rations ===
During the Han dynasty, Chinese developed methods of food preservation for military rations during campaigns such as drying meat into jerky and cooking, roasting, and drying grain.

== Command ==
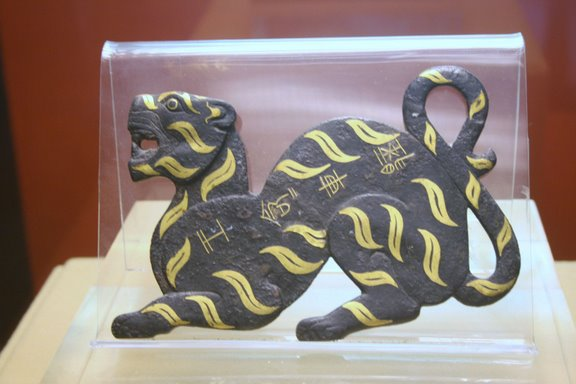
A tiger tally or hǔfú (虎符), made of bronze with gold inlay, found in the tomb of the King of Nanyue at Guangzhou, from the Western Han dynasty, dated 2nd century BC. Tiger Tallies were separated into two pieces, one held by the emperor, the other given to a military commander as a symbol of imperial authority and the ability to command troops.

In early Chinese armies, command of armies was based on birth rather than merit. For example, in the State of Qi during the Spring and Autumn period (771 BC–476 BC), command was delegated to the ruler, the crown prince, and the second son. By the time of the Warring States period, generals were appointed based on merit rather than birth, the majority of whom were talented individuals who gradually rose through the ranks.

Nevertheless, Chinese armies were sometimes commanded by individuals other than generals. For example, during the Tang dynasty, the emperor instituted "Army supervisors" who spied on the generals and interfered in their commands, although most of these practices were short-lived as they disrupted the efficiency of the army.

== See also ==
- Mufu
- History of the Great Wall of China
- List of Chinese battles
