= Chu Army =

Qing-era standing army

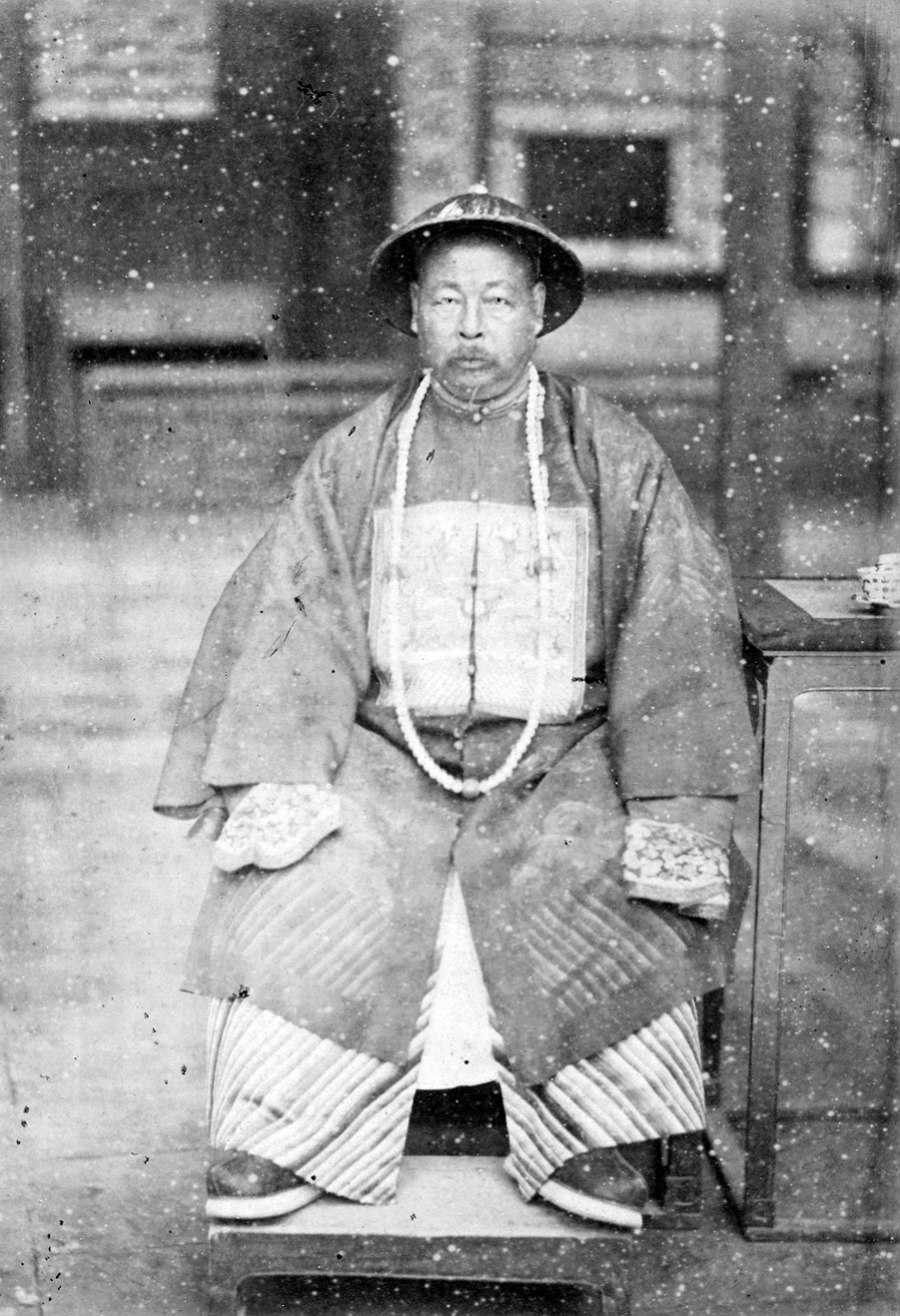
Photo of Zuo Zongtang in 1875.

The Chu Army (Chinese: 楚勇; pinyin: Chǔ Yǒng; lit. 'Chu (state) braves') was a standing regional army organized by Zuo Zongtang. The name is taken from the Hunan region where the Army was raised. The Army was financed through local nobles and gentry, as opposed to the central government.

The Chu Army was one of two armies known as the Hunan Army. Another Hunan Army, called the Xiang Army, was created by Zeng Guofan to fight in the Taiping Rebellion. Remnants of the Xiang Army that fought the Taiping were then known as the "Old Hunan Army".

== Dungan Revolt (1862–1877) ==
The Xiang Army was an example of the regional Yong Ying armies that emerged in late Qing dynasty China, separate from the Manchu Eight Banners and Green Standard Army. The main points of difference were in their regional affiliations, since these forces were often raised and led via kinship and local networks; and their contravention of the normal Chinese military policy where army generals were frequently rotated to prevent ambitious commanders building power bases. In the case of the Yong Ying, the need for unit cohesion meant that officers were appointed by commanders and remained in command of their units throughout entire campaigns.

General Zuo Zongtang commanded the Hunan Army in the Dungan Revolt, In December 1872 sending 3,000 of them to Suzhou in Gansu.

In Hunan, the scholar literi were "militarized", and more commoners enlisted as officers in the army.

Zuo raised a 55,000 man army from Hunan before he began the final push to reconquer Gansu from the Dungan rebels, they participated along with other regional armies (the Sichuan, Anhui, and Henan armies also joined the battle).

The Hunan Army was extensively infiltrated by the anti-Qing Gelaohui secret society, who started several mutinies during the Dungan Revolt, delaying crucial offensives. Zuo put down the mutinies and executed those involved.

Another commander of the Hunan Army during the revolt was the Manchu Dolonga (To-lung-a), who had been transferred from a Manchu banner. His leadership over the Hunan forces defeated the Muslim rebels and totally destroyed their position in Shaanxi province, expelling them to Gansu. Lei Zhengguan (Lei Cheng-kuan) was a commander under Dolonga, who fought successfully against the rebels, enabling Gansu roads to be reopened after capturing crucial cities.

Xiang Army and other Han Chinese male soldiers and sojourners bought Turki Musulman (Uyghur) girls as wives from their parents after Zuo Zongtang's reconquest of Xinjiang, and the Han and Uyghurs often relied on Hui intermediaries to translate and broker the marriages. A Han Chinese man with the surname Li bought a young Uyghur woman from two Uyghur men who kidnapped her in 1880. They were employed by the magistrate of Pichan. A Turpan Uyghur girl named Ruo-zang-le who was 12 was sold for 30 taels in 1889 in Qitai to a young Han Chinese Shanxi man named Liu Yun. She became pregnant with his child in 1892. Han Chinese men viewed the toyluq they paid in silver for their Uyghur brides as a bride price. Uyghur Muslim women married Han Chinese men in Xinjiang in the late 19th and early 20th centuries. Han Chinese men, Hindu men, Armenian men, Jewish men and Russian men were married by Uyghur Muslim women who could not find husbands.

== Taiwan ==
Hunan Army troops were also stationed in Taiwan. They were commanded by Liu Ao, and numbered 16 battalions, and came under Liu Mingchuan's command after he became governor of Taiwan. Another army which was stationed on Taiwan was the Anhui Army. They were given modern, breechloading guns, and trained in modern warfare. Western instructors were brought in. Liu had stated that the two armies were "strong crossbows, the strength of which has been spent". He said on the rifles that "Unless the sights of the firearms are set accurately, the aim cannot be gauged for either distance or height : to have a rifle would then be the same as having none".

== Main leaders ==
- Zuo Zongtang

== See also ==
- Tuanlian
