= Uyghur women under Qing rule =

In the 18th century, the Qing dynasty conquered the Junggar Basin (Dzungaria) and the Tarim Basin (Southern Xinjiang), uniting them under the name Xinjiang. Qing rule in Xinjiang is said to have negatively affected the position of women in the society of Turkic Muslims now known as the Uyghurs.

== Intermarriage between Han and Turks ==
There were eras in Xinjiang's history where intermarriage was common. "Laxity" led Uyghur women to marry Chinese men and not wear veils after Yaqub Beg's rule ended. Uyghurs also believe that they have Han Chinese ancestry from historical intermarriage (see around 10th century), such as those living in Turpan. From 1911-1949 when the Kuomintang ruled, many Uyghur girls approached Han soldiers for relationships.

Although banned in Islam, a form of temporary marriage from which the man could easily terminate and ignore the traditional contract was created. It was called "marriage of convenience" by Turkic Muslims in Xinjiang. However such marriages were repeatedly conducted by an Emam between Ughlug Beg's great-granddaughter Nura Han and Ahmad Kamal.

=== Benefits ===
The Uyghur women were also not subjected to any legal binding to their Chinese husbands so they could make their Chinese husbands provide them as much money as she wanted for her relatives and herself since otherwise the women could just leave. Moreover, the property of Chinese men was left to their Uyghur wives after they died. Uyghur women who intermarried considered Uyghur men to be inferior husbands to Chinese and other foreigners. Because they were viewed as "impure" Islamic cemeteries banned the Uyghur wives of Chinese men from being buried within them. The Uyghur women got around this problem by donating to shrines and buying graves in other towns. Besides Chinese men, others in Xinjiang such as Afghans, Hindus, Armenians, Jews, Russians, and Badakhshanis intermarried with local Uyghur women.

Le Coq reported that in his time, Uyghurs sometimes distrusted Tungans (Hui Muslims) more than Han Chinese, so that a Tungan would never be given a Uyghur woman in marriage by her father, while a (Han) Chinese men could be given a Uyghur woman in marriage by her father. In Kashgar 1933 the Chinese kept concubines and spouses who were Turkic women.

=== Qing "temporary marriages" ===
Xinjiang temporary marriage, marriage de convenance, was called "waqitliq toy" in Uyghur. It was one of the prevalent forms of polygamy, "the mulla who performs the ceremony arranging for the divorce at the same time." The women and men married for a fixed period of time, several days to a week. While temporary marriage was banned in Russian Turkestan, Chinese-ruled Xinjiang permitted the temporary marriage where it was widespread.

As a result, Chinese merchants and soldiers, and some foreigners like Russians, foreign Muslims, and other Uyghur merchants all engaged in temporary marriages with Uyghur women. Since a lot of foreigners lived in Yarkand, temporary marriage flourished there more than it did in areas towards Kucha's east.

The basic formalities of normal marriages were maintained as a facade even in temporary marriages. Prostitution by Uyghur women due to the buying of daughters from impoverished families and divorced women was recorded by Scotsman George Hunter. Mullahs officiated temporary marriages; and both the divorce and the marriage proceedings were undertaken in the same ceremony if the marriage was only to last for a certain arranged time. There was also a temporary marriage bazaar in Yangi Hissar according to Nazaroff. Temporary marriages especially violated Sunni Islam Sharia.

=== Mixed offspring ===
The local society accepted the Uyghur women and Chinese men's mixed offspring as their own people despite the marriages violating Sharia. Uyghur women also conducted "temporary marriages" with Chinese men such as nearby Chinese soldiers temporarily stationed for tours of duty. After these marriages the Chinese men returned to their own cities and "sold" their mixed daughters and Uyghur wives to his comrades. They took their sons with them if they could afford it but otherwise left them behind.

Valikhanov claimed that the mixed children of Turkistan were referred to as çalğurt. Uyghur women were criticized for having "negative character" by a Kashgari Uyghur woman's Tibetan husband. Racist views of each other's ethnicities between partners in interethnic marriages still persisted at times. During this era it was mostly Uyghur women marrying foreign men with a few cases of the opposite occurring.

Turkic Muslims in different areas of Xinjiang held derogatory views of each other such as claiming that Chinese men were welcomed by the loose Yamçi girls.

Andijani (Kokandi) Turkic Muslim merchants (from modern Uzbekistan), who shared the same religion, similar culture, cuisine, clothing, and phenotypes with the Altishahri Uyghurs, also frequently married local Altishahri women. The name "chalgurt" was also applied to their mixed race daughters and sons. The daughters were left behind with their Uyghur Altishahri mothers while the sons were taken by the Kokandi fathers when they returned to their homeland.

The Qing then banned Khoqandi merchants from marrying Kashgari women. Due to 'group jealously'; religious, ethnic differences; and sex; disputes broke out due to Chinese and Uighur. The Uighur locals also viewed fellow Turkic Muslim Andijanis as competitors for "their own women." A Uyghur proverb said "Do not let a man from Andijan into your house."

== Women in Uyghur society ==
The lack of Han Chinese women in Xinjiang led to Uyghur Muslim women marrying Han Chinese men. Moreover, Unmarried Muslim Uyghur women married non-Muslims like Chinese if they could not find a Muslim husband. These women sometimes faced hostility from their families. In 1917 the Swedish Christian missionary J. E. Lundahl said that the local Muslim women in Xinjiang married Chinese men because of a lack of Chinese women, and that the relatives of the woman and other Muslims reviled the women for their marriages.

=== Societal expectations ===
Among Uyghurs it was thought that God designed women to endure hardship and work, the word for "helpless one", ʿājiza, was used to call women who were not married while women who were married were called mazlūm among Turkic Muslims in Xinjiang. However, the actual position of Uyghur women in society varied considerably and was determined by economic and political factors. Divorce and remarriage was facile for the women.

=== Marriage ===
Women of Khotan, Yarkand, and Kashgar usually married at ages 14 – 15; sometimes it was even 12 years for girls and 13 for boys. Cousin marriages were practiced by the wealthy. There was no marriage between adherents of the Artish located pro-China Black Mountain and the Kucha located anti-China White Mountain sects. Marriages were arranged and arbitrated with financial and religious obligations from both parties. Less complicated arrangements were made for widows and divorcees who wanted to marry again. Wives were often judged according to how many children they could bear. Ceremonies were held after the birth of a child. Public shaming was arranged for adulterers. Women called to Allah to grant them marriage by the shrines of saints.

Child marriages for girls was very common and the Uyghurs called girls "overripe" if they were not married by 16 or 18 years old. Marriages were arranged, and husbands were sought out for suitable matches by parents. The high number of "child marriages" at an extreme young age led to high divorce rates.

=== Veils ===
Traveller Ahmad Kamal writes an account in Land without Laughter , which describes his trip to Xinjiang during the Kumul Rebellion. In the streets of the bazar of Ürümqi Uyghur women did not veil unlike southern Xinjiang's Muslim bazars where women veiled in public. Nomadic women did not wear the face veil and neither did peasant women. Only urban rich did. Kamal saw an unveiled peasant woman Jennett Han. The face veil was only allowed to be taken off in the house and were worn just for their husbands and fellow women to see. When Kamal and his companions spied on a boudoir in a Uyghur garden, the young women dropped their veils whereas the "older hags" were angry (at the peeping Toms).

Face covering veils with caps of otter were worn in the streets by women in public in Xinjiang. In order to properly mount her stirrup with her foot, one Uyghur woman had to temporarily lift her veil to see better. Ahmad Kamal's girlfriend Nura Han covered her face with the veil but then removed it after marrying him.

One saying was that:

"Muslim maidens wear the red that bespeaks a virgin, and the transparency of their veils reveals a desire to change their raiment's hue."

=== Prostitution ===
Uyghur prostitutes were encountered by Carl Gustaf Emil Mannerheim who wrote they were especially to be found in Khotan. He commented on "venereal diseases".

Different ethnic groups had different attitudes toward prostitution. George W. Hunter noted that while Tungan Muslims would almost never prostitute their daughters, Uyghur Muslims would, which was why Uyghur prostitutes were common around the country.

== See also ==
- Xinjiang under Qing rule
