= Yong Ying =

Type of regional militia in Qing China

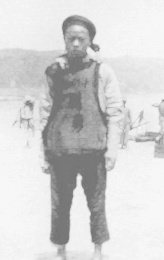
A Brave (勇; yǒng). Qing soldiers were distinguished as regulars (兵; bīng) or braves by the characters on their uniforms.

Yong Ying (Chinese: 勇營; pinyin: Yǒng Yíng; Wade–Giles: yung-ying; lit. 'brave camps') were a type of regional army in the Qing dynasty that emerged in the 19th century, which fought in most of China's wars after the Opium War and numerous rebellions exposed the ineffectiveness of the Manchu Eight Banners and Green Standard Army. The Yong Ying were created from the earlier tuanlian militias.

== Tuanlian history ==
Tuanlian (團練) is the Chinese term for localised village militias created in the Zhou dynasty. In May 1645, Ming rebel leader Li Zicheng was killed by a tuanlian of local landowners in Hubei province.

During the Jiaqing reign, with the corrupt and ineffective official military establishment of the Eight Banners and Green Standard Army incapable of curbing the White Lotus Rebellion, the Qing court began to order local gentry and landowners in all ten provinces to organise tuanlian for self-defense, with both funding and control in the hands of local gentry and landowners.

== Yong ==
Yong (Chinese:勇), literally "braves", was the official name for members of the militia, which was recruited from the local civilian (Han Chinese) population. These "braves" were grouped into units or battalions (ying), known as the "Yong Ying". Yong were not regarded as part of the official imperial army of Eight Banners or Green Standard, with their funding and logistics provided by civilian society, not the imperial governments.

The Xiang Army, a "Yung-ying" army in Qing dynasty China, was separate from the Manchu Eight Banners and Green Standard Army. It used modern weapons and the officers were never rotated, so relationships formed between officers and the troops, unlike in the Green Standard and Banner forces.

It was recorded that

Although rations came from public funds, the yung-ying troops were nevertheless grateful to the officers of the battalion for selecting them to be put on the rolls, as if they had received personal favours from the officers. Since in ordinary times there existed [between the officers and the troops] relations of kindness as well as mutual confidence, in battle it could be expected that they would see each other through hardship and adversity.

The soldiers of the Yong ying militias were often poorly equipped with Jingals, swords, spears and antiquated firearms though they did possess modern firearms it was not the norm. They were often poorly housed in barracks and left idle with many becoming addicted to opium and gambling. The commanders of these militias however gained vast power becoming appointed to the positions of governor-generals and governors between 1861 and 1890 of the 44 governor-generals appointed 20 were militia commanders and of the 117 governors appointed in the same time period over 52 were militia commanders with 25% of the governors not possessing the 2 highest grades of the imperial civil service exam

== List of Yong Ying Armies ==
- Chu Army
- Xiang Army
- Huai Army
- Kansu Braves

== See also ==
- Warlord
