= Xiang Army =

Chinese army during the Taiping Rebellion

Xiang Army (Old Hunan Army)
- 湘軍
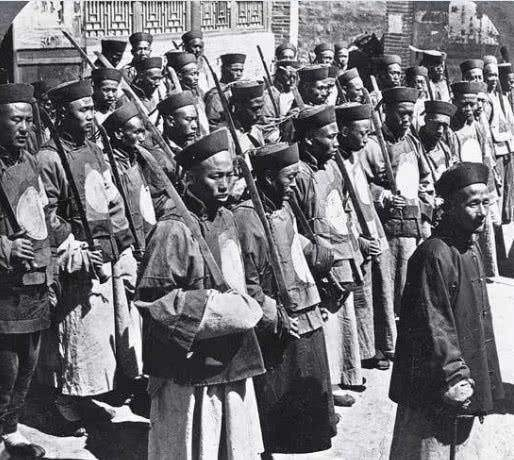
- Soldiers of the Xiang Army
- Active: 1850 – 1864 ("Old Hunan Army"); 1864 – 1895 (remnants and reorganized armies)
- Country: Qing China
- Allegiance: Qing dynasty
- Type: Militia, Yong Ying, eventual standing army
- Size: 17,000; 360,000 (1860)
- Engagements: Taiping Rebellion; Nian Rebellion; Dungan Revolt

Commanders
- Commander-in-chief/"Leader": Zeng Guofan
- Ceremonial chief: Zuo Zongtang
- Field Marshal: Bao Chao

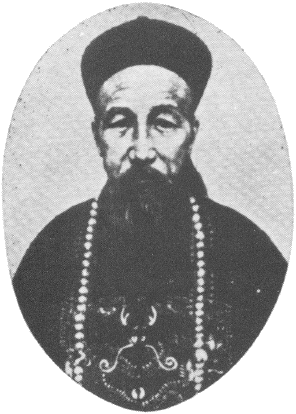
Zeng Guofan, the leader of the Xiang Army

The Xiang Army or Hunan Army (Chinese: 湘軍; pinyin: Xiāng Jūn) was a standing army organized by Zeng Guofan from existing regional and village militia forces called tuanlian to contain the Taiping Rebellion in Qing China (1850 to 1864). The name is taken from the Hunan region where the Army was raised. The Army was financed through local nobles and gentry, as opposed to through the centralized Manchu-led Qing dynasty. The army was mostly disbanded by Zeng after the re-capture of the Taiping capital at Nanking.

Although it was raised specifically to address problems in Hunan, the Army formed the core of the new Qing military establishment, and as such, forever weakened the Manchu influence within the military (Eight Banners). This devolution of centralized command is commonly pointed to as a major reason for the eventual downfall of the Qing and the emergence of regional warlordism in China during the first half of the twentieth century.

The Xiang Army was one of two armies known as the Hunan Army. Another Hunan Army, called the Chu Army, was created by former Xiang commander Zuo Zongtang to fight in the Dungan Revolt (1862–1877). Remnants of the Xiang Army which also fought in the war were then called the "Old Hunan Army".

== History ==
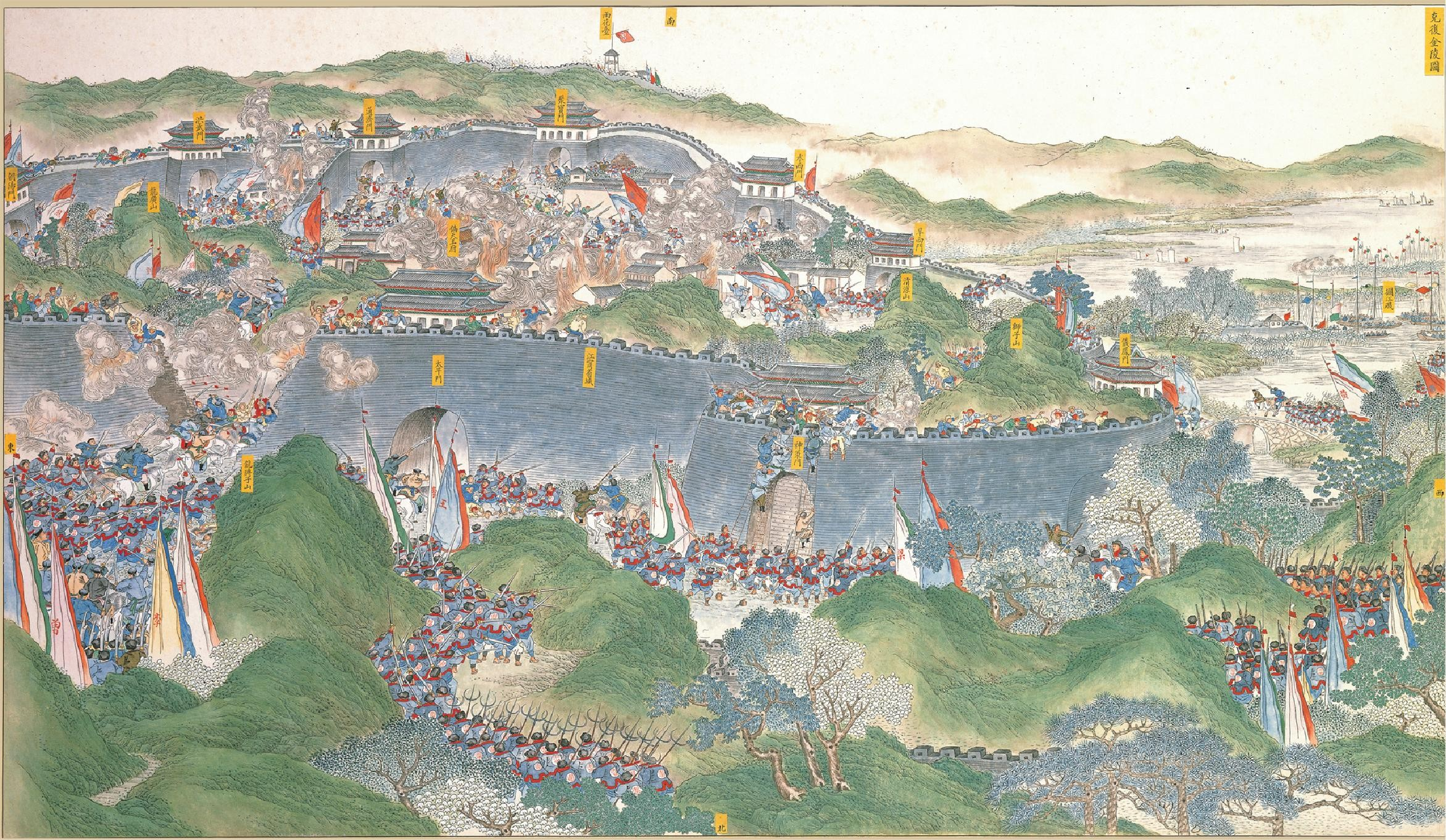
The Xiang Army recapturing Jinling, a suburb of the Taiping capital, July 19, 1864

=== Taiping Rebellion ===
The Taiping rebellion started in December 1850 in Guangxi Province, growing after a series of small victories over the local Qing forces. The revolt rapidly spread northward. In March 1853, between 700,000 and 800,000 Taiping soldiers directed by commander-in-chief Yang Xiuqing took Nanjing, killing 30,000 Manchu civilians and bannermen. The city became the movement's capital and was renamed Tianjing ("Heavenly Capital"). By this point the Taiping Heavenly Kingdom encompassed much of prosperous south and central China, centered on the Yangtze river valley. They continued in their attempts to expand northward, and sent two armies to take the upper Yangtze, while another two attempted to take the new Imperial capital, Beijing. The western drive met with some success, but the Beijing attack failed.

=== Creation ===
Zeng Guofan was tasked with limiting the rebel's attempts to take control of Hunan. In 1852, he was appointed by the Qing court as commissioner of militia organization for Central China. Zeng Guofan expanded the pre-existing tuanlian militia into an armed force with a total of 17,000 men, including thirteen battalions consisting of 6500 men and a navy of ten battalions consisting of 5000 men. It was given the name of Xiang Army, with Zeng Guofan as the Commander-in-chief, accepting orders from Zeng alone. The new rule was termed "Soldiers followed the general, soldiers belonged to the general"(兵隨將轉，兵為將有), contrary to the old military rule before the Northern Song dynasty's "Soldiers had no fixed commander, commander had no fixed soldiers" (兵無常帥，帥無常兵). This new military rule was the direct cause of the Warlord era. These Tuanlian were turned into the Yong Ying Xiang Army.

To fund the army, Zeng convinced the Hunan governor to divert funds from the provincial network of commercial good toll collection stations. Eventually the army founds ways of collecting funds from local landholders and merchants.

=== Campaigns ===
His lieutenants recovered the capital, Changsha, and then Zeng led the recapture of Wuchang and Hanyang, near Hankow, and was rewarded for his success by being appointed vice-president of the Board of War. His Army was so successful that the Qing leaders quickly started using it in place of their own troops, turning it into an Imperial force rather than the local force as it had been raised. In 1860 Zeng was called on to use the Xiang Army to clear Anhui, and was appointed Viceroy of Liangjiang (两江总督, which consisted of the provinces of Jiangxi, Anhui, and Jiangsu). While Charles George Gordon and his "Ever-Victorious Army" were clearing the rebel heartland, Zeng took the opportunity to launch a campaign to retake Nanjing.

The entire area around the city had been cleared of rebel forces in a series of battles starting in June 1863. The battle for the city itself started on March 14, 1864, when Zeng's forces attempted to force the city walls using ladders, but were beaten back. A second attempt used tunnels, but counter-digging and a second wall prevented a breakthrough. On July 3 the Xiang forces had their first victory, taking Dibao Castle. This position allowed them to dig new tunnels and pack them with explosives with the intention of destroying the city walls. A counterattack failed, and on July 19 the explosives were set off, collapsing a large portion of the wall. The city fell after a fierce three-day battle.

The Xiang Army pillaged and robbed the city, killing 100,000 Taiping soldiers and civilians according to Zeng Guofan and setting it on fire. The city burned until July 26, 1864. Zeng was promoted to Marquess (of the First Class) Yiyong (毅勇侯) (Yiyong: 毅 = Endurance 勇 = Courage) .

Almost immediately after the capture of Nanking, Zeng disbanded the 120,000 soldiers under his command, although Zuo kept his forces intact.

== Viceroys ==
After the fall of the Taiping, from 1864 to 1890, over half of the viceroys in China were Xiang Army leaders.

== Total soldiers ==
In 1860, the power of the Xiang Army was unsurpassed, totalling almost 360,000 soldiers. The large main group was led by Zeng Guofan with 130,000 troops. The Qing regular army, the Green Standard Army, totaled about 2,300,000 (included the Xiang Army). Taiping Rebellion soldiers amounted to about 1,800,000 (including 300,000 local gang members who repeatedly changed sides).

After 1864 a significant portion of the Army was disbanded on orders from Zeng. However at units under Zuo Zongtang continue to exist. They numbered around 120,000 by the 1870s.

The Xiang Army also had a small naval army.

== Headquarters ==
Headquarters were located in Qimen County, Anhui from 1853 to 1861. After recovering Anqing, then capital of Anhui in September 1861, the headquarters was moved there because of its proximity to Nanjing.

== Organisation ==
The Hunan army's official Ying (battalion) consisted of 5 officers and 500 soldiers. When the administration and carriers are added the number reaches 688 men. With each battalion being divided into 4 shao (company) and a bodyguard, theoretically each ying was to possess 2 light mortars and 48 jingals with spears, swords and matchlocks compromising the rest of the armament. By 1864 foreign rifles equipped several squads per Ying. 2 to 10 battalions formed a brigade under a Brigadier General with 2 or more Brigadier Generals being able to form an army. The senior commanders often appointed their junior commanders from amongst relatives and friends.

In 1856 the Hunan army possessed approximately 60,000 soldiers all being Hunanese with later recruitment being expanded beyond Hunan it was reported the army numbered 200 Ying or 137,600 soldiers.

== Salary ==
One of Zeng Guofan's priorities for the Xiang Army was finance, understanding that good pay was crucial for battlefield morale. As a result, a Xiang Army soldier's salary was four tael of silver every month, compared to a regular Green Standard soldier's salary of about 1.5 tael of silver per month.

== Main leaders ==
- Zeng Guofan
- Zuo Zongtang
- Zeng Guoquan (曾國荃)
- Hu Linyi (胡林翼)
- Luo Zenan (羅澤南)
- Peng Yulin (彭玉麟)

After the Taiping Rebellion was crushed, the Hunan armies petitioned to the Manchu Court to disband themselves, for fear of rumored rebellion against the Manchus as they had grown too powerful in the eyes of the Manchus. The Manchu Court only agreed to turn Peng Yulin's army into a navy.

== Vice leaders ==
- Li Xubin
- Li Xuyi
- Bao Chao
- Liu Rong
- Liu Kunyi
- Liu Changyou
- Jiang Yili
- Li Hongzhang

== Disarmament and revolution ==
Zeng Guofan began disarming the Xiang Army with the establishment of the Huai Army by Li Hongzhang, one of the most important commanders of the Xiang Army. In 1890, part of the Xiang Army incorporated into a gang and anti-government movement. When the Xinhai Revolution (Chinese Revolution) began in 1911, former comrades of Xiang Army turned against each other. The Republic of China was established on February 12, 1912.

== See also ==
- Tuanlian
- Schluessel, E. (2020). Land of strangers : the civilizing project in Qing Central Asia /. Columbia University Press. ISBN 978-0-231-19754-0.
