= Feng Zicai =

- 馮子才
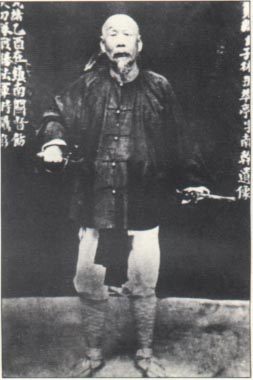

Personal details
- Born: 27 July 1818 Yamchow, Guangdong, Qing dynasty (now Qinzhou, Guangxi)
- Died: 18 September 1903 (aged 85) Southern Guangxi, Qing dynasty

Military service
- Allegiance: Tiandihui (1848-1851); Qing Dynasty (1851-1903)
- Years of service: 1851-1882, 1884-1903
- Unit: Green Standard Army (1851-1864); Guangxi Army (1884-1885)
- Battles/wars: Taiping Rebellion; Battle of Jiangnan (1856); Battle of Jiangnan (1860); Third Battle of Nanjing; Qian Rebellion; Panthay Rebellion(?); Sino-French War; Lạng Sơn Campaign; Battle of Đồng Đăng; Battle of Bang Bo; Retreat from Lạng Sơn

Chinese name
- Traditional Chinese: 馮子才
- Simplified Chinese: 冯子才
Transcriptions
Standard Mandarin
- Hanyu Pinyin: Féng Zǐcaī
- Wade–Giles: Feng^{2} Tsŭ^{3}-ts'ai^{1}
Hakka
- Pha̍k-fa-sṳ: Phùng Chṳ́-chhòi
Yue: Cantonese
- Jyutping: Fung^{4} Zi^{2}-coi^{4}

Posthumous name
- Traditional Chinese: 馮勇毅
- Simplified Chinese: 冯勇毅
Transcriptions
Standard Mandarin
- Hanyu Pinyin: Féng Yǒngyì
- Wade–Giles: Feng^{2} Yung^{3}-yi^{4}
Hakka
- Pha̍k-fa-sṳ: Phùng Yúng-ngi
Yue: Cantonese
- Jyutping: Fung^{4} Jung^{5}-ngai^{6}

Vietnamese name
- Vietnamese: Phùng Tử Tài (馮子才); Phùng Dũng Nghị (馮勇毅)

Feng Zicai (traditional Chinese: 馮子才; simplified Chinese: 冯子才; pinyin: Féng Zǐcaī; Wade–Giles: Feng Tzu-ts'ai) (1818–1903) was a general in the Imperial Army during the Qing dynasty who helped suppress the Taiping Rebellion and fend off a French invasion in the Sino-French War. He was originally a bandit from Qinzhou, Guangxi.

== Early life ==
Feng Zicai’s ancestors lived for generations in Shatouwai (沙头圩), Nanhai County, Guangdong Province (now part of Guangzhou). During the Qianlong era, the area was hit by floods, so Feng Zicai’s grandfather moved to Shawei (沙尾) Village outside Qinzhou. Feng Zicai was born there on 27 July 1818.

Feng Zicai had a very tough childhood. He lost his mother at the age of 4 and his father at 10. His maternal uncle, Mr. Li (黎), wanted to adopt him, but Feng Zicai refused and lived with his grandmother and older brother. He attended school for only two months before quitting. To survive, young Feng Zicai had to follow adults to trade salt, do carpentry, fish and catch shrimp, and escort cattle. After floods destroyed their thatched house, they had to live in a temple, constantly facing hunger and cold with an uncertain daily life. When he was 15, his grandmother passed away.

Driven by the will to survive, Feng Zicai took to the streets, learning to handle knives and swords. By age 20, he had mastered formidable martial skills. From then on, he made a living as a bodyguard, escorting cattle merchants to sell draft oxen in Lianzhou (now in Hepu County).

== Tiandihui ==
In 1848, in Lingshan County, he was ambushed by Liu Babu (劉八部) of the Sanhehui (三合會), a branch of the Tiandihui, and got surrounded. Outnumbered, he was captured and joined them, eventually becoming a leader. In 1851, Liu Babu led his men to pledge loyalty to the Tiandihui leader Ling Shiba (凌十八) and then went with him to Jintian (金田镇), hoping to link up with the Taiping army. However, the Taiping army had already left. When Ling Shiba's group arrived, they were surrounded by local Qing forces sent to attack the Taipings, and most were annihilated. Feng Zicai was among the few who managed to escape. After breaking through, he met Zhang Jiaxiang (張嘉祥), leader of the Yiyitang (怡義堂), another Tiandihui branch, and joined him in Bobai.

After a failed attack on Bobai in May that year, Zhang Jiaxiang saw that neither the Tiandihui nor the Taiping Rebellion could succeed, so that same year he defected to the Qing side. Feng Zicai was persuaded to defect alongside him and surrendered to You Changling (游長齡), the Bobai county magistrate. Zhang Jiaxiang's Tiandihui bandit group was then reorganised into the "Changsheng Braves" battalion (“常胜”勇营) and placed under the command of the Green Standard Army.

== Taiping Rebellion ==
Feng Zicai became a lieutenant colonel under Guangxi provincial commander Xiang Rong, joining him in suppressing peasant uprisings in what is today Guangxi-Guangdong border. Feng was awarded the title "Serguleng Baturu" by the Qing court for actions around Bobai. By 1853, his battalion would be transferred northwards to Jiangnan to fight the main forces of the Taiping Rebellion, being deployed at "Jiangnan Grand Camp" (江南大营) near the Xiao Mausoleum outside of Nanjing.

By 1856, Feng commanded a regiment stationed in northern Jiangsu during the disastrous 1st rout of the Jiangnan Battalion in which Xiang Rong committed suicide and Feng was forced to flee past Danyang. With Xiang Rong's death, he was transferred to serve under Zhang Guoliang. During this tenure, he helped Zhang recapture Zhenjiang and Danyang from Taiping forces and Zhang allegedly once patted him on the back and praised him, saying, "Brave Zi, I am no match for you." (「子勇，余愧弗如。」)

By 1858, Qing forces were able to reestablish the "Jiangnan Grand Camp" (江南大营) and beseige the Taiping garrison in Nanjing. In September, Taiping Army commanders Chen Yucheng (陈玉成) and Li Xiucheng (李秀成) each led their forces to Wuyi (乌衣) in Chuzhou, preparing to jointly attack the Qing imperial commissioner Dexing'a's (德兴阿) "Jiangbei Camp" (江北大营). Feng Zicai led 5,000 troops to cross the river to provide support, but Feng's forces were almost completely wiped out, with only 400 left after retreating back to Jiangnan.

In 1860, the Jiangnan Battalion was once again routed, with Feng once again fleeing to Danyang alongside Zhang Guoliang and being defeated again, with Zhang Guoliang drowning outside the South Gate. Feng retreated with survivors to Zhenjiang, reorganising, and helping to recapture Lishui.

By 1862, he was transferred to garrison Zhenjiang with 3000 men. Later, his troops grew to 20,000 and provisions were often insufficient, yet he never complained. He had guarded Zhenjiang for a total of six years, governed well, and the people were happy to serve him. The Taiping Army attacked Zhenjiang over a hundred times, but could not dislodge Feng Zicai. At that time, most Qing generals north of the Yangtze set up checkpoints to collect taxes themselves. Regarding this, Feng Zicai said, "Is this something a soldier should do?" (「此何與武人事？」) He asked Zeng Guofan to send officials to handle the situation.

After the Fall of Tianjing in July 1864, the Qing court granted many meritorious titles. Feng Zicai was appointed Governor-General of Guangxi, awarded the title of Yellow Riding Jacket (黄马褂), and granted the hereditary title of Cavalry Commandant (騎都尉).

== After Taiping ==
After the Fall of Tianjing in 1864, Taiping activity decreased significantly, allowing Feng to return to his home province of Guangxi and fulfill his duties as Guangxi provincial commander, having been appointed in 1862.

In 1865, he went to Luoding and Xinyi in western Guangdong to suppress Taiping loyalists. Two months later, he moved to Guizhou to help suppress the Qian Rebellion, capturing Quanming (全茗) and Ganxu (感墟). In 1867, he established his base of command in Nanning where he worked to fight bandits, rebels, the Hmong and other groups threatening the Qing Empire in south China and northern Vietnam.

In 1868, Feng's former subordinate Li Yangcai (李扬才), frustrated with his official career, led troops into Vietnam under the pretext of restoring the Le dynasty and attempted to overthrow the ruling Nguyen dynasty. Feng was sent to suppress Li's rebellion and succeeded the next year in 1869, capturing Li alive. During this campaign, he exposed the misconduct of Zhao Wo (赵沃) and other acting officials, who had falsely reported a defeat at the Battle of Xin Street (新街) as a victory. This angered Liu Kunyi, Governor-General of Liangguang, who was personally connected to Zhao Wo. Liu vigorously defended Zhao, allowing the already dismissed Zhao to remain in command, while Feng was sidelined. Feng was replaced by Huang Guilan (黄桂兰), a Huai Army officer. Under the leadership of these two mediocrities, the Guangxi defense forces gradually weakened, becoming ineffective during the Sino-French War.

In 1869, he led an army through Zhennan Pass into Vietnam to pursue rebel forces led by Wu Yacheng (吴亚终), capturing Anbian (安边) and Heyang (河阳). After Wu Yacheng was killed, Feng incorporated some rebels into his own army and was preparing to return to China when Liang Tianxi (梁天锡), a former lieutenant of Wu, broke his surrender agreement and rebelled again. Feng suppressed his rebellion and returned to China the next year in 1870. In 1871, Vietnam was unable to pay tribute to the Qing dynasty due to banditry and rebellion along the Sino-Vietnamese border. Feng was once again sent across the border to quell the chaos. He returned to China the same year.

In 1875, Feng was appointed Governor-general of Guizhou

Returning to Guangxi in 1881, he was getting increasingly ill and thus retired the next year in 1882 to his hometown Qinzhou.

== Sino-French War ==
After the outbreak of the Sino-French War in 1884 and in the aftermath of early Chinese defeats in Sơn Tây and Bắc Ninh, Zhang Shusheng, Governor-General of Liangguang sent an envoy to Feng to ask for his assistance in training militia forces. When the envoy arrived, Feng Zicai was wearing short clothes, barefoot, and driving calves back alongside a herder. The envoy explained the purpose of his visit, but Feng declined. Later, upon hearing of Zhang Shusheng's death, he travelled to Guangzhou to pay his respects.

Zhang Zhidong, the new Governor-General of Liangguang, was also in Guangzhou to take up his new post. He requested Feng to come out of retirement and be reactivated for military service, saying Feng was "an experienced veteran, familiar with border military affairs, and widely respected." (「老成宿將，熟習邊境軍務，威望遠播」)

Feng accepted this request and was placed in command of a chiefly Zhuang armed force in South China, composed mainly of local peasantry and some of Feng's retired imperial troops. On 23 February 1885 the misdeployment of Feng's troops too far from the battlefield was a major factor in the defeat of China's Kwangsi Army in the Battle of Đồng Đăng. However, the 2 French brigades involved were not strong enough to exploit this victory, putting the Tonkin Campaign into a temporary stalemate. During this stalemate, Feng helped fortify positions at Yen Cua Ai. Feng atoned for his incompetence at Đồng Đăng exactly one month later. On 23 and 24 March 1885 Feng's forces were present at the Battle of Bang Bo, in which Francois de Negrier's 2nd Brigade was defeated at Zhennanguan on the Kwangsi-Tonkin border. The Chinese had heavily fortified their position, and although the French captured a number of Chinese outworks on 23 March, their attacks on 24 March failed to make any headway. Eventually the French were counterattacked and forced to retreat with heavy casualties.

Feng Zicai's troops, stationed on the Chinese right wing around the village of Bang Bo, played an important role in the battle, defeating an assault by the French 111th Line Battalion on a position known as 'the long trench'. Feng is said to have encouraged his troops with the words 'You should die rather than bear to see a French army invading Chinese soil!' (「寧死不忍見法軍侵入中國境內」). He is also said to have personally led the Chinese counterattack against the 111th Battalion with a spear alongside 2 of his sons, Feng Xiangrong (冯相荣) and Feng Xianghua (冯相华). The Chinese had been beaten with ease by the French during the Lang Son Campaign of February 1885, and Chinese sources attest to the poor morale of the Chinese army at Bang Bo. Feng Zicai is known to have issued orders that any man who left his post would be executed on the spot, and several dozen Chinese soldiers who fled when the French approached the long trench were immediately shot.

When news of the Ceasefire arrived in mid-April, Feng reportedly angrily protested but was not allowed to continue fighting. During his withdrawal back to China, local Vietnamese reportedly lined the streets crying and Feng himself also began to shed tears. Upon entering Longzhou, soldiers and civilians alike knelt to welcome him for a distance of 30 li.

Upon completion of his withdrawal, Feng was ordered to oversee defenses in the Qinlian area surrounding his hometown of Qinzhou in Southern Guangxi. He was also granted the title of "Taizi Shaobao" (太子少保) and his hereditary title was promoted to "Third-Rank Light Cavalry Commander" (三等轻车都尉).

== Later life ==
In 1886, Feng went to Qiongzhou in Hainan to suppress a rebellion by local Hlai people, with the Qing court issuing an edict praising him. However, he also worked extensively with the local Hlai to develop the mountainous inland areas of Hainan, mobilizing young Hlai men to clear land and build roads, and established schools. Feng's defiant words to his troops at Bang Bo were sculpted on a giant stone on Wuzhi Mountain, the highest mountain in Hainan

He later served as Governor of Yunnan and Guizhou.

In 1894, the Qing court officially granted him the title of Minister. That same year, the First Sino-Japanese War broke out and Feng was sent back to Zhenjiang in Jiangnan, where he spent most of the Taiping rebellion, to prepare for deployment. However, the war ended before Feng's troops could be deployed and Feng withdrew from Jiangnan. He spent the next 2 years keeping order in Yunnan as China and British Burma settled a border dispute and the British mopped up the last of Burmese resistance in the highlands along the Sino-Burmese border.

In 1900, with the outbreak of the Boxer Rebellion, Feng submitted a petition requesting to lead several battalions to the capital to support the emperor. The Qing court praised his loyalty and bravery but did not approve his request.

In 1901, Feng was transferred to Guizhou but was relieved of his post the next year in 1902 due to illness.

In 1903, there was an uprising by secret societies in the Qinlian area and Cen Chunxuan, then governor of Liangguang asked Feng to come out of retirement and lead militia forces to suppress the uprising. However, just as Feng had completed gathering and training the militia, he suddenly fell ill and died at age 85 while still in military service.

He was posthumously awarded the name "Yongyi" (勇毅) meaning "Brave and Resolute". He is buried near his hometown in Qinzhou.

== Legacy ==
Feng Zicai's former residence, also known as Gongbao Mansion (宫保第) in Baishuitang (白水塘), Qinzhou has been turned into a museum.

Feng Zicai's tomb is located on a small hill near Niqiao village (泥桥村), Shabu town (沙埠镇), 13 kilometers from the old road to Hepu in Qinnan. In 1981, the People's Government of Guangxi Zhuang Autonomous Region designated the tomb as a protected cultural relic of and allocated funds for restoration after robbers stole a stone Leopard statue in 2019.

In 2018, to commemorate the 200th anniversary of Feng Zicai's birth, the "Astragalus nanjiangianus (南疆黄耆), Giant Hands Holding Up the Sky—Feng Zicai Life and Deeds Exhibition" was jointly organized by the Publicity Department of the Guangxi Zhuang Autonomous Region Party Committee, the Department of Culture, and the Qinzhou Municipal Party Committee and Municipal Government.

In 1890, Feng Zicai rebuilt Suifeng Academy, now called Qinzhou No. 1 High School, a full-body portrait of Feng Zicai stands on campus. In September 2010, the public full-day primary school built by the Qinzhou municipal government with an investment of over 19 million yuan was named Qinzhou Zicai Primary School, and the school's Young Pioneers even established the "Zicai Squad."

In 2011, to commemorate Feng Zicai, a 920-meter-long self-anchored suspension bridge was built in Qinzhou city, named the "Zicai Bridge."

The story of Feng Zicai and the victory of the Chinese troops was made into the 2017 film The War of Loong.

== Family ==
Great-grandfather: Feng Suiyun (冯遂云, 1709–1766)
Grandfather: Feng Guangyun (冯广运, 1753–1807)
Father: Feng Wengui (冯文贵, 1786–1827)

Elder Brother: Feng Ziqing (冯子清, January 8, 1813 – 1870)

He had 4 concubines in addition to his wife, bearing a total of 14 sons and 20 daughters.

His 6th son, Feng Xiangzhao (冯相钊), served as magistrate of Hepu during the Qing dynasty and as magistrate of Qinlian during the Republic of China.

His 7th son, Feng Xiangkai (冯相锴), later named Mingkai (铭锴) served as the chief military commissioner of the Qinzhou militia during the Qing dynasty, and in the Republic of China era as major general, commander, Qinlian border defense supervisor, and division commander under Deng Benyin

== See also ==
- Draft History of Qing
- Zhang Guoliang
