= Battle of Jiangnan =

Battle of Jiangnan may refer to:

- Battle of Jiangnan (1856)
- Battle of Jiangnan (1860)
