= Jirhangga =

Governor of Jiangsu
- In office 1854–1856
- Preceded by: Xu Naizhao
- Succeeded by: Zhao Dezhe

Personal details
- Died: June 1, 1856 Zhenjiang, Jiangsu, China
- Occupation: Statesman, general

Military service
- Allegiance: Qing dynasty
- Branch/service: Manchu Bordered Yellow Banner
- Commands: Green Standard Army
- Battles/wars: Taiping Rebellion

Jirhangga (Manchu: ᠵᡳᡵᡥᠠᠩᡤᠠ; Chinese: 吉爾杭阿; also known as Koer-hanger in English; died June 1, 1856) was an eminent Manchu official in the late Qing dynasty. He served as the Governor of Jiangsu, which belonged to Bordered Yellow Banner, and was appointed to that post by Imperial Commissioner Xiang Rong (向榮). He was killed in action by rebels during the Taiping Rebellion.

== Actions against Small Swords Society ==
=== Recovery of Shanghai county ===
Before the Chinese New Year of 1856, Jirhangga and the Mayor of Nanjing led 15,000 troops into Shanghai. This was followed by street fighting, the recovery of the Shanghai county, and the arrest of thousands of Small Swords Society members.

=== Organizing the Corps at Mount Jiuhua ===
In March 1856, Jirhangga and Nanjing's Mayor led 40,000 troops stationed in Mount Jiuhua. The army was intended to capture the capital of the Taiping Rebellion in Nanjing.

== Death ==
In 1856, when the Taiping General Qin Rigang brought forces to strengthen the offensive against Beijing in the North, Jirhangga immediately attacked, despite having only a fraction of the troops, and against the advice of his staff. After five days of fighting, Jirhangga was killed by artillery shells as he was standing on the city wall of the Dantu District city, waving the Qing's banner.

== Aftermath ==
Under orders from Xiang Rong, Zhang Guoliang brought reinforcements from Jiangnan DaYing to save Jirhangga, but arrived too late, as Jirhangga had been killed a week earlier. Zhang Guoliang still recovered the vital city of Zhenjiang from the Taiping, who had occupied it for five years. Jirhangga's death and the five-day combat changed the Taiping rebels' former offensive toward the north.

== See also ==
- Draft History of Qing
