= Bao Chao =

Qing Dynasty politician and general (1828–1886)

Viscount of the First Rank Bao Chao
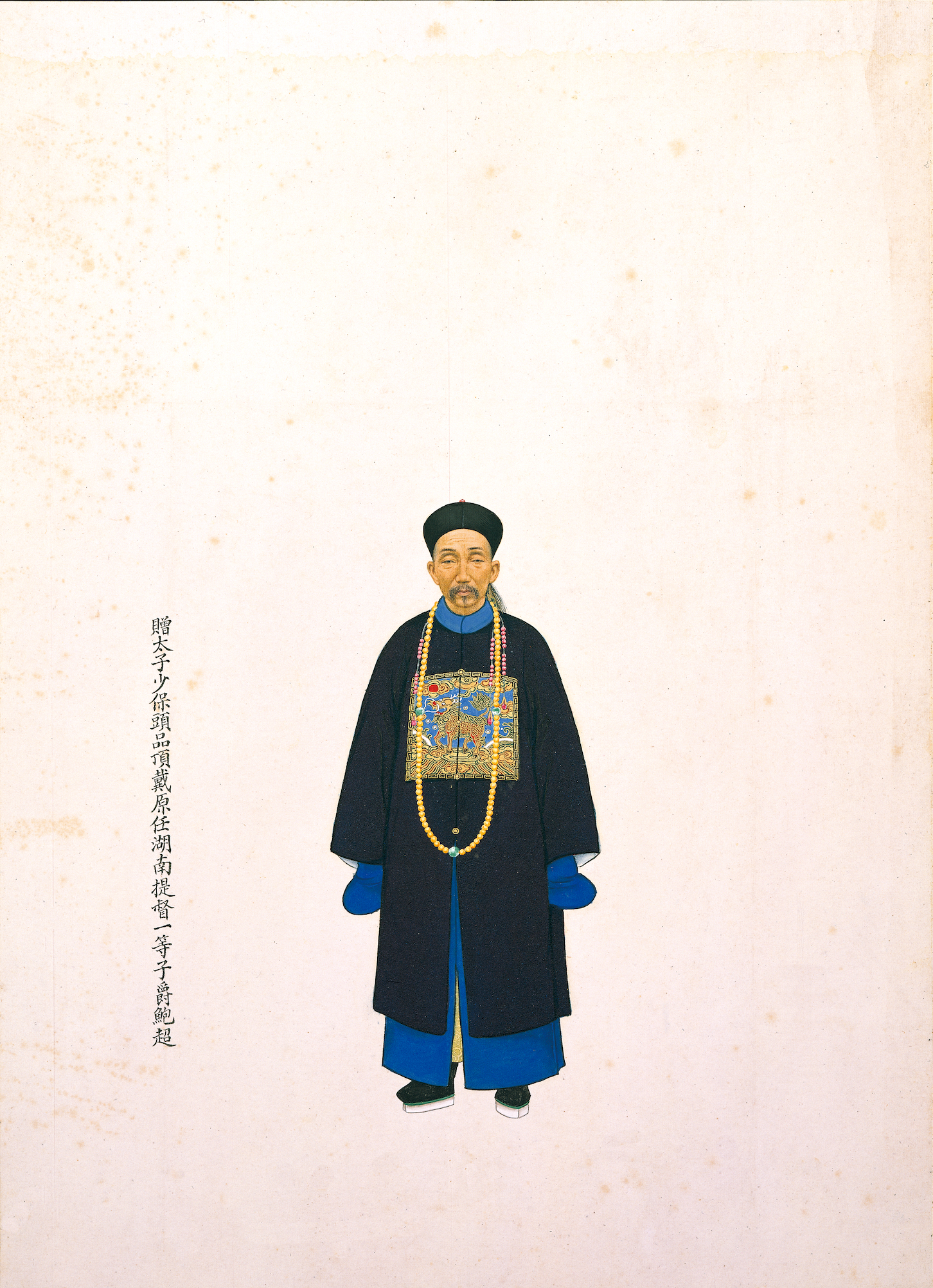
- Portrait
- Born: 1828; Wuxi County, Hubei, China
- Died: 1886 (aged 57–58); Fengjie County, China
- Military career
- Allegiance: (Qing dynasty) Qing Dynasty
- Service years: 1852–1886
- Rank: Field Marshal, 1864
- Unit: Army
- Commands: Commander (霆字營) of the Xiang Army
- Conflicts: Battle of Changzhou, 1863--1864 Battle of inlon river, 1867
- Awards: Imperial yellow jacket(黃馬褂)

Bao Chao (Chinese: 鮑超; Styled Chun Ting 春霆) (1828–1886) was a Han Chinese official, military Captain General, of the late Qing Dynasty in China. He raised the Xiang Army to fight effectively against the Taiping Rebellion and restored the stability of Qing Dynasty along with other prominent figures, including Zuo Zongtang and Zeng Guofan, setting the scene for the era later to fight against known as the "Nien Rebellion". He was known for his military perception.

== Fame and military campaigns ==
- Only a stoker in 1852, he enlisted in the Green Standard Army in Hubei and was transferred to Army Group Jiangnan.
- In spite of victories in 1853 he was widely disliked by other officers, until Zeng Guofan drafted him into the Xiang Army where he would be promoted to a company commander to defend Lake Dongting.
- In the Xiang Army he promoted very fast, and by 1856 he was a major general in command of 15,000 infantry, defending Qimen County (Xiang Army's headquarter position), inflicting numerous defeats on the invading Taiping Army.
- In the course of his career, he had joined combat 500 times and was wounded 108 times on his body.
- By 1863, he was commander of the Zhejiang Military Region (1861 – 1864)
- Retired, from 1867 to 1878
- Returned to command the Hunan Military Region (1882 – 1886)

== Death ==
He was buried in the north of Fengjie County, but he was later seen as a Proletariat betrayer so his grave was destroyed by the Red Guard during the Cultural Revolution.

== Awards ==
- created the royal BATURU (Manchu:the Brave twice in 1855 (and promoted colonel), 1860 (guards Qimen County and saved Zeng Guofan successfully)
- created Imperial yellow jacket (黃馬褂) in 1862
- created Viscount Yiyong of the First Class, Order of succession (勇毅一等子爵, 世襲) in 1864
- Vice Three Excellencies, Crown prince military second master (太子少保)
