= Imperial yellow jacket =

Qing dynasty symbol of honour

Huang magua
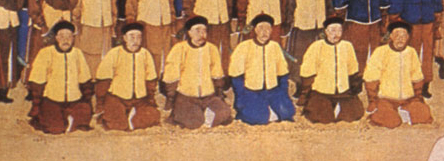

Chinese name
- Traditional Chinese: 黃馬褂
- Simplified Chinese: 黃马褂
- Literal meaning: Yellow horse jacket
Transcriptions
Standard Mandarin
- Hanyu Pinyin: Huáng mǎguà

English name
- English: Imperial yellow jacket

The imperial yellow jacket (Chinese: 黃馬褂; pinyin: Huáng mǎguà) was a symbol of high honour during China's Qing dynasty. As yellow was a forbidden color, representing the Emperor, the jacket was given only to high-ranking officials and to the Emperor's body guards.

== Wearing the jacket ==
A magua (Chinese: 馬褂; lit. 'Riding jacket'; Manchu: ᠣᠯᠪᠣ olbo) is a short-sleeved, loose outer garment of Manchu origin, designed for ease to put on and take off by wearers on horseback.

Although persons not of imperial blood were generally prohibited from wearing yellow-coloured clothing, during the Qing dynasty the yellow riding jackets would be worn by the Imperial body guards, albeit as a livery coat, and then only while escorting the Emperor.

The yellow jacket could also be granted by the Emperor (or later Empress Dowager Cixi) to individuals for civil or military merit, especially after 1839 when China was more or less in a constant state of war. Since yellow clothing was normally reserved for the Imperial family, the yellow jacket came to be regarded as the highest honour of the Qing dynasty.

Towards the end of the Qing dynasty the prestige of the yellow jacket had declined somewhat; in one infamous case, a yellow jacket was granted to a train driver for his service to Empress Dowager Cixi.

== Ceremonies ==
Recipients of the imperial yellow jackets would be joined by provincial governors and senior military officials for annual celebrations. Moreover, many recipients would wear their imperial yellow jackets as their funeral attire, which is roughly equivalent to having the national flag draped on the coffin in modern times.

== People who were awarded the jacket ==
- Giuseppe Castiglione
- Fuk'anggan
- Zeng Guofan
- Zuo Zongtang
- Li Hongzhang
- Cheng Xuechi
- Zeng Guoquan
- Xiang Rong (after he was KIA)
- Zhang Guoliang (in 1857)
- Feng Zicai
- Zhu Hongzhang
- Bao Chao
- Ding Ruchang
- Hu Xueyan
- Charles George Gordon
- Yuan Shikai
- Cen Chunxuan
