= Battle of Jiangnan (1856) =

First rout of the Jiangnan Battalion
Date	Late May, 1856 – early August, 1856 (Determined battle from June 16–20)
Location	Outside Nanjing and Jiangbei (江北), China
Result	Taiping victory
Territorial changes	South eastern China annexed by Taiping Heavenly Kingdom

Belligerents
(Qing dynasty) Qing Dynasty	Taiping Heavenly Kingdom

Commanders and leaders
(Qing dynasty) Xiang Rong † (Qing dynasty) Her Chyun (Qing dynasty) Zhang GuoLiang (Qing dynasty) Jeer Hungar †	Yang Xiuqing; Qin Rigang; Shi Dakai; Li Xiucheng

Strength
80,000 Green Standard Army	460,000 militia forces

Casualties and losses
39,000 killed or wounded	Unknown

The First rout of the Jiangnan Battalion (simplified Chinese: 一破江南大营; traditional Chinese: 一破江南大營) took place between 1853 and 1856 when the Qing government raised the Green Standard Army to fight against the Taiping Heavenly Kingdom. The action involved Qing forces surrounding the city of Nanjing, the capital of the Taiping Heavenly Kingdom.

== First rout of the Jiangnan Army Group ==
After the Taiping Heavenly Kingdom militia successfully occupied Nanjing in the southern territory of Jiangnan, within ten days First Class Senior Gen. Xiang Rong, in command of 10,000 Green Standard Army troops, surrounded the walls of the city. The remnants of the former Qing garrison defending Nanjing were barricaded outside city walls inside the Ming Xiaoling Mausoleum.

Alongside Xiang Rong, the Green Standard Army was led by Second Class Senior Gen. Her Chyun and Lt. Gen. Zhang Guoliang. The leaders of the Taiping forces were Shi Dakai, Yang Xiuqing, Qin Rigang (秦日綱) and Li Xiucheng.

The regular Army numbered 80,000 troops and the Taiping Rebellion militia force had 460,000 men.

=== Outcome ===
On June 1 the Nanjing army tried to stop Taiping forces but Governor of Jiangsu Jeer Hungar (吉爾杭阿), the Mayor of Nanjing and their entire army of 7,800 were totally wiped out, with Jeer Hungar being killed by an artillery bomb.

The Qing army lost another battle later in the month and the remaining 36,000 troops retreated north. On August 9 Xiang Rong committed suicide by hanging himself, although others claimed he had a fatal overdose of opium due to the pain of his battle wounds in Danyang.

== See also ==
- Second Rout of the Jiangnan Battalion
- Second Opium War
