= Baturu =

Military title for bravery in Qing China

Baturu (Manchu: baturu; Chinese: 巴圖魯; pinyin: Bātúlǔ) was an official title of China's Qing dynasty, awarded to commanders and soldiers who fought bravely on the battlefield. In Manchu, baturu means "warrior" or "brave." It is originally from the Turco-Mongol word baγatur, which has the same meaning.

At the beginning of the Qing dynasty, only Manchu and Mongol soldiers were permitted to receive the title. During the reign of the Jiaqing Emperor, Han soldiers started to receive the title. Beginning in the reign of the Xianfeng Emperor, civilians and foreigners were permitted to receive the title as well.

== Recipients ==
- Turusi
- Bao Chao
- Cheng Xueqi
- William Mesny
- Oboi
- Song Qing
- Frederick Townsend Ward
- Xiang Rong
- Zeng Guofan
- Zhang Guoliang
- Dong Fuxiang- "Arhanga-Baturu"(阿爾杭阿巴圖魯)

etc.
