= He Chun =

He Chun or Her Chyun (和春; died 1860) was a Manchu nobleman and military commander of the Qing dynasty. He Chun was a commander of the northern encampment of the Army Group Jiangnan, a unit of the Green Standard Army tasked to defeat the Taiping Rebellion. The northern encampment was based near Yangzhou, before the attack on the Taiping capital, Tianjing (Nanjing). However during the Battle of Jiangnan (1860) he was killed the attack on Nanjing.
