= Jiangnan Daying =

Jiangnan Daying (Chinese: 江南大營) or the Jiangnan Battalion; (first battalion: 1853–1856; second battalion: 1857–1860) was an army group assembled by the Qing dynasty. The army group consist of mostly Green Standard Army, and their goal was to quell the Taiping Rebellion around the Jiangnan region. The army group twice encircled Nanjing, the capital of the Taiping Heavenly Kingdom, but were defeated by the Taiping forces on both occasions.

== First Jiangnan DaYing ==
=== Time ===
1853—1856: when the armies of the Taiping Rebellion occupied Nanjing, after 10 days Xiang Rong in command of a 10,000 strong Green Standard Army tracked them to Taiping and stationed outside the Nanjing wall.

=== Headquarters ===
The headquarters of the Jiangnan DaYing were located in Ming Xiaoling Mausoleum.

=== Leaders ===
Imperial Commissioner: First Class Senior General Xiang Rong (向榮)

Military commander: Second Class Senior General Her Chyun

Lieutenant General: Zhang GuoLiang

=== Taiping Generals ===
Shi Dakai, Yang Xiuqing, Qin Rigang (秦日綱), Li Xiucheng

=== Strength ===
The 80,000 soldiers in the regular Army faced 460,000+ in the Taiping Rebellion militia force.

=== Outcome ===
On June 1, 1856, an army tried to stop the Taiping forces but the Governor of Jiangsu Jeer Hungar (吉爾杭阿), Mayor of Nanjing, lost and his army of 7,800 were all killed.

There was a heated battle from June 16 to June 20, but the Qing army of 80,000 was defeated and the surviving 36,000 followers of Xiang Rong retreated north. On August 9, Xiang Rong committed suicide in Danyang, but this strategy stopped the forces' march north.

== Second Jiangnan DaYing ==
=== Time ===
1858–1860

=== Leaders ===
Imperial Commissioner: First Class Senior General Her Chyun

Viceroy of Liangjiang: He Guiqing (何桂清) (escaped to Shanghai and was executed by Qing)

Military commander: Second Class Senior General Zhang GuoLiang (KIA early May 1860)

Governor of Zhejiang province 1st Luo Zundian (羅遵殿) (died early March 1860, forced suicide)

Governor of Zhejiang province 2nd Wang Youling (王有齡) (died early October 1861, forced suicide)

Governor of Jiangsu province Xu Youren (徐有壬) (KIA December 21, 1860)

Lieutenant General: Zhang YuLiang (張玉良) (KIA October 1861)

Lieutenant General: Zhou Tengso (周天受) (KIA middle of May 1860)

Lieutenant General: Wang Jung (王浚) (KIA late April 1860)

=== Victory of Taiping Generals ===
Li Xiucheng, Lai Wenguang, Tong Zonghai (童容海), Chen Yucheng, Yang Fuqing (楊輔清), Li Shixian, Liu Qeuling (劉瑲琳)

=== Strength ===
The regular Army had only 180,000 soldiers while the Taiping Rebellion militia force had at least 560,000 soldiers.

=== Outcome ===
Taiping Rebellion forces occupied Jiangsu in 1860. The next year, they occupied Zhejiang. The Jiangnan DaYing was destroyed. The Second Opium War took place and the Xianfeng Emperor died in 1861. The Xiang Army and Huai Army combined to become the Green Standard Army in 1862 and for the third time they surrounded and attacked Nanjing, successfully ending the civil war in July 1864.

== Commentary ==
The Jiangnan DaYing had trouble making payroll for its forces, and these forces were insufficient to fight against the British and French forces in northern China during the Second Opium War.

The leaders intrigued against each other: Xiang Rong (向榮) and Her Chyun in the first Jiangnan DaYing Her Chyun group, and the He Guiqing and Zeng Guofan groups disputed inner officials' system, which allowed the Taiping Rebellion to gain momentum.

Her Chyun could use the Brigadier General's works but he belittled the Taiping Rebellion, He Guiqing's cowardice and Zeng Guofan's selfishness, which were the three reasons for their loss.

== See also ==
- Battle of Nanking
- Second rout the Army Group Jiangnan
- Second Opium War
