= Xiang Rong =

Chinese military general and politician

- Born: 1810; Wuxi County, Chongqing, China
- Died: 9 August 1856 (aged 45–46); Danyang, China
- Military career
- Allegiance: Qing dynasty
- Service years: 1830–1856
- Rank: Field Marshal (1854)
- Unit: Army group
- Commands: Chief commander of the Jiangnan Battalion
- Conflicts: First rout the Army Group Jiangnan (1853–1856)
- Awards: created the royal BATURU (Manchu：the Brave) in 1853 created Imperial yellow jacket (黃馬褂) in 1857 buried in the Nanjing Pantheon.

Xiang Rong (Chinese: 向榮; 1801 – 9 August 1856) was a Chinese military general and politician. He was born in Wuxi County, Chongqing, and was promoted from the rank of a foot soldier during the later years of the Qing dynasty (1644–1912). He was involved in early military operations against the Taiping Rebellion in Henan from 1850 onwards, cooperating with the Imperial Commissioner, Qishan. From then he was a Senior Colonel, after one year the military promoted him be the tidu (提督) of Guangxi, even though he failed, he made the Taiping believers flee Guangxi.

Continuing after Guangxi, Xiang Rong never gave up and tracked the Taiping rebels across three province to Jiangnan in southern China. His Jiangnan Battalion (part of the Green Standard Army) was constantly defeated by the Taiping rebel army outside Nanjing. The Taiping rebel army broke through his various encirclements and occupied Wuhan and Nanjing, giving rise to a huge civil war.

== Death ==
He and his vice commander Zhang Guoliang commanded a 90,000 man force together from April 1853.

In 1856, Xiang Rong's army fought against Qin Rigang for one month and was defeated by Qin Rigang's militia, Xiang Rong was wounded and died after several days in Danyang City.
