= Deng Benyin =

Chinese warlord and general (born 1879)

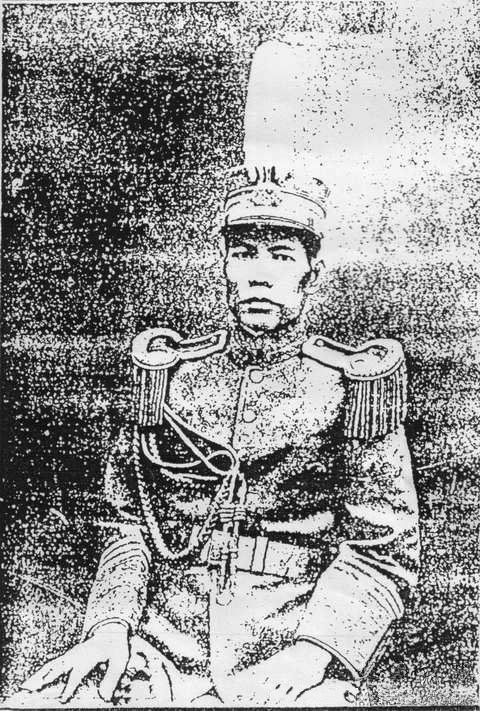
- Deng c. 1920s
- Native name: 鄧本殷
- Born: 27 August 1879; Fangcheng County, Guangdong, Qing China (now Fangchenggang, Guangxi)
- Died: after 1949 or 1966 possibly British Hong Kong
- Allegiance: Qing dynasty; Empire of China; Republic of China
- Service years: 1899–1926; 1938–c. 1940
- Rank: General
- Conflicts: National Protection War; Second Sino-Japanese War

Deng Benyin (traditional Chinese: 鄧本殷; simplified Chinese: 邓本殷; Wade–Giles: Teng Pen-yin; 27 August 1879 – after 1949 or 1966) was a general and warlord of the Republic of China during the Warlord Era. He was a member of the Guangdong Army and governed Hainan during the 1920s. During the Second Sino-Japanese War, he organized guerilla forces in Jiangsu and Zhejiang.

== Career ==
Deng joined the local army in Fangcheng in 1899. He became a subordinate of Long Jiguang after the Xinhai Revolution. Long occupied Guangzhou and became governor of Guangdong in 1913. In late 1915, Yuan Shikai declared himself Emperor of China. Long, a supporter of Yuan, found himself opposed by the anti-imperial Yunnan and Guangxi cliques, and Deng was sent to suppress these forces.

In October 1916, Guangxi warlord Lu Rongting ousted Long Jiguang as governor of Guangdong. Deng's command was reorganized under governor Zhu Qinglan's command, but Deng had a poor relationship with the Old Guangxi clique and was later placed under Chen Jiongming's command as a commander in the Fujian-Guangdong Army. In 1920 Deng occupied parts of southern Guangdong and Hainan and became the commander of the 4th Independent Brigade of the Guangdong Army. Deng supported Chen's revolt against Sun Yat-sen in 1922, but left Chen after the revolt was defeated and Chen was expelled from Guangdong. Deng then left for Hainan, where he opposed the Kuomintang and supported the Beiyang government.

In 1925 Deng established the South Kwongtong Industrial Bank, Hainan's first modern bank and first bank to issue paper banknotes. However, it was closed after the Kuomintang occupied Hainan in 1926.

Deng planned to take advantage of the instability within the Kuomintang government in Guangzhou after Liao Zhongkai was assassinated in August 1925. He allied with Chen Jiongming to attack Guangzhou, but they were defeated, and Deng fled back to Hainan. In 1926, National Revolutionary Army forces led by Chen Jitang and Zhang Fakui landed in Hainan. Deng was defeated and fled to Shanghai, where he lived in seclusion.

During the Second Sino-Japanese War, Deng came of out retirement to organize an anti-Japanese guerrilla force in the Zhejiang-Jiangsu area. These guerrillas focused on targeting the Collaborationist Chinese Army, and were later incorporated into the Communist New Fourth Army after Deng resigned as commander.

== Later life ==
In 1949, Deng accepted Li Jishen's request to prepare the Shanghai branch of the Revolutionary Committee of the Chinese Kuomintang for the upcoming Communist regime. However, he later fled to British Hong Kong before the establishment of the People's Republic of China.

The rest of Deng's life is unknown. Some sources claimed that he was still living in British Hong Kong during the Cultural Revolution in Mainland China.
