= Luo Zundian =

Chinese politician

Luo Zundian (Chinese: 羅遵殿; died March 19, 1860), courtesy name Dancun (澹村), art name Wenyun (問雲), posthumous name Zhuangjie (壯節), was a Chinese official of the Qing dynasty. He is notable for ending several rebellions against the Qing government, but was forced to commit suicide in the second rout of the Jiangnan Battalion in Hangzhou when the forces of the Taiping Heavenly Kingdom conquered the city.

== Life ==
Luo was born in Susong County, Anhui. From very early in life, he showed remarkable ability, and he became a shengyuan in the imperial examination system. In 1835, he obtained jinshi degree, the highest level in the Imperial examination system. Shortly after this the central provinces of the empire were invaded by the Taiping rebels, and he raised a regiment of militia.
