= Zhang Guoliang =

19th-century Chinese field marshal

- Born: 1810; Gaoyao, Zhaoqing, Guangdong, China
- Died: April 1860 (aged 49–50); Danyang, Jiangsu, China
- Military career
- Allegiance: (Qing dynasty) Qing Dynasty
- Service years: 1849–1861
- Rank: Major, 1849; Lieutenant General, 1853; Captain General (湖南提督), 1855; Field Marshal (江南提督), 1857
- Nickname: Big head sheep
- Unit: Army group
- Commands: Jiangnan DaYing
- Conflicts: First rout the Army Group Jiangnan (1853–1856); Second rout the Army Group Jiangnan (1857–1860)
- Awards: royal BATURU (Manchu: the Brave) in 1853; Imperial yellow jacket (黃馬褂) in 1857; Baron Yiyong of the First Class, Order of succession (勇毅一等男爵, 世襲)

Zhang Guoliang (traditional Chinese: 張國樑; simplified Chinese: 张国梁; pinyin: Zhāng Guóliáng; 1810 – April 1860), born in Guangdong, was a Field Marshal for the Qing dynasty. He was born in Gaoyao, Zhaoqing, Guangdong, although Qing stated that he was from Meixian, Guangdong. He was originally a bandit in Guangxi but later joined the Qing Army. He helped to raise the Green Standard Army to 250,000 to fight against the Taiping Rebellion. In the second rout of Army Group Jiangnan in 1860 he was defeated by Li Xiucheng. Zeng Guofan praised Zhang and said he was Jiangnan's "Great Wall of China."

== Life ==
When the Battle of Nanjing (1853) began, Zhang accepted a SOS order from Nanjing, he and his 15,000 men were the first troops to arrive and save Nanjing. In 1856, Zhang Guoliang led his army in the recovery of Zhenjiang, which had been occupied by Taiping for five years. The Emperor rewarded Zhang with the Imperial yellow jacket and promoted him to First Class Senior General. In April 1860, Zhang was defeated and led his remaining 20,000 soldiers in retreat to Danyang. He left the city on horseback and drowned while trying to escape. His body was not found immediately; it was eventually buried in the Nanjing Pantheon.

== Awards ==
- Baturu in 1853
- Imperial yellow jacket in 1857
- Baron Yiyong of the First Class
