= Battle of Jiangnan (1860) =

Failed expedition into Tianjing

Second rout of the Jiangnan Battalion
- Part of the Taiping Rebellion (Eastern Expedition)
Date	10 February – 15 May 1860
Location	Nanjing and vicinity
Result	Taiping victory

Belligerents
Qing dynasty: Green Standard Army; Army Group Jiangnan	Taiping Heavenly Kingdom

Commanders and leaders
(Qing dynasty) Chief Commander Zhang Guoliang † (Qing dynasty) Imperial Commissioner (Qing dynasty) He Chun † (Qing dynasty) General Zhang Youliang (Qing dynasty) Luo Zundian	Chief Commander Li Xiucheng; Vice Chief Commander Chen Yucheng; Yang Fuqing; Lai Wenguang; Tong Zonghai; Li Shixian; Hong Rengan

Strength
180,000 men	360,000 men

Casualties and losses
140,000 total: ~40,000 KIA; 100,000 POW	8,000 KIA

The Battle of Jiangnan, also known as the Second Rout of the Jiangnan Battalion (Chinese: 太平軍二破江南大營) took place in 1860 between the Qing dynasty's Green Standard Army and the army of the Taiping Heavenly Kingdom during the Taiping Rebellion. The Green Standard Army twice attempted to besiege Nanjing, capital of the Taiping Heavenly Kingdom, but was unable to break through. To break the siege of Nanjing, the Taiping forces maneuvered to divert Qing forces by sacking Hangzhou, before quickly moving back to Nanjing to counter-encircle the Qing siege forces and routing the Green Standard Army garrison completely, breaking the siege of Nanjing.

== Jiangnan ==
The eastern campaign began in 9 February. Gen. Li Xiucheng of the rebel forces encircled the region of Jiangnan. They approached the Zhejiang provincial capital, Hangzhou, disguised as Qing troops. At Hangzhou, the 60,000 Taiping troops were outnumbered by Qing defenders, so they used several deception tricks such as placing hundreds of flags on a hill giving the impression of large numbers. The city walls were destroyed with explosives on 19 March, and the city was taken soon after. The Mayor of Hangzhou committed suicide after the loss.

Li's daring act attracted the attention of Zhang Guoliang, who ordered Gen. Tidu Zhang Youliang (張玉良), in command of 36,000 troops, to track Li's corps. Li routed Zhang's troops and crippled Army Group Jiangnan. When Zhang Youliang arrived in Hangzhou he believed that Li was occupying the city, but Li's corps had left two days earlier on 19 March and attacked another city while waiting for reinforcements.

In Nanjing Hong Rengan ordered Chen Yucheng's troops to cross the river. Chen commanded over 100,000 men along the river and on 29 April he received the signal to attack from Hong Rengan and began the crossing.

== Zeng Guofan ==
When Chief commander Zhang Guoliang and Imperial Commissioner He Chun died the Qing government promoted Zeng Guofan. This changed the course of the war in favor of the Qing and their western allies.

== See also ==
- First Rout of the Jiangnan Battalion
- Jiangnan Battalion
- Second Opium War
- Draft History of Qing
