= Green Standard Army =

Qing dynasty military and police force

- Active: 1644–1912
- Country: China
- Allegiance: Qing dynasty
- Branch: Army
- Type: Infantry; Cavalry; Artillery; Paramilitary police
- Size: Approximately 500,000
- Engagements: Transition from Ming to Qing; Ten Great Campaigns; White Lotus Rebellion; Taiping Rebellion; Sino-Burmese War

The Green Standard Army (Chinese: 綠營兵; pinyin: Lǜyíngbīng; Manchu: niowanggiyan turun i kūwaran) was a category of military units under the control of China's Qing dynasty. It was made up mostly of ethnic Han soldiers and operated concurrently with the Manchu–Mongol–Han Eight Banner armies. In areas with a high concentration of Hui people, Muslims served as soldiers in the Green Standard Army. After the Qing consolidated control over China, the Green Standard Army was primarily used as a police force.

Despite its name, by the 19th century the Green Standard Army mostly served as paramilitary police force rather than as an army. After the formation of "brave battalions" in response to the mid-19th century rebellions in China, who were mercenaries hired and financed by provincial governors, the Green Standard were relegated for local security only, while the braves became the Qing dynasty's rapid response force. There was an effort starting in the 1860s to modernize Green Standard units to make them similar to the braves, and the Late Qing reforms in the early 1900s began the process of disbanding the worst Green Standard forces while integrating the rest into the New Army. This process was not completed before the 1911 Revolution against the Qing dynasty and the Green Standard were being used as reservists for the New Army.

== History ==
=== Origins ===
The original Green Standard troops were the soldiers of the Ming commanders who surrendered to the Qing in 1644 and after. Their troops enlisted voluntarily and for long terms of service; they usually came from the socially disadvantaged, and remained segregated from Chinese society, partly because of the latter's deep anti-military bias during the late Ming period, and partly because they were paid too poorly and irregularly to marry and support a family.

The Qing relied on the Green Standard soldiers, comprising defected Han Ming military forces who joined the Qing, in order to help rule northern China. It was Green Standard Han troops who actively military governed China locally while Han Bannermen, Mongol Bannermen, and Manchu Bannermen were only brought into emergency situations when there was sustained military resistance.

=== Koxinga and the Revolt of the Three Feudatories ===
The Manchus sent Han Chinese Bannermen to fight against Ming loyalists in Guangdong, Zhejiang and Fujian. The Qing carried out a massive depopulation policy and clearances, forcing people to evacuate the coast in order to deprive Koxinga's Ming loyalists of resources, leading to a myth that it was because Manchus were "afraid of water". In parts of Southern Fujian, northern Han Bannermen fought for the Qing and, in so doing, disproved the claim that the earlier coastal evacuation, which especially affected the ethnic Tanka people, was ordered by the Manchus out of fear of the water.

At the outset of the Revolt of the Three Feudatories (1673–81), four hundred thousand Green Standard Army soldiers were deployed by the Manchus/Qing against the Three Feudatories, in addition to 200,000 Bannermen. However, during 1673 and 1674, the Qing forces were soundly defeated by the forces of the rebel Wu Sangui. The Qing had the support of the majority of Han Chinese soldiers and the Han elite against the Three Feudatories and they refused to join Wu Sangui in the revolt, but the Eight Banners and Manchu officers fared poorly against Wu's forces, so the Qing responded with a massive army of more than 900,000 non-Banner Han Chinese, instead of the Eight Banners, to subdue the rebels. Wu Sangui's forces were crushed by the Green Standard Army, which was made up of defected Ming soldiers.

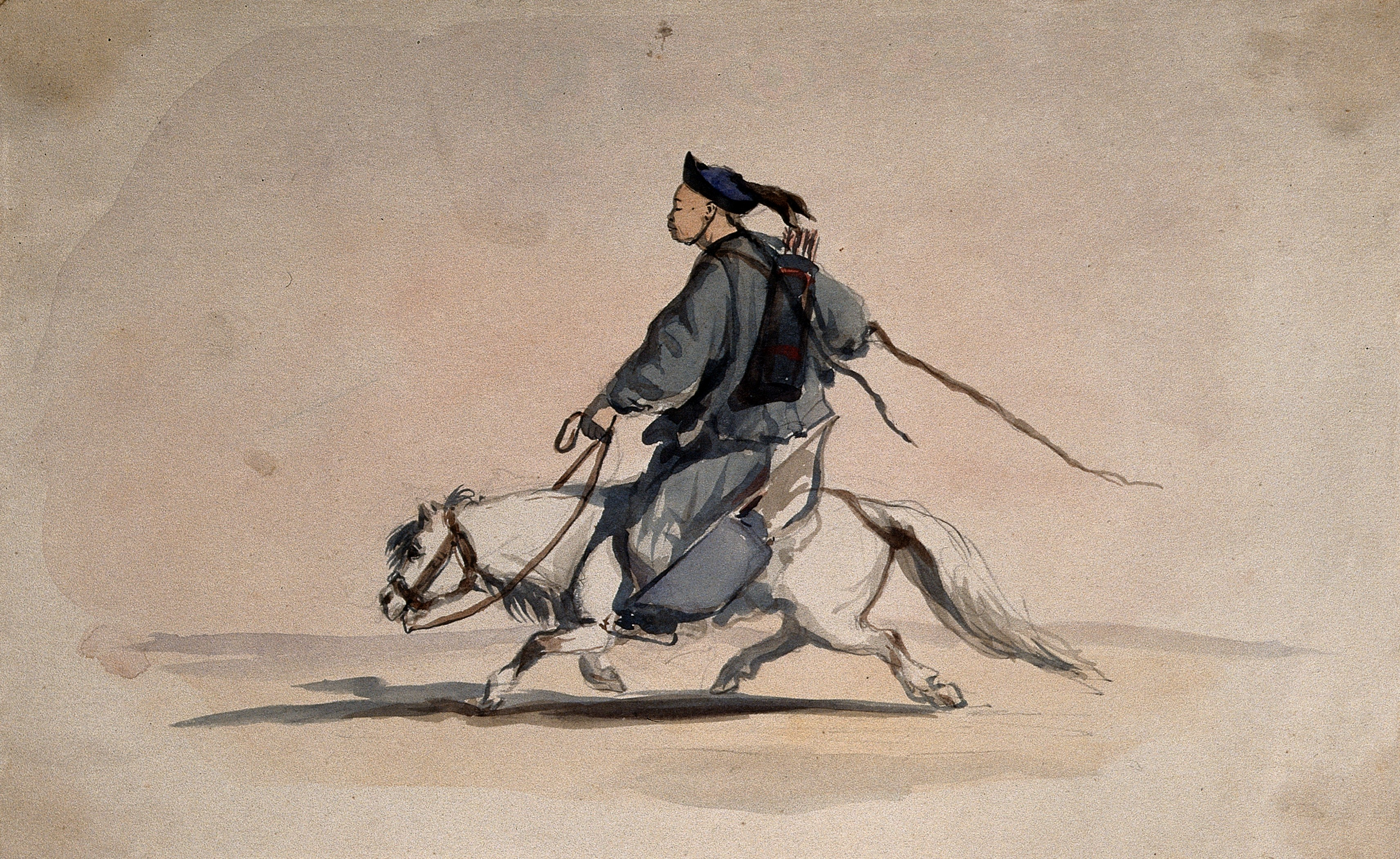
A Green Standard Army horse archer

During the Revolt of the Three Feudatories, Manchu Generals and Bannermen were initially put to shame by the better performance of the Han Chinese Green Standard Army, which was noted by the Kangxi Emperor, leading him to task generals Sun Sike, Wang Jinbao, and Zhao Liangdong with leading Green Standard Soldiers to put down the rebellion. The Qing considered the Han Chinese to be superior fighters, so used the Green Standard Army, rather than Bannermen, as the main force in defeating the rebels.

Against Wang Fuchen in north-western China, the Qing put Bannermen in the rear as reserves. They used Han Chinese Green Standard Army soldiers and Han Chinese generals, such as Zhang Liangdong, Wang Jinbao, and Zhang Yong, as the primary military forces, and they achieved victory over the rebels. Sichuan and southern Shaanxi were retaken in 1680 by the Han Chinese Green Standard Army under Wang Jinbao and Zhao Liangdong, with Manchus only dealing with logistics and provisions. Four hundred thousand Green Standard Army soldiers and 150,000 Bannermen served on the Qing side during the war. Two hundred and thirteen Han Chinese Banner companies, and 527 companies of Mongol and Manchu Banners were mobilized by the Qing during the revolt.

=== Reform and decline ===
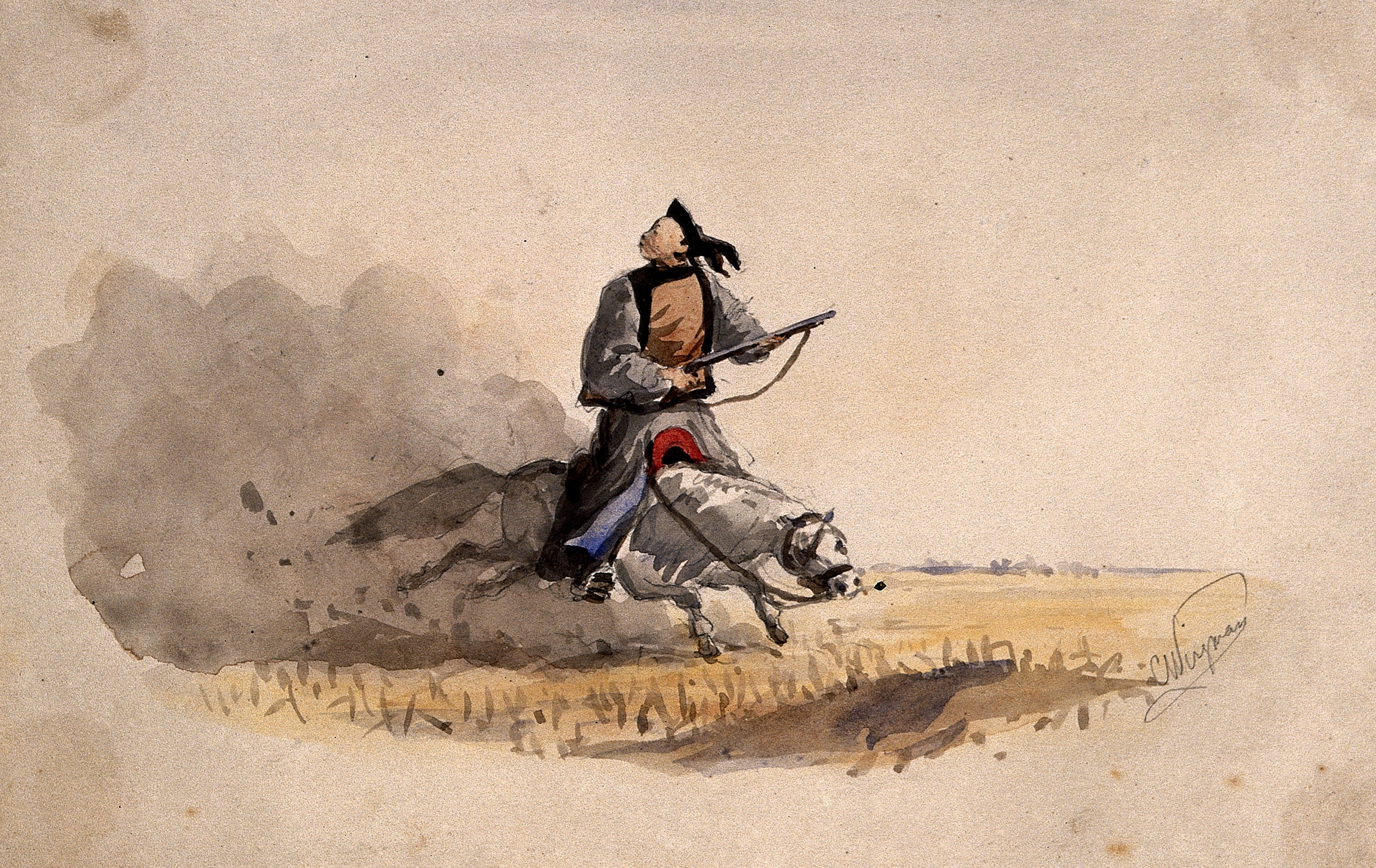
A Green Standard Army cavalryman

Reform of the Qing military system by the Kangxi Emperor during the last years of the War of the Three Feudatories led to a fundamental division of military administration and function between two branches of the Qing Army. The Eight Banners of the old Banner system were retained as a guard force for the dynasty, but Chinese and Mongol troops were progressively transferred out during the 18th century, until most Banner troops were once again ethnic Manchus.

The Qing divided the command structure of the Green Standard Army in the provinces between the high-ranking officers and low-ranking officers. The best and strongest unit was under the control of the highest-ranking officers but, at the same time, those units were outnumbered by other units, which were divided between various lower-ranking officers, so that none of them could initiate a revolt on their own against the Qing because they did not control the entire armies.

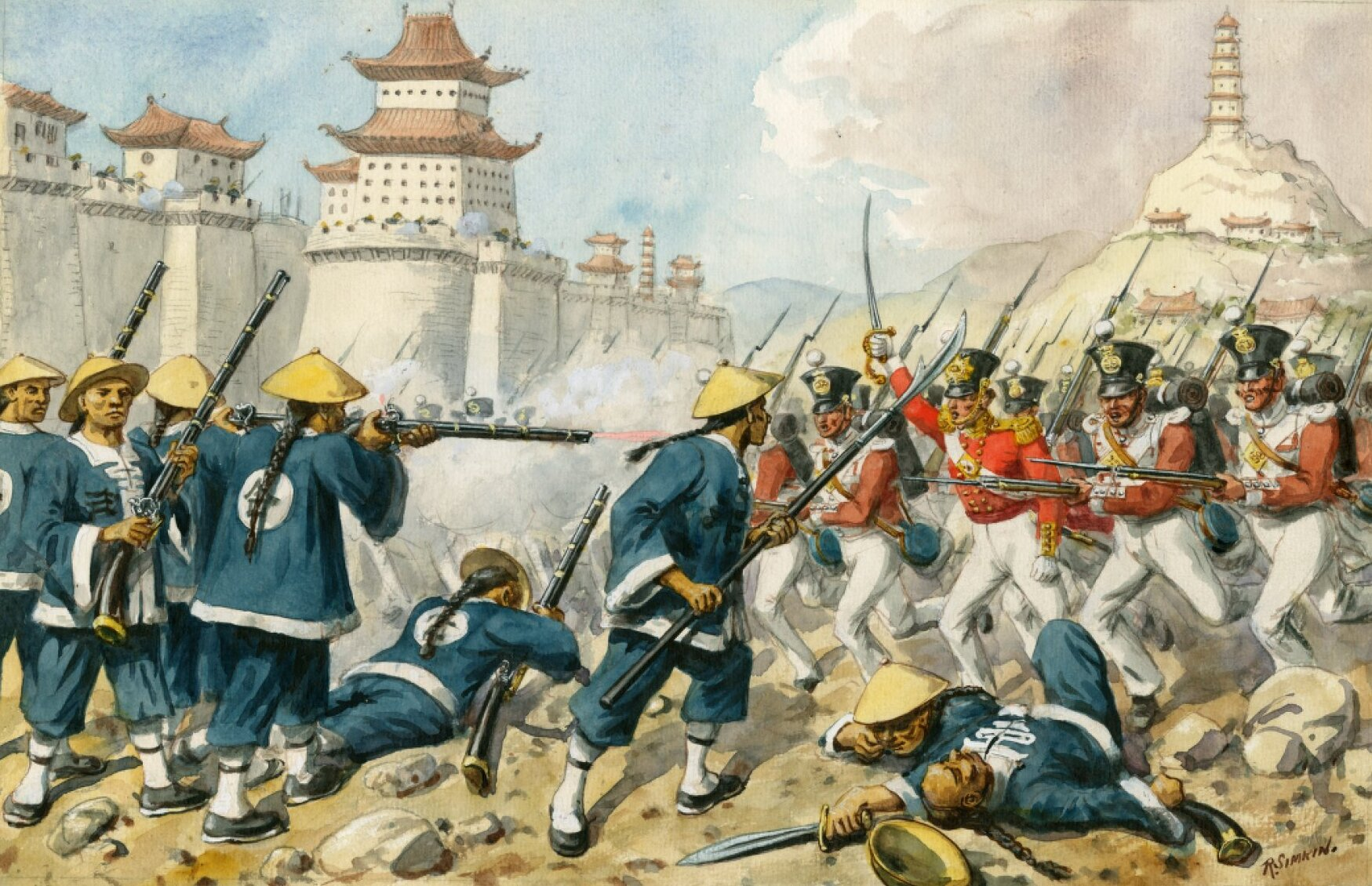
Green Standard Army musketeers (left) at the Battle of Chinkiang

From the 18th century onwards, the Green Standard Army served primarily as a gendarmerie or constabulary, employed to maintain local law and order and quell small-scale disturbances. It also contributed the bulk of forces dispatched in major campaigns. The Green Standard Army was extremely fragmented, with thousands of large and small outposts throughout the empire, many with as few as twelve men. It was divided into garrisons of battalion size, reporting through regional brigade generals to commanders-in-chief (提督; Tídū) in each province. Governors and governors-general each had a battalion of Green Standard troops under their personal command, but their primary duties lay in the judicial and revenue areas rather than coping with invasion or rebellion. During peacetime, it was rare for one officer to command more than 5,000 men.

Strictly speaking, the Green Standard Army was not a hereditary force, although the dynasty directed its recruiting efforts primarily at sons and other relatives of serving soldiers. Enlistment was considered a lifetime occupation, but it was generally very simple to obtain a discharge and be reclassified as a civilian.

A system of rotation was used for Green Standard troops in frontier areas. In Kashgaria, troops of the Green Standard from Shaanxi and Gansu had to serve for three-year tours of duty, later increased to five years, then returned home.

As early as the White Lotus Rebellion of 1794–1804, the Green Standard armies had begun to exhibit a decline in military effectiveness that rendered them utterly ineffective in combating rebels. At least eight factors contributed to this decline: (1) soldiers' pay did not rise with inflation, requiring most to seek outside employment to support their families; (2) wide dispersion of posts prevented centralized training while the armies' policing and civic responsibilities left little time for drilling; (3) wartime forces were created by taking small numbers of soldiers from numerous existing units rather than using existing units, breaking up unit cohesion and leading to "divisive influence, poor coordination, and operative inefficiency"; (4) vacancies in the armies' ranks were either left unfilled so officers could pocket the missing soldiers' allowances or fill positions with personal proteges; (5) rampant gambling and opium addictions; (6) the practice of allowing soldiers to hire substitutes, often beggars, to train and fight in their place; (7) infrequent drilling; (8) lax discipline due to a lack of respect for inept officers often appointed due to favoritism or nepotism.

Ma Zhan'ao, a former Muslim rebel, defected to the Qing side during the Dungan Revolt (1862–77) and his Muslim forces were then recruited into the Green Standard Army of the Qing military after the war ended.

The Qing dynasty tried to reform its armed forces into a modern, European-style national army after the First Sino-Japanese War (1894–1895) and the Boxer Rebellion (1900). The Green Standard Army was completely restructured. In 1907, the Commission on Army Reorganization recommended that the worst of the Green Standard troops be discharged, with the rest reorganized into provincial "Patrol and Defence Forces", to serve as a gendarmerie in peacetime and a reserve for the regular forces during war. About 20 to 30 per cent of the Green Standard units were slated to be dissolved. By the time of the 1911 Xinhai Revolution, the reform of those units was still in progress, but Patrol and Defence Forces had been established in almost every province.

== Sources ==
- Mayers, William Frederick. The Chinese Government: A Manual of Chinese Titles, Categorically Arranged and Explained, with an Appendix. 3rd edition revised by G.M.H. Playfair ed. Shanghai: Kelly & Walsh, 1897; reprint, Taipei: Ch'eng-Wen Pub. Co., 1966.
- McCord, Edward A. (1993). The Power of the Gun: The Emergence of Modern Chinese Warlordism. Berkeley: University of California Press. ISBN 978-0-520-08128-4.
- Paine, S.C.M (2003). The Sino-Japanese War of 1894–1895: Perceptions, Power, and Primacy. Cambridge University Press. ISBN 978-0-521-81714-1.

== See also ==
- Nine Gates Infantry Commander
