= God Worshipping Society =

19th-century Chinese religious movement which began the Taiping Rebellion

God Worshipping Society
- 拜上帝會
- Classification: Nontrinitarian Christianity
- Orientation: Restorationist (Protestant-influenced)
- Scripture: Taiping Bible
- Theology: Nontrinitarian "Lord Above" (Shangdi) theology, millenarianism
- Region: China
- Language: Chinese
- Founder: Hong Xiuquan
- Origin: 1843; Guangdong, Qing dynasty
- Defunct: 1864

Bai Shangdi Hui
- Traditional Chinese: 拜上帝會
- Simplified Chinese: 拜上帝会
- Literal meaning: Prostrate before high emperor group
Transcriptions
Standard Mandarin
- Hanyu Pinyin: Bài Shàngdì Huì
- Bopomofo: ㄅㄞˋ ㄕㄤˋ ㄉㄧˋ ㄏㄨㄟˋ
- Wade–Giles: Pai^{4} Shang^{4}-ti^{4} Hui^{4}
- Tongyong Pinyin: Bài Shàng-dì Huèi
- IPA: [pâɪ ʂâŋ.tî xwêɪ]

The God Worshipping Society (simplified Chinese: 拜上帝会; traditional Chinese: 拜上帝會; pinyin: Bài Shàngdì Huì) (Note: In some translations, the name appears as the Supreme Emperor Worshipping Society because "Shang Di" is the pinyin romanization of two Chinese characters: the first – 上, Shàng – means "high", "highest", "first", "primordial"; the second – 帝, Dì – is typically considered as shorthand for huangdi (皇帝) in modern Chinese, the title of the emperors of China first employed by Qin Shi Huang, and is usually translated as "emperor".) was a nontrinitarian movement that claimed to restore faith in the theology of Shangdi influenced by Protestant Christian missionary activity, originating in the 19th century and incorporating elements of Chinese folk religion and Buddhism. It held God as the supreme deity, with Jesus as his eldest son and Hong Xiuquan, the movement's founder, as his second eldest son. Hong's first contact with Christian pamphlets occurred in 1836 when he directly received American Congregationalist missionary Edwin Stevens' personal copy of the Good Words to Admonish the Age (by Liang Fa, 1832). He only briefly looked over and did not carefully examine it.

Subsequently, Hong claimed to have experienced mystical visions in the wake of his third failure (Note: The imperial examinations had a pass rate of less than one per cent.) of the imperial examinations in 1837 and after failing for a fourth time in 1843, he sat down to carefully examine the tracts with his distant cousin Feng Yunshan, believing that they were "the key to interpreting his visions" coming to the conclusion that he was "the son of God the Father, Shangdi, and was the younger brother of Jesus Christ who had been directed to rid the world of demon worship (Qing dynasty)."

== Beliefs ==
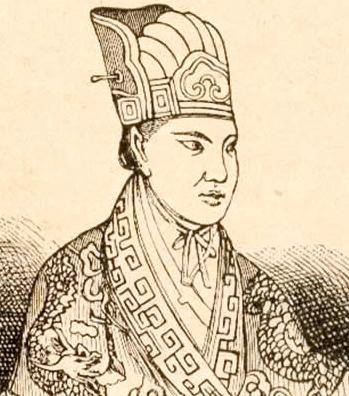
Alleged (Note: According to P. Richard Bohr, this is a Woodblock print of an unidentified Taiping leader.) drawing of Hong Xiuquan, dating from around the early 1850s

The God Worshipping Society believed in divine filiation, the scriptural concept that all Christian believers become sons and daughters of God when redeemed by Christ. Hong Xiuquan did not claim to have a supernatural birth; Hong Xiuquan was merely regarded as the second eldest son of Shangdi after Jesus Christ, with Feng Yunshan as third eldest son, and Yang Xiuqing the fourth eldest. Wei Changhui was recognized as fifth brother of Jesus, Xiao Chaogui as their sixth brother, Shi Dakai as their seventh brother, It is said that Xiao Chaogui was the Heavenly Father's fifth son and also the 'Imperial Son-in-law' (son-in-law of the August God). Xiao Chaogui's wife, Hong Xuanjiao (also known as Yang Xuanjiao), imitated Hong Xiuquan's 'Ding You Dream' and fabricated an almost identical mythical story. She claimed that in the Ding You year, she had suffered a severe illness and was bedridden, feeling as if she were about to die. Her soul ascended to heaven, where she heard an old man say to her, 'Ten years from now, a person will come from the East to teach you how to worship God, and you should sincerely obey.' She claimed that this confirmed her identity as the Heavenly Father's daughter, but she did not claim to be the Heavenly Father's sixth daughter. Different documents mention different orderings of the so-called sons of the Heavenly Father. Some historians believe that the claims about Xiao Chaogui, Wei Changhui, and Shi Dakai being sons of the Heavenly Father and their order are later fabrications and Hong's son was called the nephew of Jesus. Hong Xiuquan's writings expressed rejection of the divinity of Jesus, for example, denying that Jesus performed miracle healing on his own, but rather that it was God who performed them; also commenting on Romans 9, Hong wrote that "Christ is God's Heir Apparent ... [but] is not God" and regarding Mark 12, he wrote that Christ could not be God because "there would be two Gods".

He did however believe that Jesus was an actual son of God, not a mere human messenger. Hong depicted God like traditional Chinese folk deities as an old man with golden beard, wearing a black dragon robe, and having a wife, namely the Heavenly Mother, and multiple consorts. When annotating Chapter 12 of the Book of Revelation, Hong Xiuquan interpreted the "woman" mentioned in Revelation as the Heavenly Father's wife, the "Heavenly Mother" in the God Worshipping Society's doctrine. He also claimed that he and Jesus were born of the Heavenly Mother. He further stated that other "Mothers" gave birth to other children, such as Feng Yunshan. The God Worshipping Society also believed that the Heavenly Elder Brother, Jesus, had a wife, namely the Heavenly Sister-in-law. Hong Xiuquan, in his annotations of the Book of Revelation, mentioned "the Lamb's wife, who is the Heavenly Sister-in-law," and believed that He had multiple children He claimed that God's children included Jesus, himself and a host of little sisters in heaven, and that Jesus, Yang Xiuqing, and himself were born from God before heaven and earth existed. Hong's depiction of God and his intimate heavenly family is likely to have been based on his interpretation of how "Shangdi created humankind in his image". Hong also insisted that only God and Jesus could be described as sheng (holy), warning his followers not to use this term for himself; he also insisted that his own title had to be written in an inferior position to Jesus the Tàizǐ tiānxiōng ("Heavenly Prince-Brother", 太子天兄), which was in turn to be written beneath Tiān fù huáng shàngdì ("God the Heavenly Father-Emperor", 天父皇上帝).

== Formation ==
Beginning with Robert Morrison in 1807, Protestant missionaries began working from Macao, Pazhou (known at the time as Whampoa), and Guangzhou (Canton). Their household staff and the printers they employed for Morrison's dictionary and translation of the Bible—men like Cai Gao, Liang Afa, and Qu Ya'ang—were their first converts and suffered greatly, being repeatedly arrested, fined, and driven into exile at Malacca. However, they corrected and adapted the missionaries' message to reach the Chinese, printing thousands of tracts of their own devising. Unlike the westerners, they were able to travel through the interior of the country and began to particularly frequent the prefectural and provincial examinations, where local scholars competed for the chance to rise to power in the imperial civil service. One of the native tracts, Liang's nine-part, 500-page tome, Good Words to Admonish the Age, found its way into the hands of Hong Xiuquan in the mid-1830s, although it remains a matter of debate during which exact examination this occurred. Hong initially leafed through it without interest.

Feng Yunshan formed the God Worshipping Society in Guangxi after a missionary journey there in 1844 to spread Hong's ideas. In 1847, Hong became the leader of the secret society. The Taiping faith, inspired by missionary Christianity, says one historian, "developed into a dynamic new Chinese religion... Taiping Christianity". Hong presented this religion as a revival and a restoration of the ancient classical faith in Shangdi, a faith that had been displaced by Confucianism (its corrupted version, used by the Qing to submit the Han) and dynastic imperial regimes. The next year, Hong and Feng Yunshan, Hong's distant cousin and one of the earliest converts to Hong's faith, traveled to Sigu, Guiping county, Guangxi to preach their version of Christianity. In November 1844, Hong returned home without Feng, who remained in the area and continued to preach. After Hong's departure, Feng traveled deeper and deeper into the heart of the Thistle Mountain region, preaching and baptizing new converts. Feng christened this group of believers the "God Worshipping Society". Hakkas from this area, generally poor and beset by both bandits and local Chinese families angry at the presence of the Hakka in their ancestral lands, found refuge in the group with its promise of solidarity.

While the God Worshipping Society shared some similar characteristics with traditional Chinese secret societies, it differed in that the participants adopted a new religious faith that firmly rejected Chinese tradition as for the one established by the Manchu regime, since they believed that they were following the Chinese tradition, but the original, the Han tradition. The Society was militant from its inception, due to the prevalence of both intervillage fighting and conflicts between Hakka and non-Hakka villagers. Generally, individuals did not convert alone, but rather entire families, clans, occupational groups, or even villages would convert en masse. On 27 August 1847, when Hong Xiuquan returned to the Thistle Mountains, the God Worshipers numbered over 2,000. At this time, most God Worshippers were peasants and miners.

== Growth ==
With Hong's return, the God Worshipping Society took on a more rebellious character. Hong began to describe himself as a king and explicitly identified the ruling Manchus and their supporters as demons which must be destroyed. The God Worshippers treated their entire community as a family, leading to establishment of a common treasury and a requirement of chastity.

In January 1848, Feng Yunshan was arrested and banished to Guangdong. Hong Xiuquan left for Guangdong shortly thereafter to reunite with Feng. In the absence of both Feng and Hong, two new leaders emerged to fill the void: Yang Xiuqing and Xiao Chaogui. Both claimed to enter trances which allowed them to speak as a member of the Trinity: God the Father (Shangdi) in the case of Yang and Jesus Christ in the case of Xiao. While speaking as Jesus or Shangdi, Xiao and Yang would necessarily have more authority than even Hong Xiuquan. Upon their return in the summer of 1849, Hong and Feng investigated Yang and Xiao's claims and declared them to be genuine.

== Jintian Uprising ==
In February 1850, local corps passed through a number of God Worshipping villages and threatened to kill the converts. In response, Feng Yunshan began to call for open revolt by the God Worshippers. In July 1850, the God Worshipper's leaders directed their followers to converge in Jintian and quickly amassed a force of 10,000–30,000 people. While the majority of the group were Hakka, some followers were Punti, Miao, or members of other local tribal groups. Membership in the God Worshippers was eclectic; they counted businessmen, refugees, farmers, mercenaries, and members of secret societies and mutual-protection alliances among their ranks. The God Worshippers were also joined by a number of bandit groups, including several thousand pirates led by Luo Dagang.

== The Taiping Heavenly Kingdom ==
On the 11th day of the first lunar month of 1851, which was also Hong Xiuquan's birthday, the God Worshipping Society proclaimed the Jintian Uprising against the ruling Qing dynasty, and declared the formation of the Taiping Heavenly Kingdom, thus beginning the Taiping Rebellion, which has been described as the "most gigantic man-made disaster" of the nineteenth century. The God Worshippers trained to fight were considered Protestant revolutionaries.

== Impact ==
After the Taiping Heavenly Kingdom launched its uprising, some officials of the Qing Empire equated the God Worshipping Society with Catholicism. For instance, the imperial commissioner and grand secretary Zeng Guofan claimed in his "Proclamation against the Cantonese bandits" (讨粤匪檄): "The Cantonese bandits have stolen the threads of foreign barbarians and venerated the religion of Catholicism ... Those who are incensed by the rampant spread of Catholicism in the Central Plains and rise up in righteous fury to defend our way shall be honored in my staff." After the fall of the Taiping Heavenly Kingdom, many Confucian scholars and people who harbored deep resentment towards the Taiping Heavenly Kingdom vented their anger on Catholicism. This led to the Boxers, who emerged later, frequently attacking Catholic believers and destroying churches.

== See also ==
- Millennarianism in colonial societies

== Notes ==
=== Sources ===
Works cited

- Reilly, Thomas H. (2004). The Taiping Heavenly Kingdom: Rebellion and the Blasphemy of Empire. Seattle: University of Washington Press. ISBN 0295984309.
- Spence, Jonathan (1996), God's Chinese Son, New York: Norton, ISBN 0-393-03844-0
- Kilcourse, Carl S. "Instructing the Heavenly King: Joseph Edkins's Mission to Correct the Theology of Hong Xiuquan." Journal of Ecclesiastical History (2020) 71#1 pp 116–134.
- ——— (1990), The Search for Modern China, New York: Norton
- Kuhn, Philip A. (July 1977), "Origins of the Taiping Vision: Cross-Cultural Dimensions of a Chinese Rebellion", Comparative Studies in Society and History, 19 (3): 350–366, doi:10.1017/S0010417500008756, JSTOR 177996, S2CID 144407449
