= Feng Yunshan =

Feng Yunshan 馮雲山
- South King (南王)
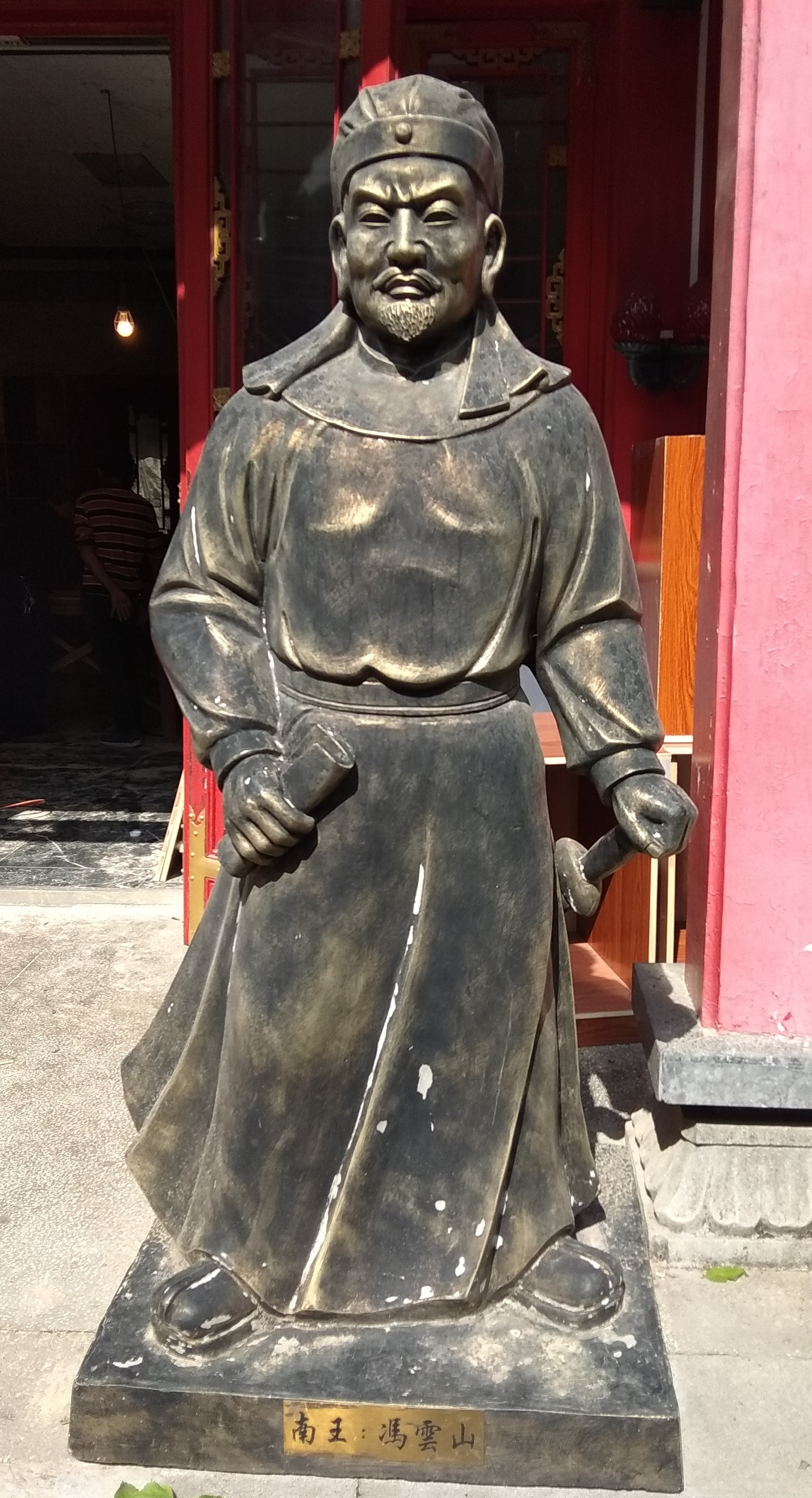

South King of the Heavenly Kingdom
- Reign: 1851–1852
- Successor: Xiao Youfu
- Heavenly King: Hong Xiuquan
- Born: 1815; Hua County, Guangdong, Qing China (present-day Huadu District, Guangzhou)
- Died: June 10, 1852 (aged 36–37); Quanzhou County, Guangxi
Regnal name
- 真天命太平天囯天朝九門御林雲師前導副軍師殿後軍南王七千歲
- Religion: God Worshipping Society
- Military career
- Allegiance: Taiping Heavenly Kingdom
- Conflicts: Taiping Rebellion; Jintian uprising

Chinese name
- Traditional Chinese: 馮雲山
- Simplified Chinese: 冯云山
Transcriptions
Standard Mandarin
- Hanyu Pinyin: Féng Yúnshān
Hakka
- Pha̍k-fa-sṳ: Phùng Yùn-sân
Yue: Cantonese
- Jyutping: Fung^{4} Wan^{4} Saan^{1}

Feng Yunshan (simplified Chinese: 冯云山; traditional Chinese: 馮雲山; 1815 – June 10, 1852) was the South King of the Taiping Heavenly Kingdom, a distant cousin and early accomplice of Hong Xiuquan, and an important leader during the Taiping Rebellion against the Qing government. He was one of the first Taipings to be baptized and established the first group of God Worshippers during the 1840s. He was killed during the initial stages of the rebellion, prior to the establishment of the Taiping's capital of Tianjing at Nanjing.

== Early life ==
Feng Yunshan worked as a village teacher in Heluo Village, Hua county, Guangdong. Although educated, he was unable to pass the imperial examinations. Like Hong Xiuquan, he was a Hakka, and he was among the first of Hong's converts to Hong's new religion, backlash to which cost him his teaching position. Feng, Hong, and two other relatives of Hong left Hua county in April 1844. They first traveled to Guangzhou and preached in the outlying areas before heading northwest to White Tiger Village. There, Feng and Hong split off and traveled some 250 miles to the southwest to the village of Sigu, Guiping county, Guangxi, where distant relatives of Hong's resided, including two early converts who had returned home. In November 1844, Hong returned home without Feng, who remained in the area and continued to preach.

== God-worshiping Society ==
After Hong Xiuquan's departure, Feng traveled deeper and deeper into the heart of the Thistle Mountain region, preaching and baptizing new converts. Feng christened this group of believers the "God Worshipping Society." Hakkas from this area, generally poor and beset by both bandits and local Chinese families angry at the presence of the Hakka in their ancestral lands, found refuge in the group with its promise of solidarity. On August 27, 1847, Feng and the Society were joined by the returning Hong Xiuquan.

In the months following Hong Xiuquan's return, Feng was twice captured by a competing local corps. On the first occasion in December 1847, the God Worshipers freed him by force. When Feng was captured a second time in January 1848, he was sent to a local magistrate who, after receiving a bribe from the God Worshippers, released him on the condition that he return to Guangdong. Feng was unable to return to the God Worshippers until the summer of the following year. Upon his return, he discovered that Yang Xiuqing and Xiao Chaogui had taken leadership roles within God Worshipping Society. Both claimed to enter trances which allowed them to speak as a member of the Trinity; God the Father (Shangdi) in the case of Yang and Jesus Christ in the case of Xiao. When Feng returned in the summer of 1849, he and Hong Xiuquan investigated Yang and Xiao's claims and declared them to be genuine. In early 1850, Feng became the first leader of the God Worshipper Society to call for open revolt.

== Taiping Rebellion ==
Feng was later announced as the "South King" of the Taiping Rebellion. He is credited with being the strategist of the rebellion and the administrator of the kingdom during its early days.

On May 24, 1852, as the Taiping marched by Quanzhou, Guangxi with no intention of invading, a Qing gunner fatally wounded Feng as he sat in his sedan chair. Rallied by the news, the Taiping surrounded Quanzhou and, in the space of two days, breached the walls and killed every citizen who had not fled. Feng finally succumbed to his wounds in June that year.
