= Battle of Changsha (1852) =

- Part of Taiping Rebellion
Location	Changsha, Hunan
Result	Taiping retreat, siege lifted

Belligerents
Taiping Heavenly Kingdom	Qing dynasty

Commanders and leaders
Hong Xiuquan; Xiao Chaogui †	Jiang Zhongyuan

The Battle of Changsha was fought in the early years of the Taiping Rebellion throughout 1852. After defeating Qing forces in Guangxi, the Taipings advanced into neighboring Hunan province. The city was heavily defended and a delay in the Taiping advance allowed Qing forces to reinforce the city. The first attempt to advance north was stopped at an ambush at the Suoyi ford in the Xiang River, where over 10,000 Taiping sailors and soldiers were killed.

The Taiping army recruited miners from the local area to build siege tunnels in an effort to breach the city walls. However, only three of the ten tunnels built ended up reaching the walls. Eventually, most of the surrounding area and rivers were captured by the Taiping rebels.

In September, the West King Xiao Chaogui attempted to boost morale by hoisting banners and donning his royal robes on the battlefield, but was spotted by a Qing gunner and killed. With the death of one of the original Kings, by November, Hong Xiuquan called off the siege and Taiping forces continued north down the Xiang River towards Wuchang, Hubei.

== Later engagements ==
In 1855, the Taiping Western Expedition succeeded in capturing Changsha and much of Hunan. However, in 1856, Zeng Guofan’s Xiang Army retook Hunan for the Qing dynasty.
