= Xiao Chaogui =

Xiao Chaogui 蕭朝貴
- West King (西王)
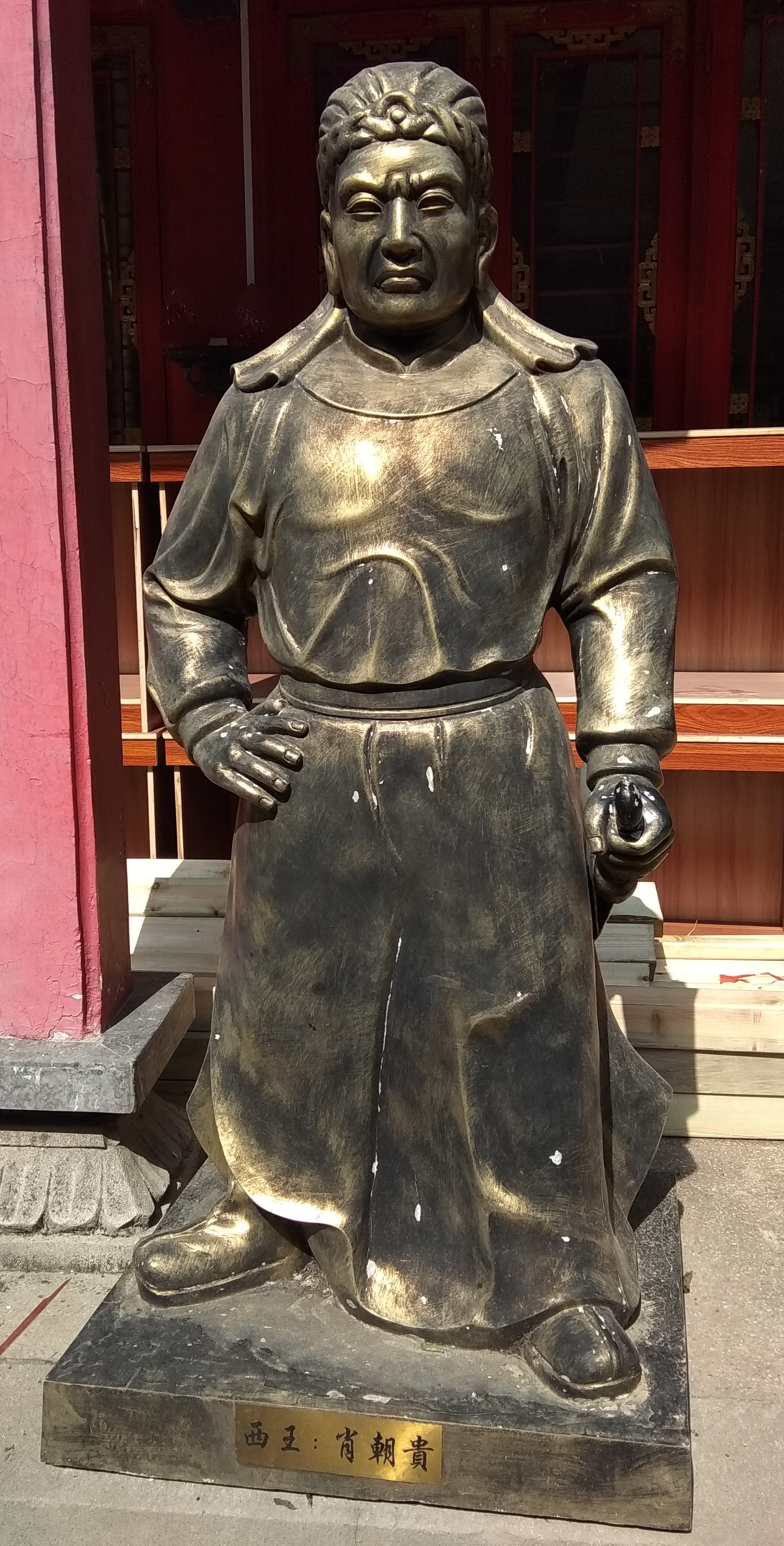

West King of the Heavenly Kingdom
- Reign: 1851–1852
- Successor: Xiao Youhe
- Heavenly King: Hong Xiuquan
- Born: c.1820 Wuxuan County, Guangxi, Qing China
- Died: September 1852 near Changsha, Hunan
- Spouse: Hong Xuanjiao
- Issue: Xiao Youhe (蕭有和); Xiao Youfu (蕭有福)
Regnal name
- 真天命太平天囯傳救世主天兄基督太子聖旨聖神上帝之雨電右弼又正軍師西王八千歲
- Religion: God Worshipping Society
- Military career
- Allegiance: Taiping Heavenly Kingdom
- Branch: Front Army Corps
- Rank: Commander in Chief
- Conflicts: Taiping Rebellion: Jintian uprising; Battle of Changsha (1852)

Xiao Chaogui (simplified Chinese: 萧朝贵; traditional Chinese: 蕭朝貴; pinyin: Xiāo Cháoguì; c. 1820 – September 1852) was an important leader during the early years of the Taiping Rebellion against the Qing dynasty of China. He was a sworn brother to Hong Xiuquan, the leader of the Taipings, and claimed to serve as a mouthpiece for Jesus Christ. Because of his importance to the rebellion, he was awarded the title of the "West King."

== Early life ==
Xiao Chaogui was a poor peasant farmer from Wuxuan, now part of Guiping, in the Thistle Mountain region of Guangxi. Despite his modest means, he became an influential leader in the region. He was probably a member of the Hakka people, but it has also been suggested that he was Yao. He may have been a relative of Yang Xiuqing. He, along with his wife, father, and brothers, joined Hong Xiuquan's Society of God Worshippers. He possessed a "legendary reputation for valor and physical strength."

== Wife ==
He was married to Yang Yunjiao, a zealous God Worshipper. Yang claimed to have visited Heaven in 1837 during a serious illness and to have been informed of the coming of a religious instructor, who was later presumed to be Hong Xiuquan.

Some sources have stated that, following the death of his first wife, Xiao married Hong Xuanjiao, a younger sister of Hong Xiuquan. This Hong Xuanjiao has left an imprint on Chinese culture as a valiant female warrior. However, Hong Xiuquan had no younger sister. Instead, it appears that wives of Taiping Kings like Xiao Chaogui were referred to as "younger sisters" of Hong Xiuquan. The most likely explanation appears to be that Yang Yunjiao and Hong Xuanjiao were the same person; Yang Yunjiao changed her given name from Yunjiao to Xuanjiao (possibly due to issues related to pronunciation), and folk historians provided her with the surname Hong to honor Hong Xiuquan.

== The God Worshippers ==
In the autumn of 1848, while Feng Yunshan and Hong Xiuquan were in a neighboring province, Xiao Chaogui assumed a leadership role in the God-Worshipping Society. At this time, Xiao began to claim that Jesus Christ had descended to earth and that Jesus spoke through him while he himself was in a trance. This claim was ratified by Hong Xiuquan and Feng Yunshan when the two returned to Thistle Mountain the following summer. Xiao, speaking as Jesus, provided doctrine, advice, and leadership to the God Worshippers. When speaking as Jesus, Xiao was able to reprimand even Hong Xiuquan, as Jesus necessarily possessed greater authority than even Hong. During that summer of 1848, Xiao entered into a sworn brotherhood with Hong Xiuquan, Feng Yunshan, Yang Xiuqing, Wei Changhui, Shi Dakai, and Jesus Christ.

== Leadership in the Taiping Rebellion ==
Xiao acted as one of the principal military commanders of the Taiping forces in the early days of the Taiping Rebellion and was named commander in chief of the Taiping's Front Army Corps on January 11, 1851. Shortly after their capture of Yongan, Hong Xiuquan named Xiao Co-Marshal, the ceremonial rank of marshal being the "ultimate mark of distinction in the Taiping organization." On December 4, 1851, Hong bestowed further honors on Xiao, declaring him to be the West King, Lord of 8,000 Years. Six days later, during a Qing counterattack on a supply depot near Yongan, Xiao was wounded. With one minor exception, Xiao ceased to speak with the voice of Jesus soon thereafter.

In the summer of 1852 while the Taiping were encamped in Daozhou, three proclamations were issued by Xiao and Yang Xiuqing (by then the East King of the Taipings) in an attempt to gain the sympathy of the locals and to drum up new recruits. These proclamations demonstrated the triune religious-nationalist-political nature of the Taiping Rebellion by calling for the conversion of the people to Bài Shàngdì Huì (Supreme Emperor Worshipping Society), (Note: In some translations, the name appears as the Supreme Emperor Worshipping Society because "Shang Di" is the pinyin romanization of two Chinese characters: the first – 上, Shàng – means "high", "highest", "first", "primordial"; the second – 帝, Dì – is typically considered as shorthand for huangdi (皇帝) in modern Chinese, the title of the emperors of China first employed by Qin Shi Huang, and is usually translated as "emperor".) for the ruling ethnic-minority Manchus to be overthrown, and for the destruction of a government the Taipings considered to be thoroughly corrupt. The proclamations hardened the opposition of the gentry and scholars but helped convince over 20,000 locals to join the rebellion.

== Death ==
In late August 1852, Xiao led a small force from Chenzhou, the current base of the Taiping, in attempt to capture the city of Changsha. They arrived at Changsha in September and began besieging the city. Seeing little progress being made, Xiao chose to don robes indicating his noble rank, hoisted a large banner above his head, and headed to the front lines to direct his troops. He was quickly hit in the left shoulder by a cannonball fired from the walls of the city and succumbed to his wounds near the end of September. The siege was ultimately abandoned in November. Xiao's actions leading up to his death have been harshly condemned by Chinese historians, who characterize them as "not an act of heroism but another example of 'stupid loyalty and stupid valor.'"

Despite his death, Hong Xiuquan continued to regularly issue decrees in his name. He was also posthumously awarded the title "Rain Master." One of his sons inherited his noble title and was addressed as Junior West King, until his death in the aftermath of the fall of Nanjing. Both sons were considered to be nephews to Jesus and grandchildren to Shangdi.
