= Hong Xiuquan =

Chinese revolutionary (1814–1864)

Hong Xiuquan; 洪秀全
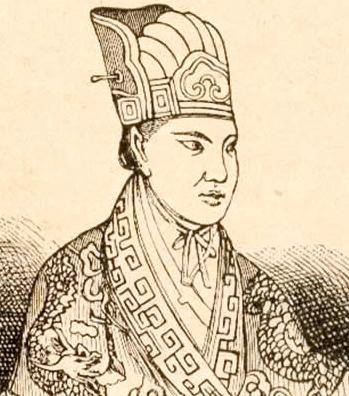
- Alleged (Note: According to P. Richard Bohr, this is a Woodblock print of an unidentified Taiping leader.) drawing of Hong Xiuquan, dating from around the early 1850s

Taiping Heavenly King
- Reign: 11 January 1851 – 1 June 1864
- Successor: Hong Tianguifu
- Born: Hong Huoxiu (洪火秀); 1 January 1814 (Note: No fewer than 9 dates have been given for Hong Xiuquan's birth; 1 January 1814 is accepted by most scholars, including Jian Youwen and Luo Ergang.); Hua County, Guangdong, Qing dynasty
- Died: 1 June 1864 (aged 50); Tianjing, Taiping Heavenly Kingdom
- Spouse: Lai Xiying (賴惜英) or Lai Lianying (賴蓮英)
Names
- Hong Xiuquan (洪秀全)
Era name and dates
- 太平天囯: 11 January 1851 – 1 June 1864
- Father: Hong Jingyang (洪鏡揚)
- Mother: Madam Wang (王氏)
- Religion: God Worshipping Society

Hong Xiuquan
- Chinese: 洪秀全
Transcriptions
Standard Mandarin
- Hanyu Pinyin: Hóng Xiùquán
- Bopomofo: ㄏㄨㄥˊ ㄒㄧㄡˋ ㄑㄩㄢˊ
- Wade–Giles: Hung^{2} Hsiu^{4}-ch'üan^{2}
- Tongyong Pinyin: Hóng Siòu-cyuán
- IPA: [xʊ̌ŋ ɕjôʊ.tɕʰɥɛ̌n]
Hakka
- Pha̍k-fa-sṳ: Fùng Siu-chhiòn
Yue: Cantonese
- Yale Romanization: Hùhng Sauchyùhn
- Jyutping: hung4 sau3 cyun4
- IPA: [hʊŋ˩ sɐw˧ tsʰyn˩]

Courtesy name
- Chinese: 洪仁坤
Transcriptions
Standard Mandarin
- Hanyu Pinyin: Hóng Rénkūn
- Bopomofo: ㄏㄨㄥˊ ㄖㄣˊ ㄎㄨㄣ
- Wade–Giles: Hung^{2} Jen^{2}-k'un^{1}
- Tongyong Pinyin: Hóng Rén-kun
- IPA: [xʊ̌ŋ ɻə̌n.kʰwə́n]
Hakka
- Pha̍k-fa-sṳ: Fùng Yìn-khûn
Yue: Cantonese
- Yale Romanization: Hùhng Yàhnkwān
- Jyutping: hung4 jan4 kwan1
- IPA: [hʊŋ˩ jɐn˩ kʷʰɐn˥]

Birth name
- Chinese: 洪火秀
Transcriptions
Standard Mandarin
- Hanyu Pinyin: Hóng Huǒxiù
- Bopomofo: ㄏㄨㄥˊ ㄏㄨㄛˇ ㄒㄧㄡˋ
- Wade–Giles: Hung^{2} Huo^{3}-hsiu^{4}
- Tongyong Pinyin: Hóng Huǒ-siòu
- IPA: [xʊ̌ŋ xwò.ɕjôʊ]
Hakka
- Pha̍k-fa-sṳ: Fùng Fósiu

Hong Xiuquan (Note: Chinese: 洪秀全; pinyin: Hóng Xiùquán, Pha̍k-fa-sṳ: Fùng Siu-chhiòn) (1 January 1814 – 1 June 1864), born Hong Huoxiu (Note: Chinese: 洪火秀; pinyin: Hóng Huǒxiù, Pha̍k-fa-sṳ: Fùng Fó-siu) and with the courtesy name Renkun, was a Chinese revolutionary and religious leader who led the Taiping Rebellion against the Qing dynasty. He established the Taiping Heavenly Kingdom over large portions of southern China, with himself as its "Heavenly King".

Born into a Hakka family in Guangzhou, Hong claimed to have experienced mystical visions after repeatedly failing the imperial examinations. He came to believe that his celestial father, whom he saw in the visions, was God the Father, his celestial elder brother was Jesus Christ, and he had been directed to rid the world of demon worship. He rejected Confucianism and began propagating a fusion of Christianity, Daoism and millenarianism, which Hong presented as a restoration of the ancient Chinese faith in Shangdi. His associate Feng Yunshan then founded the God Worshipping Society to spread Hong's teachings. By 1850, Hong's sect had over 10,000 followers and increasingly came into conflict with Qing authorities.

In January 1851, Hong organized a rebel army and routed the Qing forces at Jintian, marking the beginning of the Taiping Rebellion. He then declared himself the Heavenly King of the Heavenly Kingdom of Peace. Taiping rebels captured the city of Nanjing in March 1853 and renamed it Tianjing (Heavenly Capital), after which Hong withdrew to his new palace and began ruling through proclamations. He became increasingly suspicious of Yang Xiuqing, his fellow Taiping leader, and engineered Yang's murder in an 1856 purge now known as the Tianjing incident that spiraled into the further purge of more Taiping leaders. The kingdom gradually lost ground and in June 1864, in the face of Qing advance, Hong died following a period of illness and was succeeded by his son, Hong Tianguifu. Nanjing fell a month later.

== Early life and education ==
Hong Xiuquan, born "Hong Huoxiu", was the third and youngest son of a Hakka family living in the village of Fuyuan Springs (also referred to as Fuyuanshui village), Hua county (now part of Huadu District) in Guangzhou. His father was Hong Jingyang, a farmer and elected headman and his mother was surnamed Wang. No less than nine different dates are given for Hong Xiuquan's birth: Jian Youwen established based on documentary evidence that Hong was born on 1 January 1814. This date is accepted by most scholars, including noted Chinese historian Luo Ergang. Some sources claim his family was "well to do". He and his family moved to Guanlubu Village shortly after his birth. Upon marrying his wife Lai Xiying, Hong received the courtesy name "Renkun." His sister, Hong Xuanjiao, became the commander of the female battalion during the Taiping Rebellion.

Hong showed an interest in scholarship at an early age, so his family made financial sacrifices to provide a formal education for him, in the hope that he could one day complete all of the civil service examinations. Hong began studying at a primary school in his village at the age of five. He was able to recite the Four Books after five or six years. He then took the local entry-level civil service examinations and placed first. A few years later, he traveled to the provincial capital of Guangzhou to take the provincial examinations. He was unsuccessful and, his parents being unable to afford to continue his education, he was forced to return to agricultural work. The next year, he accompanied a wealthy schoolmate elsewhere for a year of study and became a village schoolteacher upon his return.

In 1836, at the age of 22, Hong returned to Guangzhou to retake the imperial examinations. While in Guangzhou, Hong heard Edwin Stevens, a foreign missionary, and his interpreter preaching about Christianity. From them, Hong received a set of pamphlets entitled "Good Words for Exhorting the Age", which were written by Liang Fa, Stevens's assistant, and contained excerpts from the Bible along with homilies and other material prepared by Liang. Supposedly, Hong only briefly looked over these pamphlets and did not pay much attention to them at the time. Unsurprisingly, he again failed the imperial examinations, which had a pass rate of less than one percent.

== Visions and iconoclasm ==
In 1837, Hong attempted and failed the imperial examinations for a third time, leading to a nervous breakdown. He was delirious for days to the point that his family feared for his life. While convalescing, Hong dreamed of visiting Heaven, where he discovered that he possessed a celestial family distinct from his earthly family, which included a heavenly father, mother, elder brother, sister-in-law, wife, and son. His heavenly father, wearing a black dragon robe and high-brimmed hat with a long golden beard, lamented that men were worshiping demons rather than he himself, and presented Hong with a sword and golden seal with which to slay the demons infesting Heaven. Furthermore, he did so with the help of his celestial older-brother and a heavenly army. The father figure later informed Hong that his given name violated taboos and had to be changed, suggesting as one option the "Hong Xiuquan" moniker ultimately adopted by Hong. In later embellishments, Hong would declare that he also saw Confucius being punished by Hong's celestial father for leading the people astray. His acquaintances would later claim that after awakening from his dreams Hong became more careful, friendly, and open, while his pace became imposing and firm and his height and size increased. Hong stopped studying for the imperial examinations and sought work as a teacher. For the next several years Hong taught at several schools around the area of his hometown.

In 1843, Hong failed the imperial examinations for the fourth and final time. It was only then, prompted by a visit by his cousin, that Hong took time to carefully examine the Christian pamphlets he had received. After reading these pamphlets, Hong came to believe that they had given him the key to interpreting his visions: his celestial father was God the Father (whom he identified with Shangdi from Chinese tradition), the elder brother that he had seen was Jesus Christ, and he had been directed to rid the world of demon worship. This interpretation led him to conclude that he was the literal son of God and younger brother to Jesus. In contrast to some of the later leaders of his movement, Hong appears to have genuinely believed in his ascent to Heaven and divine mission. After coming to this conclusion Hong began destroying idols and enthusiastically preaching his interpretation of Christianity. As a symbolic gesture to purge China of Confucianism, he and the cousin asked for two giant swords, three chi (1 meter (3.3 ft)) long and nine jin (about 4.5 kg), called the "demon-slaying swords" (斬妖劍), to be forged.

Hong began by burning all Confucian and Buddhist statues and books in his house, and began preaching to his community about his visions. Some of his earliest converts were relatives of his who had also failed their examinations and belonged to the Hakka minority, Feng Yunshan and Hong Rengan. He collaborated with them to destroy holy statues in small villages, to the ire of local citizens and officials. Hong and his converts' acts were considered sacrilegious and they were persecuted by Confucians who forced them to leave their positions as village tutors. In April 1844, Hong, Feng Yunshan, and two other relatives of Hong left Hua county to travel and preach. They first journeyed to Guangzhou and preached in the outlying areas before heading northwest to White Tiger Village. There, Hong and Feng Yunshan parted ways before traveling some 400 kilometers (250 mi) to the southwest to the village of Sigu, Guiping county, Guangxi, where distant relatives of Hong's resided, including two early converts who had returned home. It is in or near Sigu that Hong begins to draft "Exhortations to Worship the One True God", his first substantial work. In November 1844, after having preached in Guangxi for five months, Hong returned home without Feng and resumed his previous job as a village teacher, while continuing to write religious tracts.

== The "God Worshippers" ==
In 1847, Hong Xiuquan was invited by a member of the Chinese Union to study with the American Southern Baptist missionary Reverend Issachar Jacox Roberts. Hong accepted the invitation and traveled to Guangzhou with his cousin, Hong Rengan. Once there, Hong studied Karl Gützlaff's translations of the Old and New Testaments, converted to Protestantism and requested to be baptized by Roberts. Roberts refused to do so, possibly due to Hong being tricked by the other converts into requesting monetary aid from Roberts. Hong left Guangzhou on 12 July 1847 to search for Feng Yunshan. Although robbed of all of his possessions, including his demon-slaying sword, by bandits in the town of Meizixun, he eventually reached Thistle Mountain on 27 August 1847. There, he reunited with Feng and discovered the "Society of God-Worshippers" that Feng had founded.

In January 1848, Feng Yunshan was arrested and banished to Guangdong, and Hong Xiuquan left for Guangdong shortly thereafter to once again reunite with Feng. In Feng and Hong's absence, Yang Xiuqing and Xiao Chaogui jointly emerged to lead the "God Worshipers" themselves. Both claimed to enter trances which allowed them to speak as a member of the Trinity; God the Father in the case of Yang and Jesus Christ in the case of Xiao. When Hong and Feng returned in the summer of 1849, they investigated Yang and Xiao's claims and declared them to be genuine. Hong ministered to the faithful in outdoor meetings strongly resembling the Baptist tent revivals he had witnessed with Issachar Roberts.

Most of Hong Xiuquan's knowledge of the scriptures came from the books known as "Good Words to Admonish the Age" written by the Chinese preacher Liang Fa, as well as a localized Bible translated into Chinese. Many Western missionaries grew jealous of Hong and his local ministry. These competing missionaries were fond of spreading defamatory rumors such as his "lack of baptism." (Hong and his cousin were in fact both baptized according to the way prescribed in the pamphlet "Good words to admonish the age").

In 1847, Hong began his translation and adaptation of the Bible, what came to be known as "Authorized Taiping Version of the Bible", or "The Taiping Bible", which he based on Gutzlaff's translation. He presented his followers with the Bible as a vision of the authentic religion that had existed in ancient China before it was wiped out by Confucius and the imperial system. The deity of the Old Testament punished evil nations and rewarded those who followed his commandments, even music, food, and marriage laws.

Hong made some minor changes in the text, such as correcting misprints and improving the prose style, but adapted the meaning elsewhere to fit his own theology and moral teachings. For instance, in Genesis 27:25 the Israelites did not drink wine, and in Genesis 38:16–26 he omitted the sexual relations between the father and his son's widow. Hong preached a mixture of communal utopianism, evangelism and oriental syncretism. While proclaiming sexual equality, the sect segregated men from women and encouraged all its followers to pay their assets into a communal treasury.

When Hong returned to Guangxi, he found that Feng Yunshan had accumulated a following of around 2,000 converts. Guangxi was a dangerous area at this time with many bandit groups based in the mountains and pirates on the rivers. Perhaps due to these more pressing concerns, the authorities were largely tolerant of Hong and his followers. However, the instability of the region meant that Hong's followers were inevitably drawn into conflict with other groups, not least because of their predominantly Hakka ethnicity. There are records of numerous incidents when local villages and clans, as well as groups of pirates and bandits, came into conflict with the authorities, and responded by fleeing to join Hong's movement. The rising tension between the sect and the authorities was probably the most important factor in Hong's eventual decision to rebel.

== Rebellion and the Heavenly Kingdom ==
By 1850, Hong had between 10,000 and 30,000 followers. The authorities were alarmed at the growing size of the sect, and ordered them to disperse. A local force was sent to attack them when they refused, but the imperial troops were routed and a deputy magistrate killed. A full-scale attack was launched by government forces in the first month of 1851, in what came to be known as the Jintian Uprising, named after the town of Jintian (which became Guiping, Guangxi) where the sect was based. Hong's followers emerged victorious and beheaded the Manchu commander of the government army. Hong declared the founding of the "Heavenly Kingdom of Transcendent Peace" on 11 January 1851. Despite this evidence of planning, Hong and his followers faced immediate challenges. The local Green Standard Army outnumbered them ten to one, and had recruited the help of the river pirates to keep the rebellion contained to Jintian. After a month of preparation the rebels managed to break through the blockade and fight their way to the town of Yongan (in present-day Yongfu County), which fell to them on 25 September 1851.

Hong and his troops remained in Yongan for three months, sustained by local landowners who were hostile to the Manchu-ruled Qing dynasty. The imperial army regrouped and launched another attack on the rebels in Yongan. Having run out of gunpowder, Hong's followers fought their way out by sword, and made for the city of Guilin, to which they laid siege. However, the fortifications of Guilin proved too strong, and Hong and his followers eventually gave up and set out northwards, towards Hunan. Here, they encountered an elite militia created by a local member of the gentry specifically to put down peasant rebellions. The two forces fought at Soyi Ford on 10 June 1852; the rebels were forced into retreat, and 20% of their troops were killed. However, in March 1853, Hong's forces managed to take Nanjing and turned it into the capital of their movement, naming it Tianjing (Heavenly Kingdom).

After establishing the capital, Hong implemented an ambitious reform and modernization program. He created an elaborate civil bureaucracy, reformed the calendar used in his kingdom, outlawed opium use, and introduced a number of reforms designed to make women more socially equal to men. Hong ruled by making frequent proclamations from his Heavenly Palace, demanding strict compliance with various moral and religious rules. Most trade was suppressed, and some communal land ownership was introduced. Polygamy was forbidden and men and women were separated, although Hong and other leaders maintained groups of concubines.

Yang Xiuqing, also known as the "Eastern King", was a fellow Taiping leader who had directed successful military campaigns, and who often claimed to speak with the voice of God. Hong became increasingly suspicious of Yang's ambitions and his network of spies. In 1856, he and others in the Taiping elite had Yang and his family murdered in a purge know known as the Tianjing incident. That action subsequently spun out of control, resulting in the further purge of its main perpetrator Wei Changhui.

Following a failed attempt by the Taiping rebels to take Shanghai in 1860, Qing government forces, aided by Western officers, slowly gained ground.

== Death ==
In the spring of 1864, Tianjing was besieged and dangerously low on food supplies. Hong's solution was to order his subjects to eat manna, which had been translated into Chinese as sweetened dew and a medicinal herb. Hong himself gathered weeds from the grounds of his palace, which he then ate. Hong fell ill in April 1864, possibly due to his ingestion of the weeds, and died on 1 June 1864. Although Hong likely died of his illness, suicide by poison has also been suggested. He was buried in a yellow-silk shroud without a coffin according to Taiping custom, near the former Ming Imperial Palace. He was succeeded by his teenage son, Hong Tianguifu.

On 30 July 1864, Qing forces exhumed, beheaded, and cremated Hong Xiuquan's body. Zeng Guofan (one of the prominent Qing generals) had ordered this done to verify Hong Xiuquan's death. The ashes were blasted out of a cannon to ensure that his remains had no resting place, as an eternal punishment for the uprising.

== Legacy ==
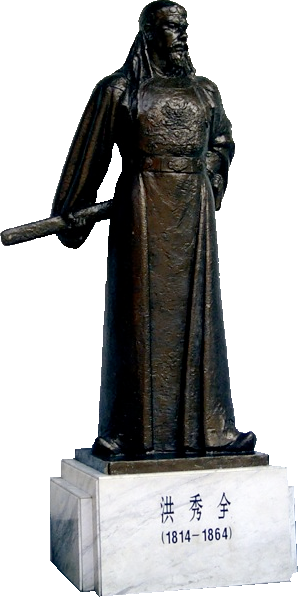
A statue of Hong in Nanjing

Views and opinions on Hong differ greatly. The Communists under Mao Zedong generally admired Hong and his rebellion as a legitimate peasant uprising that anticipated their own. Sun Yat-sen came from the same area as Hong and was said to have identified with Hong since his childhood days.

To honor his legacy, the People's Republic of China established a small museum in 1959, the "Hong Xiuquan's Former Residence Memorial Museum" (洪秀全故居紀念館), in his birthplace, where there is a longan tree planted by him. The museum's plate is written by the famous literary figure Guo Moruo (1892–1978). The residence and Book Chamber Building were renovated in 1961.

== Publications ==
- Imperial Decree of Taiping (《太平詔書》) (1852)
- The Instructions on the Original Way Series (《原道醒世訓》系列) (1845–1848): included in the Imperial Decree of Taiping later. The series is proclaimed by the People's Republic of China's National Affairs Department to be a Protected National Significant Document in 1988.
  - Instructions on the Original Way to Save the World (《原道救世訓》)
  - Instructions on the Original Way to Awake the World (《原道醒世訓》)
  - Instructions on the Original Way to Make the World Realize (《原道覺世訓》)
- The Heavenly Father's poem (《天父詩》) (1857)
- New Essay on Economics and Politics (《資政新篇》) (1859)

=== Poetry ===
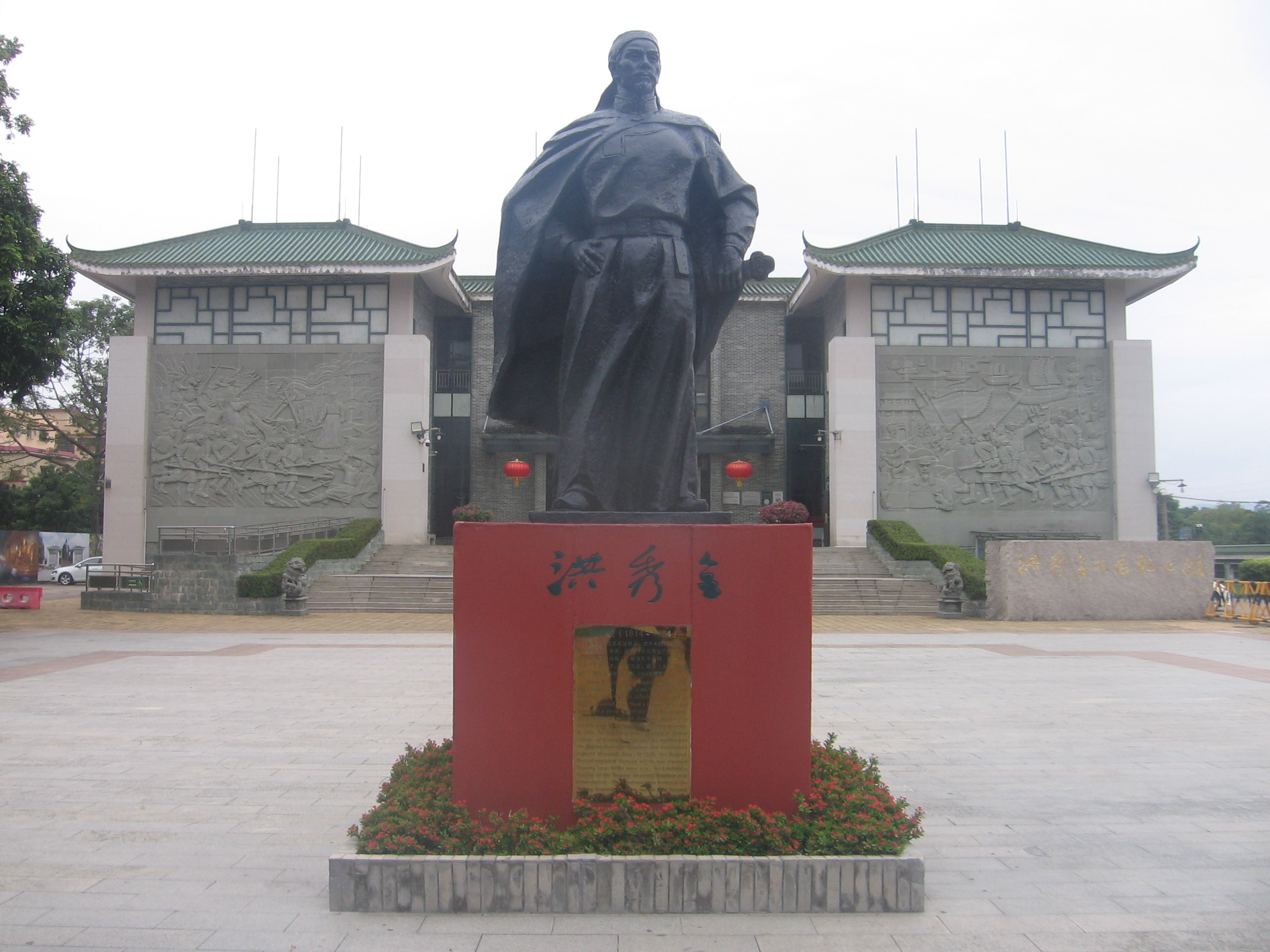
Statue of Hong Xiuquan in front of his former residence in Guangzhou

The following poem, titled Poem on Executing the Evil and Preserving the Righteous (斬邪留正詩), written in 1837 by Hong Xiuquan, illustrates his religious thinking and goal that later led to the establishment of the "Heavenly Kingdom of Taiping". Note that in the seventh line, the name of the then yet-to-come kingdom is mentioned.

《斬邪留正詩》

Poem on Executing the Evil and Preserving the Righteous

手握乾坤殺伐權，

In my hand I wield the Universe and the power to attack and kill,

斬邪留正解民懸。

I slay the evil, preserve the righteous, and relieve the people's suffering.

眼通西北江山外，

My eyes see through beyond the west, the north, the rivers, and the mountains,

聲振東南日月邊。

My voice shakes the east, the south, the Sun, and the Moon.

璽劍光榮存帝賜，

The glorious sword of authority was given by the Lord,

詩章憑據誦爺前，

Poems and books are evidences that praise Yahweh in front of Him.

太平一統光世界，

Taiping [Perfect Peace] unifies the World of Light,

威風快樂萬千年。

The domineering air will be joyous for myriads of millennia.

== See also ==
- Hong Xuanjiao
- Millennarianism in colonial societies
- Liberation theology
- Sino-Christian theology
- Autotheism
- Private revelation
- Messiah complex
- Entering heaven alive
- Christianity in China

Regnal titles
Preceded by Position established	Heavenly King of Taiping; 1851-1864	Succeeded by Hong Tianguifu
