= Baisha, Guiping =

Baisha 白沙镇
- Town
- Location in Guangxi
- Coordinates: 23°12′26″N 109°55′38″E
- Country: People's Republic of China
- Autonomous Region: Guangxi
- Prefecture-level city: Guigang
- County-level city: Guiping
- Time zone: UTC+8 (China Standard)

Baisha (Chinese: 白沙) is a town of Guiping, Guangxi, China. As of 2018, it has 14 villages under its administration.
