= Taiping Heavenly Kingdom =

Theocratic monarchy in China (1851–1864)

Heavenly Kingdom of Great Peace 太平天国
- 1851–1864
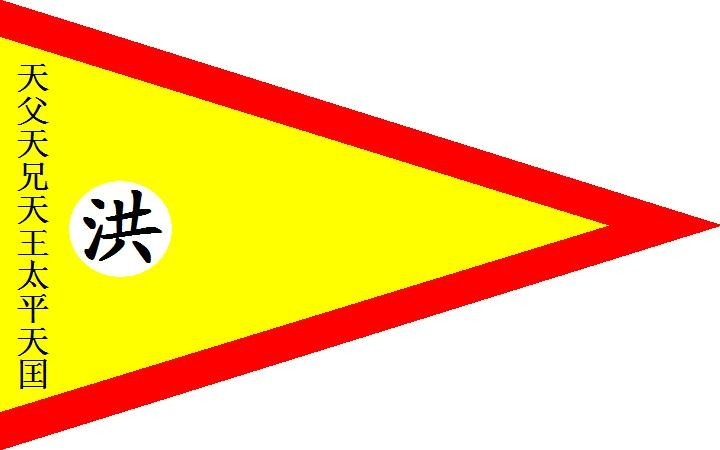
- Flag

- Seal

- Outline of the Taiping Heavenly Kingdom Held at various times during the Taiping Rebellion Early period Late period
- Capital: Tianjing (now Nanjing)
- Religion: God Worshipping Society (official); Chinese folk religion; Buddhism; Taoism
- Government: Theocratic absolute monarchy
- Taiping Heavenly King
  - 1851–1864: Hong Xiuquan
  - 1864: Hong Tianguifu
- Kings/Prince
  - 1851–1852: Feng Yunshan
  - 1851–1856: Yang Xiuqing
  - 1851–1852: Xiao Chaogui
  - 1851–1856: Wei Changhui
  - 1851–1863: Shi Dakai
  - 1859–1864: Hong Rengan
- Historical era: Late modern period
  - Jintian Uprising: 11 January 1851
  - Capture of Nanjing: 19 March 1853
  - Tianjing Incident: 1856
  - Fall of Nanjing: 19 July 1864
  - Capture of Hong Tianguifu: 25 October 1864
- Currency: Shengbao (cash)
| Preceded by | Succeeded by |
| Qing dynasty | Qing dynasty |

Taiping Heavenly Kingdom
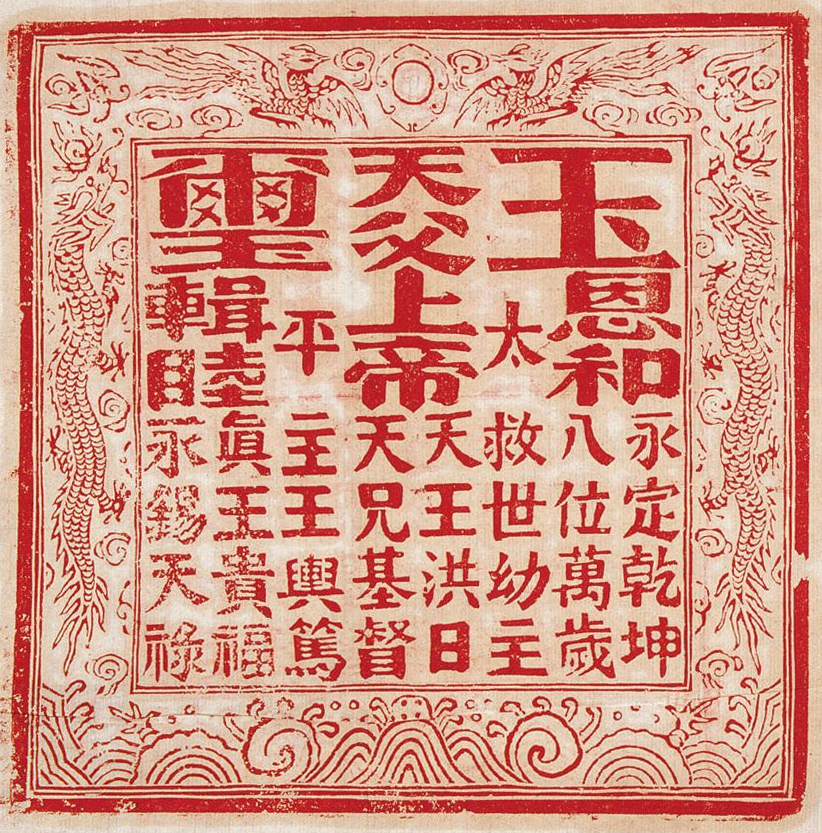
- Royal seal of the Taiping Heavenly Kingdom
- Traditional Chinese: 太平天國
- Simplified Chinese: 太平天国
- Literal meaning: Heavenly Kingdom of Great Peace; Greatly Peaceful Heavenly Kingdom
Transcriptions
Standard Mandarin
- Hanyu Pinyin: Tàipíng Tiānguó
- Bopomofo: ㄊㄞˋ ㄆㄧㄥˊ ㄊㄧㄢ ㄍㄨㄛˊ
- Wade–Giles: T'ai^{4}-p'ing^{2} T'ien^{1}-kuo^{2}
- Tongyong Pinyin: Tài-píng Tian-guó
- IPA: [tʰâɪ.pʰǐŋ tʰjɛ́n.kwǒ]
Wu
- Wugniu: ^{5}Tha-bin 1Thi-^{7}koq
Hakka
- Pha̍k-fa-sṳ: Thai-phìn Thiên-koet
Yue: Cantonese
- Jyutping: Taai^{3}-ping^{4} Tin^{1}-gwok^{3}
- IPA: [tʰaj˧ pʰɪŋ˩ tʰin˥ kʷɔk̚˧]
Southern Min
- Hokkien POJ: Thài-pêng Thian-kok
- Teochew Peng'im: Tai^{3} pêng^{5} Tiang^{1} gog^{4}
Eastern Min
- Fuzhou BUC: Tái-bàng Tiĕng-guók
Northern Min
- Jian'ou Romanized: Tuo̿i-běng Tíng-gŏ

The Taiping Heavenly Kingdom, or the Heavenly Kingdom of Great Peace (1851–1864), was a theocratic monarchy that sought to overthrow the Qing dynasty. The Heavenly Kingdom, or Heavenly Dynasty, (Note: Taiping Heavenly Kingdom, later shortened to Heavenly Kingdom (天囯) or Heavenly Dynasty (天朝). Other official names of this kingdom were: Taiping Heavenly Kingdom of Heaven's True Will (真天命太平天囯), and Taiping Heavenly Kingdom of the Heavenly Father, Heavenly Brother, and Heavenly King (天父天兄天王太平天囯).) was led by Hong Xiuquan, a Hakka man from Guangzhou. The kingdom's capital was established in Tianjing, present-day Nanjing. The unsuccessful 14-year war the Taiping Heavenly Kingdom waged against the Qing is known as the Taiping Rebellion.

The self-proclaimed younger brother of Jesus Christ and convert to Protestant Christianity, Hong Xiuquan, led an army that controlled a significant part of southern China during the middle of the 19th century. Under his leadership, the Taiping movement expanded to an area populated by nearly 30 million people. The rebel kingdom announced social reforms and the replacement of traditional cults for his own Bài Shàngdì Huì (Supreme Emperor Worshipping Society), (Note: In some translations, the name appears as the Supreme Emperor Worshipping Society because "Shang Di" is the pinyin romanization of two Chinese characters: the first – 上, Shàng – means "high", "highest", "first", "primordial"; the second – 帝, Dì – is typically considered as shorthand for huangdi (皇帝) in modern Chinese, the title of the emperors of China first employed by Qin Shi Huang, and is usually translated as "emperor".) holding that he was the second son of Heavenly Father and the Heavenly Mother; however, it is uncertain whether he meant this literally or metaphorically. The Taiping areas were besieged by Qing forces throughout most of the rebellion. The Qing government defeated the rebellion with the eventual aid of French and British forces.

== Background ==
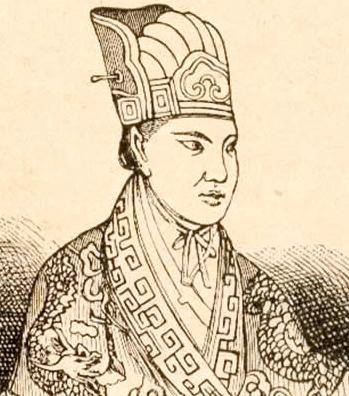
Drawing purported to be of Hong Xiuquan, (Note: According to P. Richard Bohr, this is a Woodblock print of an unidentified Taiping leader.) dated c. 1850

=== History of the ideal of "Great Peace" ===
As a utopian idea, the concept of Great Peace (taiping) dates to Han dynasty Confucian scholars who framed the concept in relation to wise rulers, the satisfaction of the people, the natural order, and cosmic harmony. The concept was further developed in the second century Scripture of the Great Peace which inspired a rebellious Daoist movement. It was also used to designate reigns of prominent emperors and imperial commission-compiled literary collections.

=== Crisis during Qing dynasty ===
During the 19th century, the Qing territories experienced a series of famines, natural disasters, economic problems and defeats at the hands of foreign powers; these events have come to be collectively known as China's century of humiliation. Farmers were heavily overtaxed, rents rose dramatically, and peasants started to desert their lands in droves. The Qing military had recently suffered a disastrous defeat in the First Opium War, while the Chinese economy was severely impacted by a trade imbalance caused by the large-scale and illicit importation of opium. Banditry became more common, and numerous secret societies and self-defence units formed, all of which led to an increase in small-scale warfare.

Protestant missions in China began working from Portuguese Macau, Pazhou, and Guangzhou. Their household staff and the printers they employed corrected and adapted the missionaries' message to reach the Chinese and they began to particularly frequent the prefectural and provincial examinations, where local scholars competed for the chance to rise to power in the imperial civil service. One of the native tracts, Liang Fa's nine-part, 500-page tome called Good Words to Admonish the Age, found its way into the hands of Hong Xiuquan in the mid-1830s. Hong initially leafed through it without interest. After several failures during the examinations and a nervous breakdown, however, Hong told friends and family of a dream in which he was greeted by a golden-haired, bearded man and a younger man whom he addressed as "Elder Brother". He would also declare that he saw Confucius being punished by Hong's celestial father for leading the people astray. Hong worked another six years as a tutor before his brother convinced him that Liang's tract was worth examination. When he read the tract he saw his long-past dream in terms of Christian symbolism: he was the younger brother of Jesus and had met God the Father. He now felt it was his duty to restore the faith in the native Han religion and overthrow the Qing. He was joined by Yang Xiuqing, a former charcoal and firewood salesman of Guangxi, who claimed to act as a voice of the Supreme Emperor.

Feng Yunshan formed the God Worshipping Society in Guangxi after a missionary journey there in 1844 to spread Hong's ideas. In 1847, Hong became the leader of the secret society. The Taiping faith, inspired by missionary Christianity, says one historian, "developed into a dynamic new Chinese religion... Taiping Christianity". Hong presented this religion as a revival and a restoration of the ancient classical faith in Shangdi. The sect's power grew in the late 1840s, initially suppressing groups of bandits and pirates, but persecution by Qing authorities spurred the movement into guerrilla activity, and then into civil war.

In some Marxist historiography, the Taiping Rebellion is viewed as a proto-communist uprising.

== History ==
=== Early establishments ===
The Jintian Uprising began in 1850 in Guangxi. On 11 January 1851 (the 11th day of the first lunar month), incidentally Hong Xiuquan's birthday, Hong declared himself "Heavenly King" of a new dynasty, the "Heavenly Kingdom of Great Peace". After minor clashes, the violence escalated into the uprising in February 1851, in which a 10,000-strong rebel army routed and defeated a smaller Qing force. Feng Yushan was to be the strategist of the rebellion and the administrator of the kingdom during its early days, until his death in 1852.

In 1853, the Taiping forces captured Nanjing, making it their capital and renaming it Tianjing ('heavenly capital'). Hong converted the office of the Viceroy of Liangjiang into his Palace of Heavenly King. Since Hong claimed he had been instructed in his dream to exterminate all Manchu "demons", the rebels set out to kill the entire Manchu population. When Nanjing was occupied, the Taiping rebels went on a rampage, burning 40,000 Manchus to death within the city. They first killed all the Manchu men, and then the Manchu women and Manchu children were burned to ashes.

At its height, the Heavenly Kingdom controlled southern China, centred on the fertile Yangtze River Valley. Control of the river meant that the Taiping could easily supply their capital. From there, the Taiping rebels sent armies west into the upper reaches of the Yangtze, and north to capture Beijing, the capital of the Qing dynasty. The attempt to take Beijing failed.

=== Internal conflict ===
In 1853, Hong withdrew from active control of policies and administration, ruling exclusively by written proclamations often in religious language. Hong disagreed with Yang in certain matters of policy and became increasingly suspicious of Yang's ambitions, his extensive network of spies, and his declarations when "speaking as God". Yang and his family were put to death by Hong's followers in 1856, in an event known as the Tianjing incident. The internal schism significantly weakened Taiping forces.

With their leader largely out of the picture, Taiping delegates tried to widen their popular support with the Chinese middle classes and forge alliances with European powers, but failed on both counts. The Europeans decided to stay neutral. Inside China, the rebellion faced resistance from the traditionalist middle class because of their hostility to Chinese customs and Confucian values. The land-owning upper class, unsettled by the Taiping rebels' peasant mannerisms and their policy of strict separation of the sexes, even for married couples, sided with the Qing forces and their Western allies. Many within the Kingdom who resisted were subjected to torture.

In 1859, Hong Rengan, a cousin of Hong, joined the Taiping Rebellion in Nanjing, and was given considerable power by Hong. He developed an ambitious plan to expand the kingdom's boundaries. In 1860, the Taiping rebels were successful in taking Hangzhou and Suzhou to the east, but failed to take Shanghai, which marked the beginning of the decline of the Kingdom.

=== Fall ===
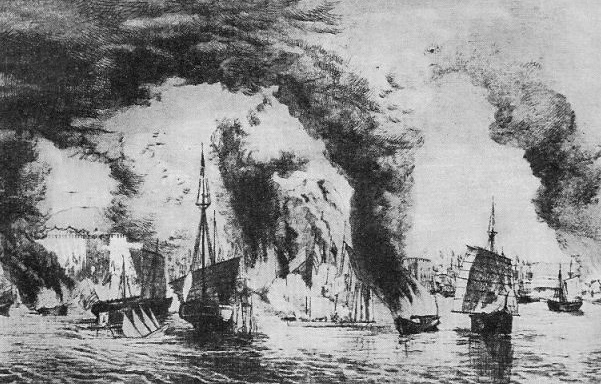
Taiping–Qing naval battle on the Yangtze near Nanjing

An attempt to take Shanghai in August 1860 was initially successful but finally repulsed by a force of Chinese troops and European officers under the command of Frederick Townsend Ward. This army would later become the "Ever Victorious Army", led by Charles "Chinese" Gordon, and would be instrumental in the defeat of the Taiping rebels. Imperial forces were reorganised under the command of Zeng Guofan and Li Hongzhang, and the Qing government's re-conquest began in earnest. By early 1864, Qing control in most areas was well established.

With Qing forces beginning an attack on Nanjing, Hong declared that God would defend the city, but in June 1864, with Qing forces approaching, he died of food poisoning as the result of eating wild vegetables as the city began to run out of food. He was sick for twenty days before the Qing forces could take the city. Although Hong likely died of his illness, suicide by poison has also been suggested. Only a few days after his death Qing forces took control of Nanjing. His body was buried and was later exhumed by Zeng to verify his death, and cremated. Hong's ashes were later blasted out of a cannon in order to ensure that his remains have no resting place as eternal punishment for the uprising.

Four months before the fall of the Taiping Heavenly Kingdom, Hong Xiuquan abdicated in favour of Hong Tianguifu, his eldest son, who was 14 years old then. Hong Tianguifu was unable to do anything to restore the kingdom, so the kingdom was quickly destroyed when Nanjing fell in July 1864 to Qing forces after vicious fighting in the streets. Most of the so-called princes were executed by Qing officials in Jinling Town (金陵城), Nanjing.

Although the fall of Nanjing in 1864 marked the destruction of the Taiping Heavenly Kingdom, there were still several thousands of Taiping rebels continuing to resist Qing forces. It took seven years to finally put down all remnants of the Taiping Rebellion. In August 1871, the last Taiping rebel army, led by Shi Dakai's commander Li Fuzhong (李福忠), was completely wiped out by the Qing forces in the border region of Hunan, Guizhou, and Guangxi.

== Administrative divisions ==
In the Taiping Heavenly Kingdom, there were three levels of local government: province (省), commandery (郡), and county (縣).

According to a regulation promulgated in 1861 (the eleventh year of Taiping Heavenly Kingdom, 太平天囯辛酉十一年), the country were divided into 21 provinces, each with 11 commanderies, except for Jiangnan Province, which had 12 commanderies. However, this was planned for the establishment after the unification of the country, and the establishment during the revolution was not planned in this way. According to existing documents, the Taiping Heavenly Kingdom established five new provinces: Tianjing Province (天京省), Jiangnan Province (江南省), Tianpu Province (天浦省), Sufu Province (蘇福省), and Guifu Province (貴福省). The boundaries of its territory are unknown. The location of Guifu Province is unclear. Tianpu Province, Jiangnan Province, and Sufu Province are all within present-day Jiangsu Province. Tianjing Province included the Taiping Prefecture, which borders Nanjing.

Other provinces mentioned in Taiping Heavenly Kingdom sources are: Anhui, Jiangxi, Hubei, Zhejiang, Hunan, Fujian, Henan, Shandong (珊東), Guangxi, Guangdong, Yunnan, Sichuan, Guizhou, Shaanxi, Gansu, Zuili (罪隸), etc. However, most of them were under the control of the Qing dynasty.

== Kings, princes, and noble ranks ==
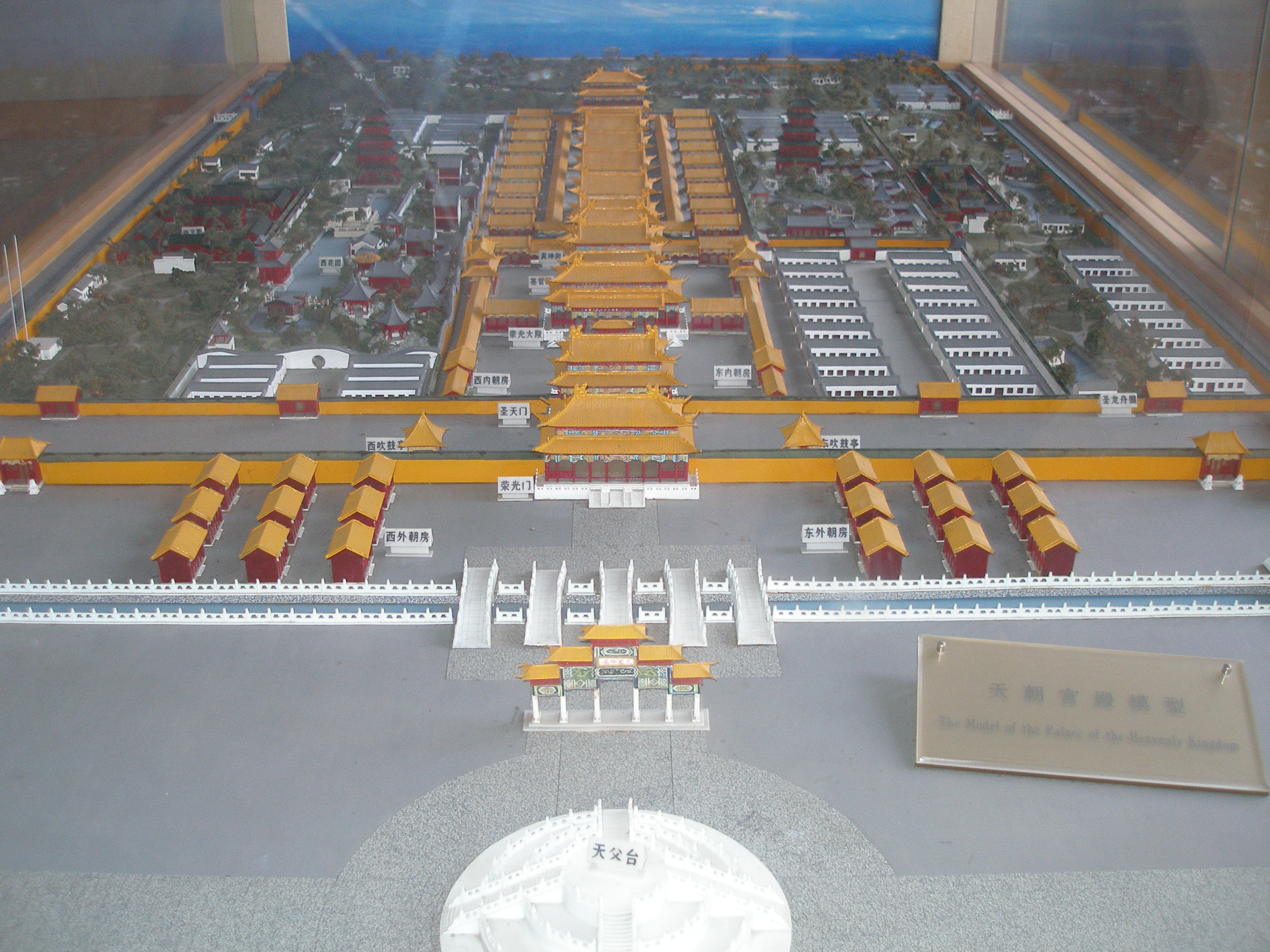
Miniature of the Palace of Heavenly Kingdom in Nanjing

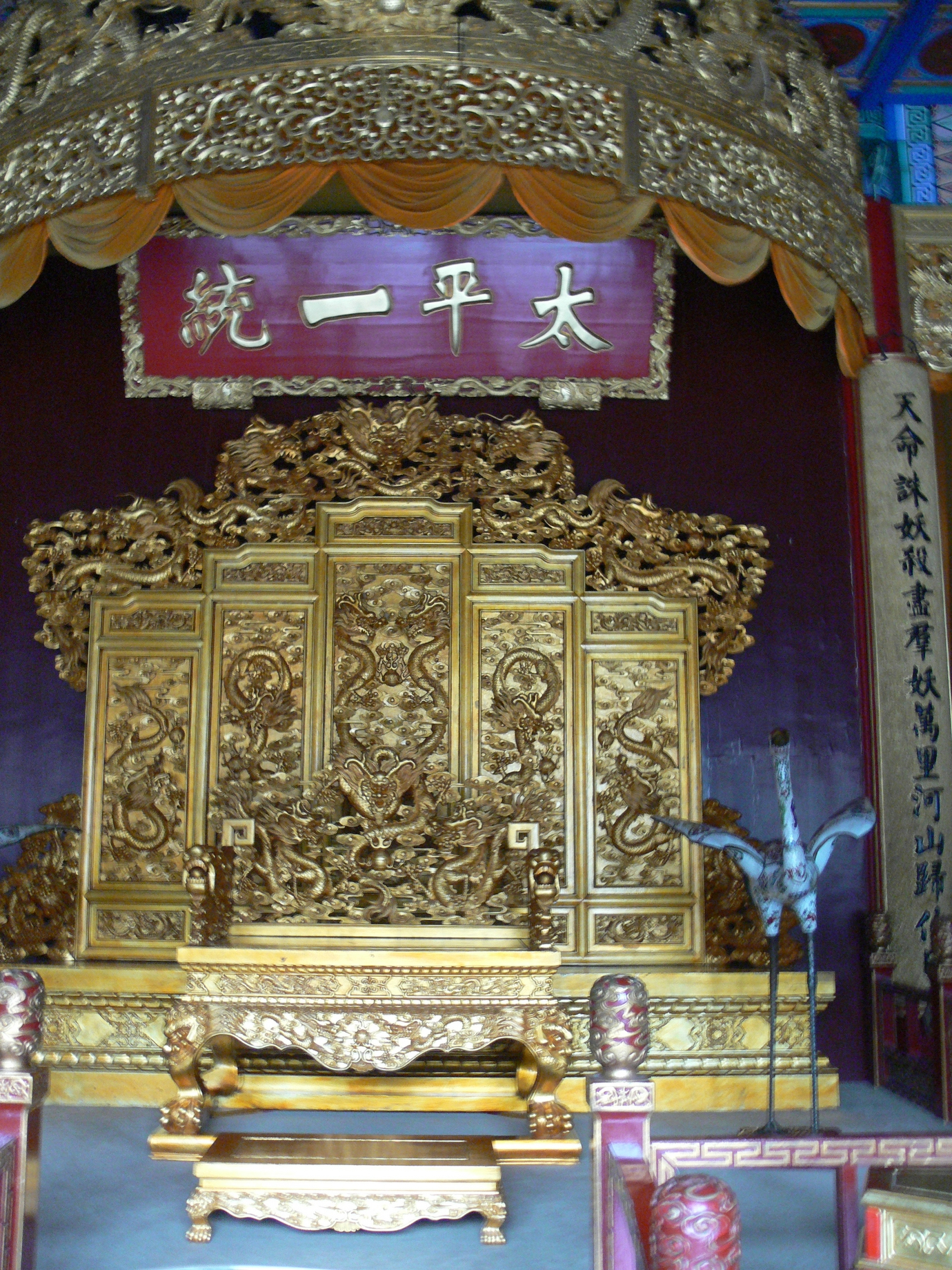
The Heavenly King's throne in Nanjing

The Heavenly King was the highest position in the Heavenly Kingdom. The sole people to hold this position were Hong Xiuquan and his son Hong Tianguifu:

The Taiping Heavenly Kingdom, 1851–1864
| Personal name | Period of reign |
|---|---|
| Hong Xiuquan (洪秀全) | August 1851 – May 1864 |
| Hong Tianguifu (洪天貴福) | May 1864 – August 1864 |

Ranked below the "King of Heaven" Hong Xiuquan, the territory was divided among provincial rulers called kings or princes; initially there were five – the Kings of the Four Cardinal Directions and the Flank King). Of the original rulers, the West King and South King were killed in combat in 1852. The East King was murdered by the North King during a coup in 1856, and the North King himself was subsequently killed. The Kings' names were:

- South King (南王), Feng Yunshan (died 1852)
- East King (東王), Yang Xiuqing (died 1856)
- West King (西王), Xiao Chaogui (died 1852)
- North King (北王), Wei Changhui (died 1856)
- Flank King (翼王), Shi Dakai (captured and executed by Qing forces in 1863)

The later leaders of the movement were 'Princes':

- Zhong Prince (忠王), Li Xiucheng (1823–1864, captured and executed by Qing forces)
- Ying Prince (英王), Chen Yucheng (1837–1862)
- Gan Prince (干王), Hong Rengan (1822–1864; cousin of Hong Xiuquan, executed)
- Jun Prince (遵王), Lai Wenkwok (1827–1868)
- Fu Prince (福王), Hong Renda (洪仁達; Hong Xiuquan's second-eldest brother; executed by Qing forces in 1864)
- Tian Gui (田貴; executed in 1864)

Other princes include:

- An Prince (安王), Hong Renfa (洪仁發), Hong Xiuquan's eldest brother
- Yong Prince (勇王), Hong Rengui (洪仁貴)
- Fu Prince (福王), Hong Renfu (洪仁富)

Leaders of concurrent rebellions were similarly granted the title of King, such Lan Chaozhu, a leader in the Li Yonghe rebellion in Sichuan.

In the later years of the Taiping Rebellion, the territory was divided among many, for a time into the dozens, of provincial rulers called princes, depending on the whims of Hong.

=== Meteorological titles in the Taiping Heavenly Kingdom ===
In the Liang A-fa's Exhortations to Admonish the World《劝世良言, the Holy Spirit was translated as "Holy Spirit Wind"(圣神风). Since Yang Xiuqing was conferred the title of "Holy Spirit Wind", a complete system of other meteorological titles was established accordingly, as detailed below:

‌1. East King Yang Xiuqing‌ was granted the title "Comforter, "Holy Spirit Wind", corresponding to "Wind", he was the exclusive holder of the "Holy Spirit Wind" in the Taiping religious system, symbolizing the moral influence to edify all people; 2. West King Xiao Chaogui‌ was granted the title "Holy Sacred Rain", corresponding to "Rain", in the later period, he additionally took over the title "Holy Sacred Lightning" originally belonging to Shi Dakai, and the combined title became "Holy Sacred Rain and Lightning"; 3. South King Feng Yunshan‌ was granted the title "Cloud Master", corresponding to "Cloud", serving as a core component of the early celestial phenomenon title system; 4. North King Wei Changhui‌ was granted the title "Thunder Master", corresponding to "Thunder", after the Tianjing Incident, Hong Xiuquan transferred this title to Yang Xiuqing, renaming it "Holy Sacred Thunder"; 5. Wing King Shi Dakai‌ was granted the title "Lightning Master", corresponding to "Lightning", after the Tianjing Incident, this title was revoked and reassigned to Xiao Chaogui; 6. Yan King Qin Rigang‌ was granted the title "Frost Master", corresponding to "Frost", acting as a supplementary member of the celestial phenomenon title system; 7. Yu King Hu Yihuang‌ was granted the title "Dew Master", corresponding to "Dew", together with the Yan King, he completed this full sequence of titles.

The original design intention of this set of titles was to compare Hong Xiuquan to the "Sun" that illuminates the world (Hong Xiuquan's imperial jade seal is inscribed with "Heavenly King, Hong the Sun"天王洪日). The various kings, as wind, cloud, rain, thunder, lightning, frost and dew, jointly "spread grace and nurture all living beings". After the Tianjing Incident, Hong Xiuquan made drastic adjustments to this system: he concentrated the core religious authorities of wind, thunder, rain and lightning under the names of Yang Xiuqing and Xiao Chaogui, while the meteorological titles of the other kings were gradually abolished.

== Policies ==
Within the land that it controlled, the Taiping Heavenly Army established totalitarian, theocratic, and highly militarised rule.

- The subject of study for the examinations for officials changed from the Confucian classics to the previous ones to Confucius, based on Chinese folk religion. Bible texts were also included.
- Private property ownership was abolished and all land was held and distributed by the state.
- A solar calendar replaced the lunar calendar, which had previously been endorsed by astronomers of the Qing court.
- Foot binding was banned. (The Hakka people had never followed this tradition, and consequently the Hakka women had always been able to work the fields.)
- Society was declared classless and the sexes were declared equal. For the first time in Chinese history, civil service exams were held for women. Fu Shanxiang, an educated woman from Nanjing, passed them and became an official at the court of the Eastern King.
- Several women served as military officers and commanders under Taiping: Hong Xuanjiao (sister of Taiping leader), Su Sanniang and Qiu Ersao are examples of women who acted actively as leaders during the Taiping Rebellion.
- Families were rigorously separated. There were separate army units consisting of women only with female Taiping supervisors; until 1855, not even married couples were allowed to live together or have sexual relations. Children were also taken away from their families and forcefully adopted by high-ranked military figures.
- The Qing-dictated queue hairstyle was abandoned in favour of wearing the hair long.
- Commoners in Nanjing were asked to set up altars consisting three cups of tea in their homes as a sign of obedience
- Other new laws were promulgated including the prohibition of opium, gambling, tobacco, alcohol, polygamy and concubinage, slavery, and prostitution. These all carried death penalties.

=== Hong Rengan's proposed reforms ===
Prince Hong Rengan, with the approval of his cousin the Heavenly King, advocated several new policies, including:

- Promoting the adoption of railways by granting patents for the introduction of locomotives; 21 railways were planned for each of the 21 provinces.
- Promoting the adoption of steamships for commerce and defence.
- Establishment of currency-issuing private banks.
- Granting of 10-year patents for introduction of new inventions, 5-year for minor items.
- Establishment of a National Postal Service.
- Promoting mineral exploration by granting control and twenty per cent of the revenue to the discoverers of deposits.
- Introduction of governmental investigative officers.
- Introduction of independent impartial state media officers for reporting and disseminating news.
- Institution of district treasuries and paymasters to manage finances.

=== Military procurement ===
While the Taiping rebels did not have the support of Western governments, they were relatively modernised in terms of weapons. An ever growing number of Western weapons dealers and black marketeers sold Western weapons such as modern muskets, rifles, and cannons to the rebels. As early as 1853, Taiping Tianguo soldiers had been using guns and ammunition sold by Westerners. Rifles and gunpowder were smuggled into China by English and American traders as "snuff and umbrellas". They were partially equipped with surplus equipment sold by various Western companies and military units' stores, both small arms and artillery. One shipment of weaponry from an American dealer in April 1862 already "well known for their dealings with rebels" was listed as 2,783 (percussion cap) muskets, 66 carbines, 4 rifles, and 895 field artillery guns, as well as carrying passports signed by the Loyal King. Almost two months later, a ship was stopped with 48 cases of muskets, and another ship with 5,000 muskets. Mercenaries from the West also joined the Taiping forces, though most were motivated by opportunities for plunder during the rebellion rather than joining for ideological reasons. The Taiping forces constructed iron foundries where they were making heavy cannons, described by Westerners as vastly superior to Qing cannons. Just before his execution, Taiping Loyal King Li Xiucheng advised his enemies that war with the Western powers was coming and the Qing must buy the best Western cannons and gun carriages, and have the best Chinese craftsmen learn to build exact copies, teaching other craftsmen as well.

=== Religious affairs ===
Initially, the followers of Hong Xiuquan were called God Worshippers. Hong's faith was inspired by visions he reported in which the Heavenly Father greeted him in Heaven. Hong had earlier been in contact with Protestant missionaries and read the Bible. The Taiping Heavenly Kingdom was based on Hong Xiuquan's syncretism with Christianity, which differed from mainstream Christian prayers, rituals, and holidays. The libraries of the Buddhist monasteries were destroyed, almost completely in the case of the Yangtze Delta. Temples of Daoism, Confucianism, and other traditional beliefs were expropriated to be used for the new religion, as schools or hospitals, or simply defaced.

In letters to missionary Joseph Edkins, Hong rejected the Nicene Creed and said Arius was correct.

=== Contrast from Confucian values ===
The Qing dynasty, having lasted nearly 200 years, was deeply rooted in Confucian values. Since the Taiping Heavenly Kingdom's origin was influenced by Christianity, these policies listed above reflect a drastic shift away from Confucianism. Hong Xiuquan's knowledge of Christianity was acquired through a Chinese Christian convert, Liang Fa's tract: Good Words to Admonish the Age, so Xiuquan's understanding was not necessarily aligned to traditional Christian values. Regardless, the destruction of social classes is in opposition to the Confucian Five Bonds principle, which is essentially a hierarchy of relationships. In particular, there was a strong value places on the dominance of husband over wife. Likewise, women were generally considered inferior to men in Qing society. Civil Service Examinations were exclusively available to men, and since the exam was intended to create a meritocracy system, treating all classes as equal also undermined the Confucian principle of hierarchical merit. Treating genders as equal was radical in comparison to Qing social order, which sought to maintain patriarchy through the enforcement of principles such as the Three Obediences and Four Virtues, and foot-binding, among other restrictions.

As the Chinese scholar-official, Zhang Runan, cites in his eyewitness account of the Taiping seizure of the city of Nanjing in 1853, families were separated and children were forcefully adopted by Taiping soldiers. Runan reports that entire families would commit suicide in order to evade the separation. The Taiping's separation of families, husband from wife, and children from parents, was a violation of Confucian ethics. The value of family is a cornerstone of Confucianism as reflected in the principle of filial piety. Filial piety stresses the specific relationship between child and parent, as children have a duty to their parents and elders. Consequently, the separation of families under the Taiping, specifically the practice of having children adopted into other families, disrupted these sacred relationships. As demonstrated, Taiping governance and policies represented a far-reaching attempted transition and contrast from Qing governance and Confucian-influenced social order in China.

=== Foreign affairs ===
The Heavenly Kingdom maintained the concept of the imperial Chinese tributary system in mandating all of the "ten thousand nations in the world" to submit and make the annual tribute missions to the Heavenly Court. The Heavenly King proclaimed that he intended to establish a new dynasty of China.

=== Clothing and dress-code ===
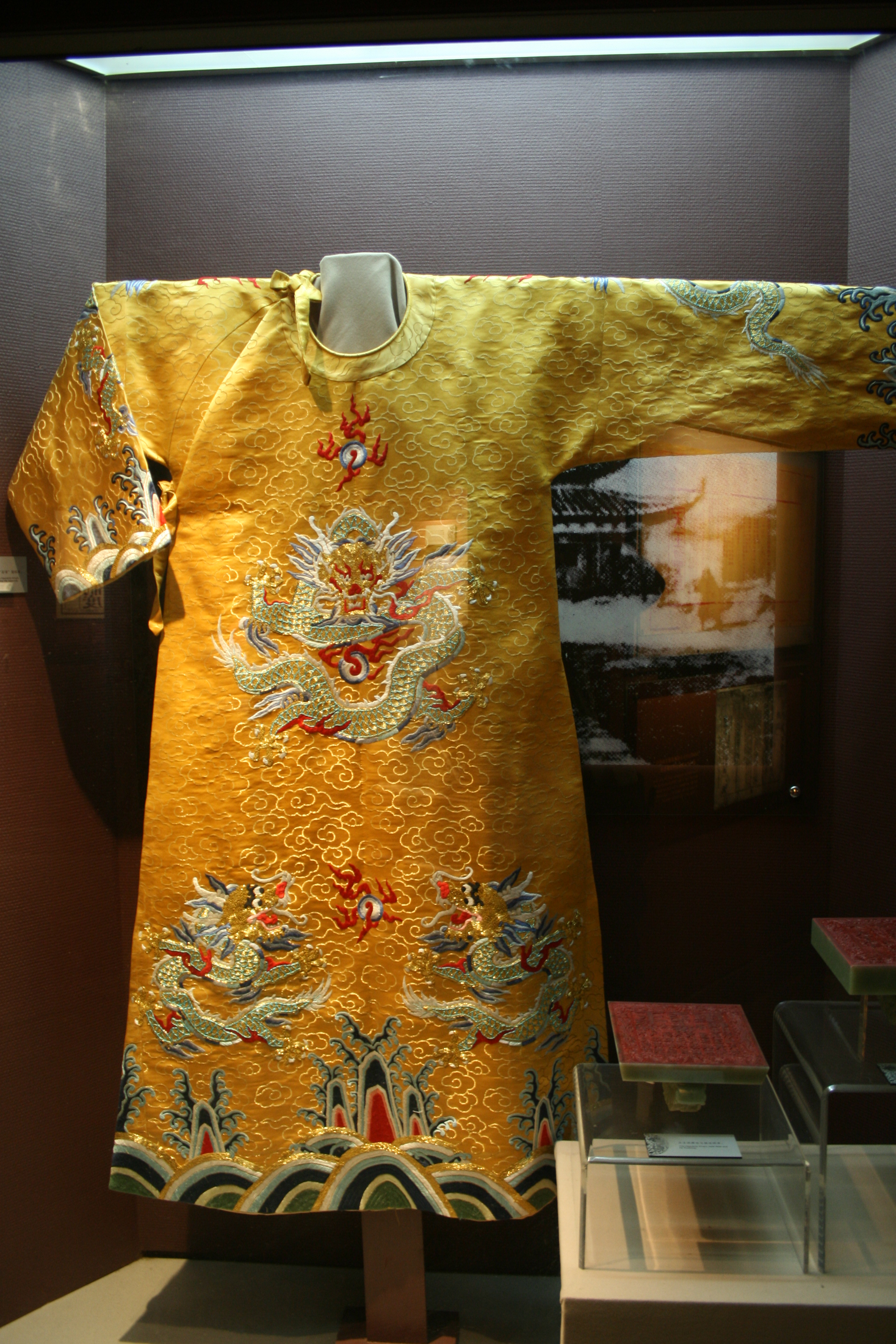
Hong Xiuquan's Silk Dragon

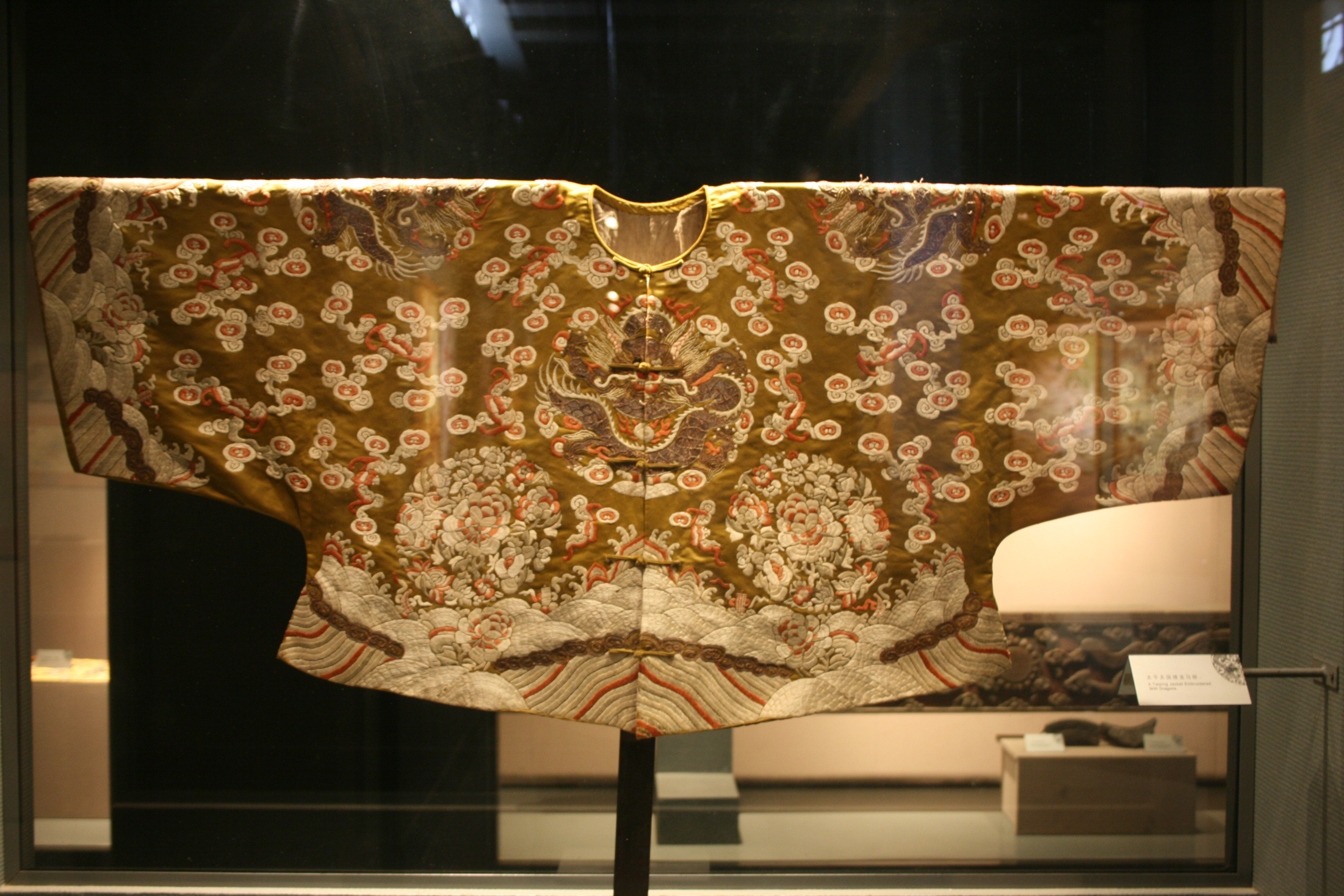
Taiping silk magua-jacket.

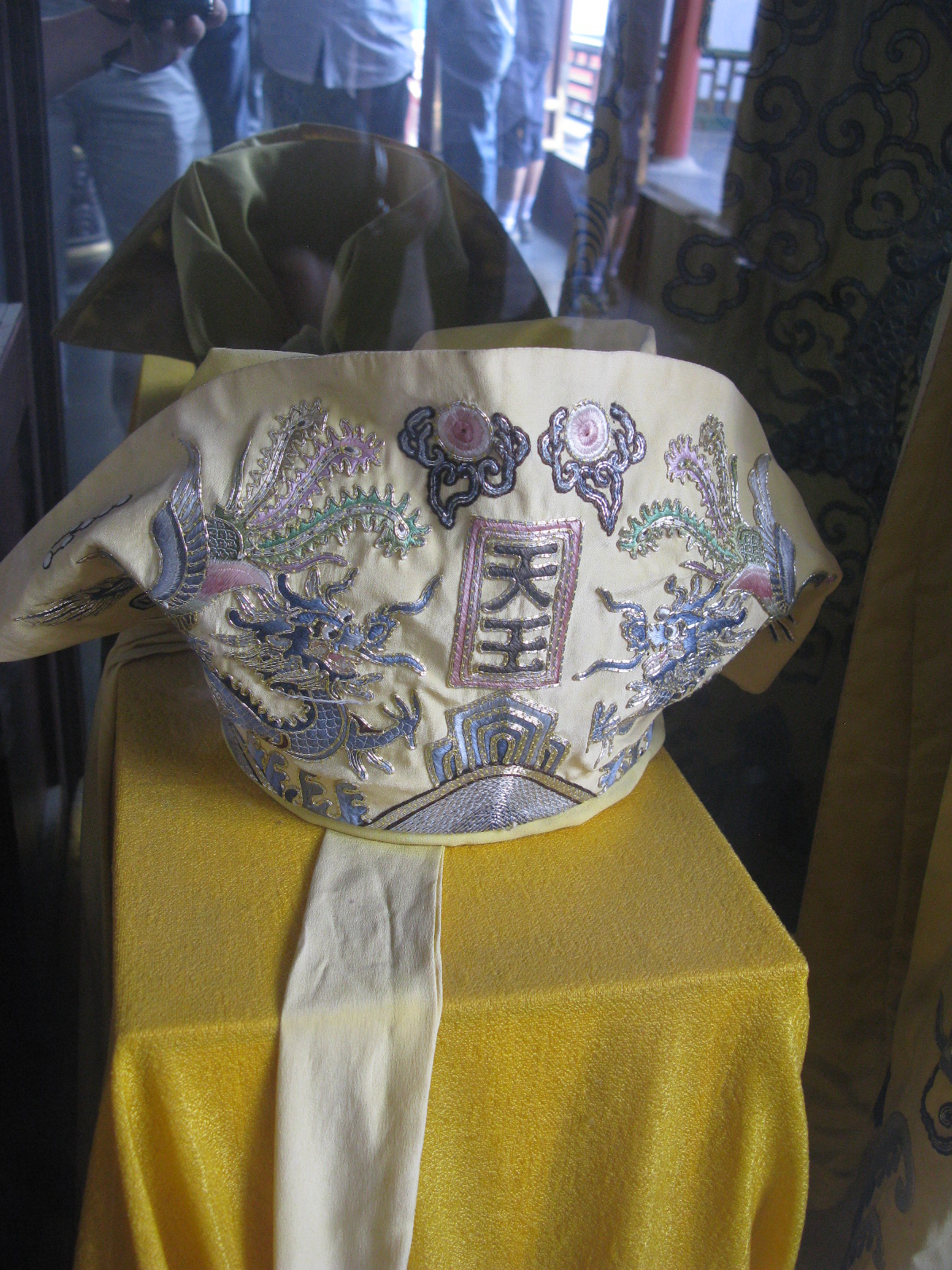
The Heavenly Hat (天帽) of Hong Xiuquan

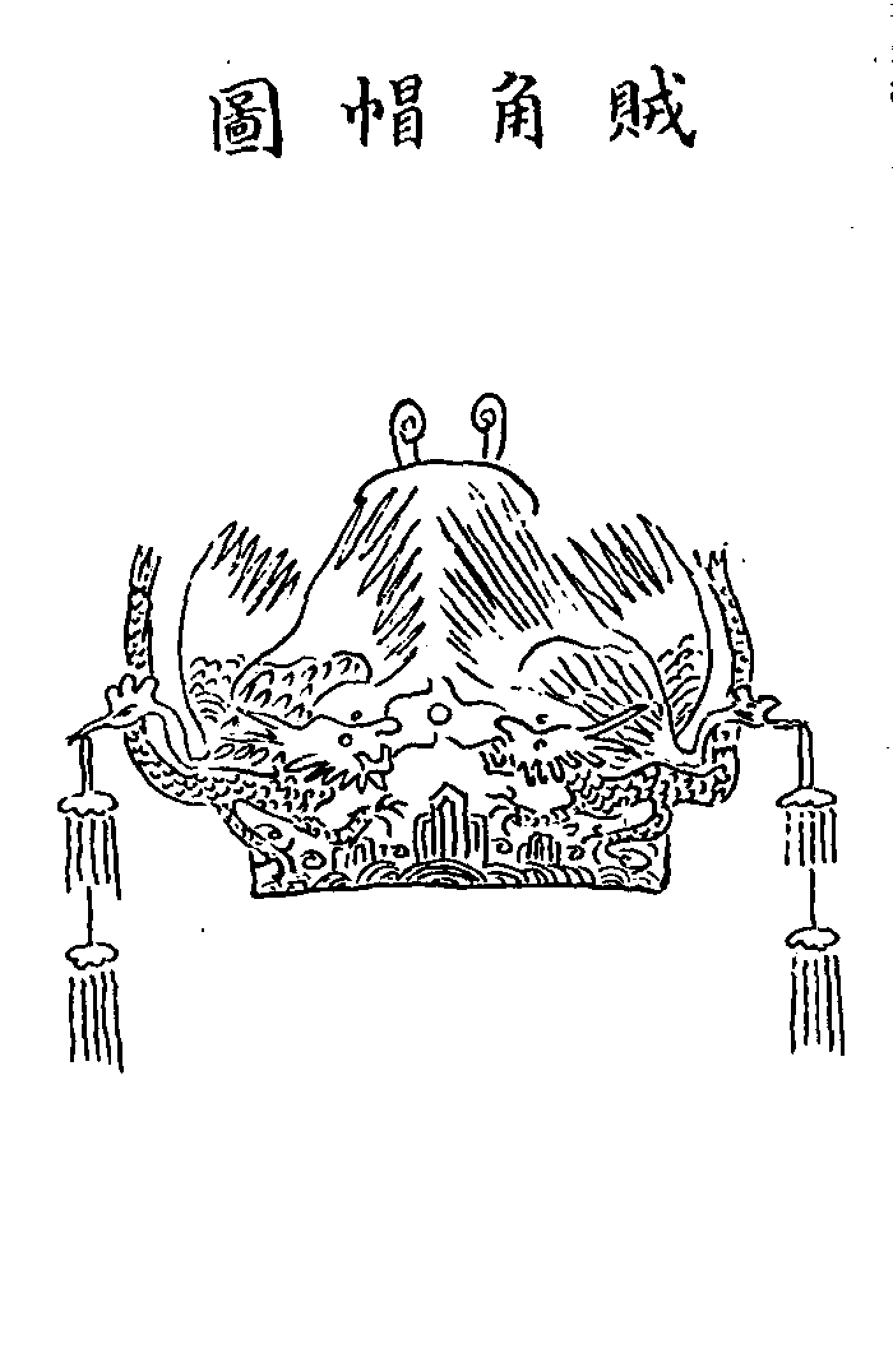
Qing illustration of Jiaomao-hat (角帽) of the Taiping Rebellion.

The Taiping Heavenly Kingdom developed its own regulated system of clothing and fashion, in response to the cultural policy of tifayifu set by the Qing. Taiping formed many offices dedicated to art and craftsmanship, such as the "Fengyi ya" also known as "Dianpao ya" ("Clothes sewing/Ceremonial gown office", 縫衣衙/典袍衙), "Guomao ya" or ("National hats office", 國帽衙) and "Xiujin ya" ("Brocade Embroidery Office", 繡錦衙), that were chiefly in charge of creating new clothing for the Taiping.

One of the earliest acts of rebellion was Taiping members letting their hairs grow and forbade the use of queue braids. Because of this, the Qing often called the Taiping rebels as "long-haired bandits" (長毛賊), "hair bandits/rebels" (毛賊, 髮逆), or as "Yue (Cantonese) bandits" (粵匪). Equality of sexes in the Heavenly Kingdom also saw women's clothing forego the use of skirts, with a preference to trousers worn together with wide shirts with slimmer sleeves and lack of collars. Many women also forego the use of shoes, preferring to march barefoot, as a sign for the banning of foot-binding, which is inherited from Hakka women's aversion to foot-binding. Characteristics of Manchu clothing such as the matixiu, or horse-hoof cuffs, and Qing dynasty's official uniforms and headwear were forbidden and replaced with Taiping's own clothing similarly informed by Hakka fashion, with the goal of restoring Han Chinese identity as the Heavenly Kingdom abhorred and opposed the use of qizhuang, with Taiping leaders Yang Xiaoqing and Xiao Chaogui indicting the Manchu-Qing for "replacing the dress of the Chinese with those of barbarians" and "making the people lose their ancestral roots, transforming them into animals".

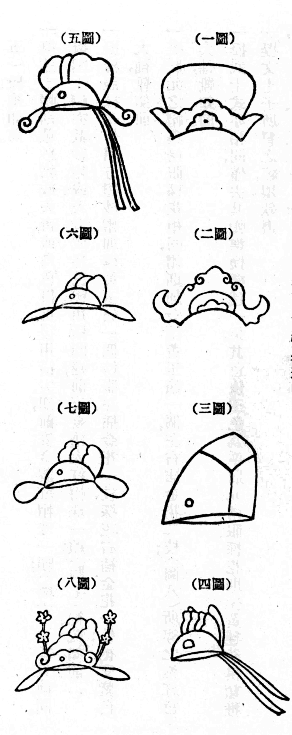
Designs for official headwear of the Taiping Heavenly Kingdom, from Qinding shijietiaoli (欽定士階條例).

In place of the hats of the Manchu, Taiping members wore headscarves or turbans and rattan hats. Heavenly Kingdom also developed its own headwear, such as the fengmao (風帽), jiaomao (角帽), and liangmao (涼帽), worn in accordance to rank and ceremony. Similarly, a plan was outlined for official headwear and colors of clothing for scholars graduating from Heavenly Kingdom's imperial examination in Qinding shijietiaoli (欽定士階條例) by Hong Rengan.

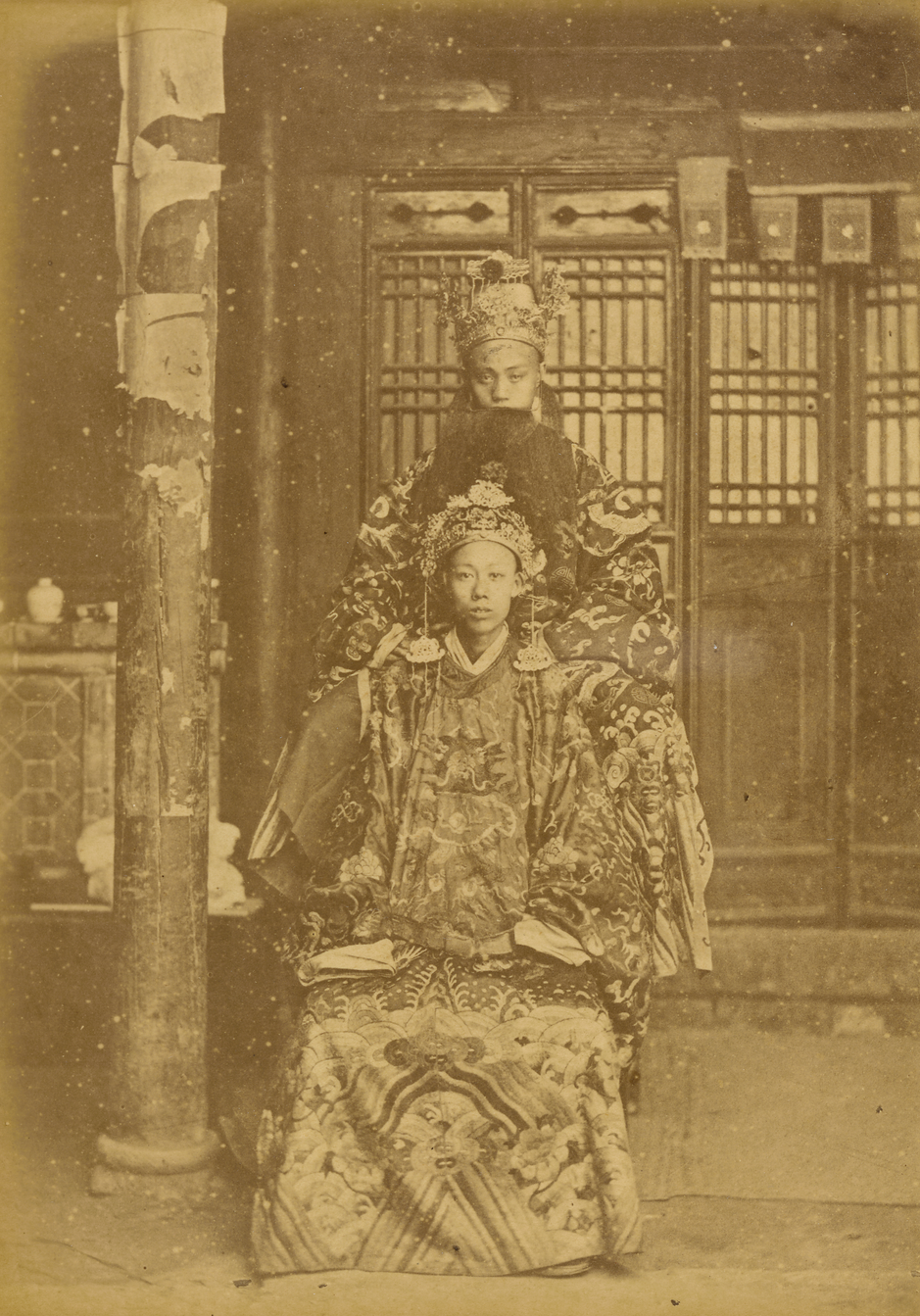
Two actors in Chinese opera costumes in 1874.

The official clothing of the Heavenly Kingdom used opera costumes as its foundation, with instances of Taiping rebels confiscating opera costumes during their attacks and leaders wearing costumes for various occasions, due to the opera costumes being exempt from the policy of tifayifu and retaining the hanfu-style, which distanced itself from qizhuang. Even the kings of Heavenly Kingdom wore paofu that were repurposed or based on the paofu from opera stages. However, because the Taiping Heavenly Kingdom had a limited understanding for prior hanfu fashions, many of their official clothing still retained similarities to qizhuang, such as the use of magua-jackets for military uniforms.

Qing variant of the mangfu was similarly kept, with only the horse-hoof sleeves removed. The kings and princes of the Heavenly Kingdom similarly wore yellow dragon robes, with the number of dragons embroidered as symbols of their rank and station. The highest ranking King of Heaven had 40 dragons on his robes, the East and West Kings having 36, North and South had 32, the Flank King having 30, and the Yan and Yue Princes had 24 dragons. The officials of lower rank wore red and blue. The colors and patterns for various headwear and other clothing were also regulated according to rank, but due to the disorganisation and contradictory rules and records the exact practice of uniform regulation is difficult to examine.

=== Currency ===
In its first year, the Taiping Heavenly Kingdom minted coins that were 23 mm × 26 mm (0.91 in × 1.02 in) in diameter, weighing around 4.1 g (0.14 oz). The kingdom's name was inscribed on the obverse and "Holy Treasure" (聖寶) on the reverse; the kingdom also issued paper notes.

== Subsequent massacre of the Hakkas ==
With the collapse of the Taiping Heavenly Kingdom, the Qing dynasty launched waves of massacres against the Hakka, killing 30,000 Hakkas each day throughout China during the height of the Hakka massacres. Similar purges were taken while defeating the Red Turban Rebellion (1854–1856). In Guangdong, Governor Ye Mingchen oversaw the execution of 70,000 people in Guangzhou, eventually one million people were killed throughout central Guangdong. Another major impact was the bloody Punti–Hakka Clan Wars (1855 and 1867), which would cause the deaths of a million people.

== See also ==
- Millenarianism in colonial societies
