= Jintian Uprising =

1851 revolt in China

- Part of the Taiping Rebellion
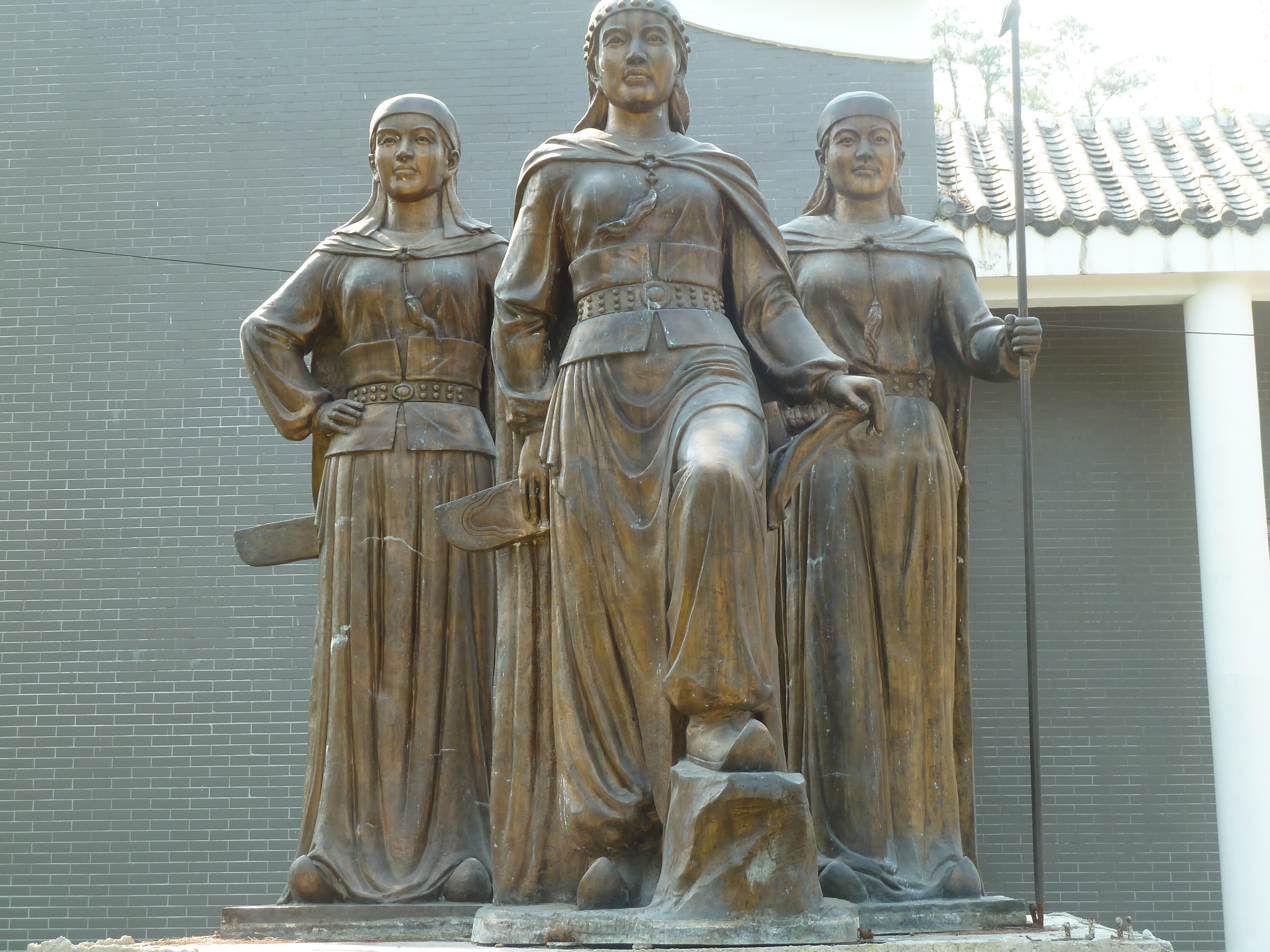
- The Jintian Uprising Site in the village of Jintian in Jintian Town, Guiping is where Hong Xiuquan and his followers officially launched the Jintian Uprising.
Date	11 January 1851
Location	Jintian, Guiping, Guangxi, China
Result	Taiping victory: Beginning of the Taiping Rebellion

Belligerents
Qing dynasty	Taiping Heavenly Kingdom

Commanders and leaders
(Qing dynasty) Zhou Fengqi (Qing dynasty) Li Dianyuan (Qing dynasty) Iktambu †	Hong Xiuquan

Strength
7,000+	20,000+

Casualties and losses
1,000+	Unknown

Jintian Uprising
- Traditional Chinese: 金田起義
- Simplified Chinese: 金田起义
Transcriptions
Standard Mandarin
- Hanyu Pinyin: Jīntián Qǐyì

The Jintian Uprising was an armed revolt formally declared by Hong Xiuquan, founder and leader of the God Worshippers, on 11 January 1851 during the late Qing dynasty of China. The uprising was named after the rebel base in Jintian, a town in Guangxi within present-day Guiping. It marked the beginning of the Taiping Rebellion.

== Background ==
In 1843 Hong Xiuquan, Feng Yunshan and Hong Rengan founded the God Worshipping Society, a syncretic sect mixing Protestant Christianity and Chinese folk religion, in Hua County (花縣; present-day Huadu District, Guangdong). The following year they traveled to Guangxi to spread their teachings to the peasant population. After that, Hong Xiuquan returned to Guangdong to write about his beliefs, while Feng Yunshan remained in the Mount Zijing (紫荊山) area to rally people like Yang Xiuqing and Xiao Chaogui to join their sect.

== Preparations ==
Around 1849, a famine broke out in Guangxi and the Tiandihui (Heaven and Earth Society) rose in rebellion against the ruling Qing dynasty.

In February 1850, a local corps passed through a number of God Worshipping villages and threatened to kill the converts. In response, Feng Yunshan began to call for open revolt by the God Worshippers. In July 1850, the God Worshippers' leaders directed their followers to converge in Jintian and quickly amassed a force of 10,000–30,000 people. In preparation for an uprising, Hong organized these men into military formations, each led by commanders with military ranks: a marshal (軍帥) commanded five divisional marshals (師帥); each divisional marshal commanded five brigade marshals (旅帥); each brigade marshal commanded five infantry chiefs (卒長); each infantry chief commanded four majors (兩司馬); each major commanded five company leaders (伍長); each company leader had four soldiers under him. The total number of officers and enlisted personnel reached 13,155 by the end of that month, and civilian ranks were also created to govern the remaining civilian population.

The Qing imperial army in Guangxi was not particularly strong, with only about 30,000 troops, and was occupied with suppressing the Tiandihui's rebellion. Hong Xiuquan and his followers were able to build their forces without being noticed by the government.

== Opening moves ==
In the 12th lunar month of 1850, Li Dianyuan (李殿元), the Qing army commander at Xunzhou, led his troops to surround one of Hong Xiuquan's residences in Huazhoushanren Village (花洲山人村), Pingnan County (平南縣) in an attempt to eradicate the rebels. However, Hong Xiuquan and Feng Yunshan were saved by reinforcements sent by Yang Xiuqing, and they returned to Jintian. On the 1st day of the 1st lunar month of 1851, an imperial force commanded by Zhou Fengqi (周鳳歧) and his deputies Li Dianyuan and Iktambu (伊克坦布) launched an offensive on Jintian. However, the rebels anticipated the attack and had set up an ambush near Siwang Dyke (思旺圩) and Caijiang Village (蔡江村), five kilometers away from Jintian. The government troops were defeated by the rebels and Iktambu was killed.

== The uprising ==
On the 11th day of the first lunar month of 1851, which was also Hong Xiuquan's birthday, the God Worshipping Society proclaimed the uprising at Jintian, declaring the formation of the Taiping Heavenly Kingdom.

Five rules for its military were stated:

- Follow orders
- Men and women are to be segregated during movement
- Do not commit any mistake
- Be fair and harmonious
- Cooperate and do not withdraw during battle

The rebels changed their garments, kept their hair long (the men previously had to wear their hair in a queue in accordance with Qing law), and tied a red cloth around their heads. On the 13th day, they headed to Dahuangjiangkou (大湟江口).

== Subsequent clashes ==
As the rebels moved southeastward, Tiandihui rebels totaling more than 2,000 led by Gen. Luo Dagang (羅大綱) and Su Sanniang (蘇三娘) joined Hong Xiuquan. In the meantime, Qing official Li Xingyuan (李星沅) ordered Gen. Xiang Rong to lead 2,000 men to attack the rebels, with an additional support force of 1,000 from Guizhou. On the 18th day of the 2nd lunar month of 1851, Xiang Rong was joined by other imperial armies led by Gen. Li Nengchen (李能臣) and Gen. Zhou Fengqi, and they attacked Dahuangjiangkou simultaneously from east to west. However, they entered minefields set up by the rebels and were ambushed, sustaining several hundred casualties. The government forces were forced to stop their offensive and adopt a siege tactic instead.

The rebels withdrew under the cover of darkness on the night of the 10th day of the 3rd lunar month to East Village (東鄉), Wuxuan County. The imperial troops gave chase but were ambushed again. Both sides reached a stalemate near Sanli Dyke (三里圩). On the 23rd day Hong Xiuquan declared himself the "Heavenly King" (天王) in East Village. On the 3rd day of the 4th lunar month Guangxi governor Zhou Tianjue (周天爵) and Xiang Rong rallied over 6,000 troops to attack East Village but were driven back by the rebels. After suffering continual defeats, Li Xingyuan died on the 12th day of the 5th lunar month. Four days later the rebels broke out of the siege and advanced towards Xiangzhou (象州). Qing forces pursued them while the newly deployed 1,000-strong imperial army from Guangzhou led by Gen. Ulantai (烏蘭泰) was stationed at Liangshan Village (梁山村). Xiang Rong's force was deployed to Jie Ridge (界嶺) to block the rebels' route to the north.

At the battle of Du'ao Ridge (獨鰲嶺; located north of Liangshan Village), Wulantai's army was badly mauled by rebel forces. However, as the government troops possessed a geographical advantage, they were able to deflect attempts by the rebels to break out of the encirclement. By the seventh lunar month the rebels were forced to withdraw from Xiangzhou to their original base at Mt. Zijing (紫荊山), Guiping. Although the rebels' northward expedition plan failed to materialize, they did succeed in attracting huge numbers of the lower classes to join them and obtained a large amount of supplies. This marked the beginning of the Taiping Rebellion.

== See also ==
- Monument to the People's Heroes
