= Jintian, Guangxi =

Town in Guiping, Guangxi, China

Jintian 金田镇
- Town
- Interactive map of Jintian
- Location in Guangxi Jintian (China)
- Coordinates: 23°35′15″N 110°06′58″E
- Country: People's Republic of China
- Autonomous Region: Guangxi

Population
  - Total: 9,000
- Time zone: UTC+8 (China Standard)

Jintian (Chinese: 金田镇) is a town in Guiping, Guangxi. It currently has a population of around 9,000. It was the location of the 1851 Jintian uprising, the beginning of the Taiping Rebellion. Jintian is also the name of one of the villages within Jintian Town. The township has a large population of Hakka people.
