= Taiping Prefecture =

Administrative division of Ming and Qing China

Location of Taiping Prefecture in Anhui Province, 1820

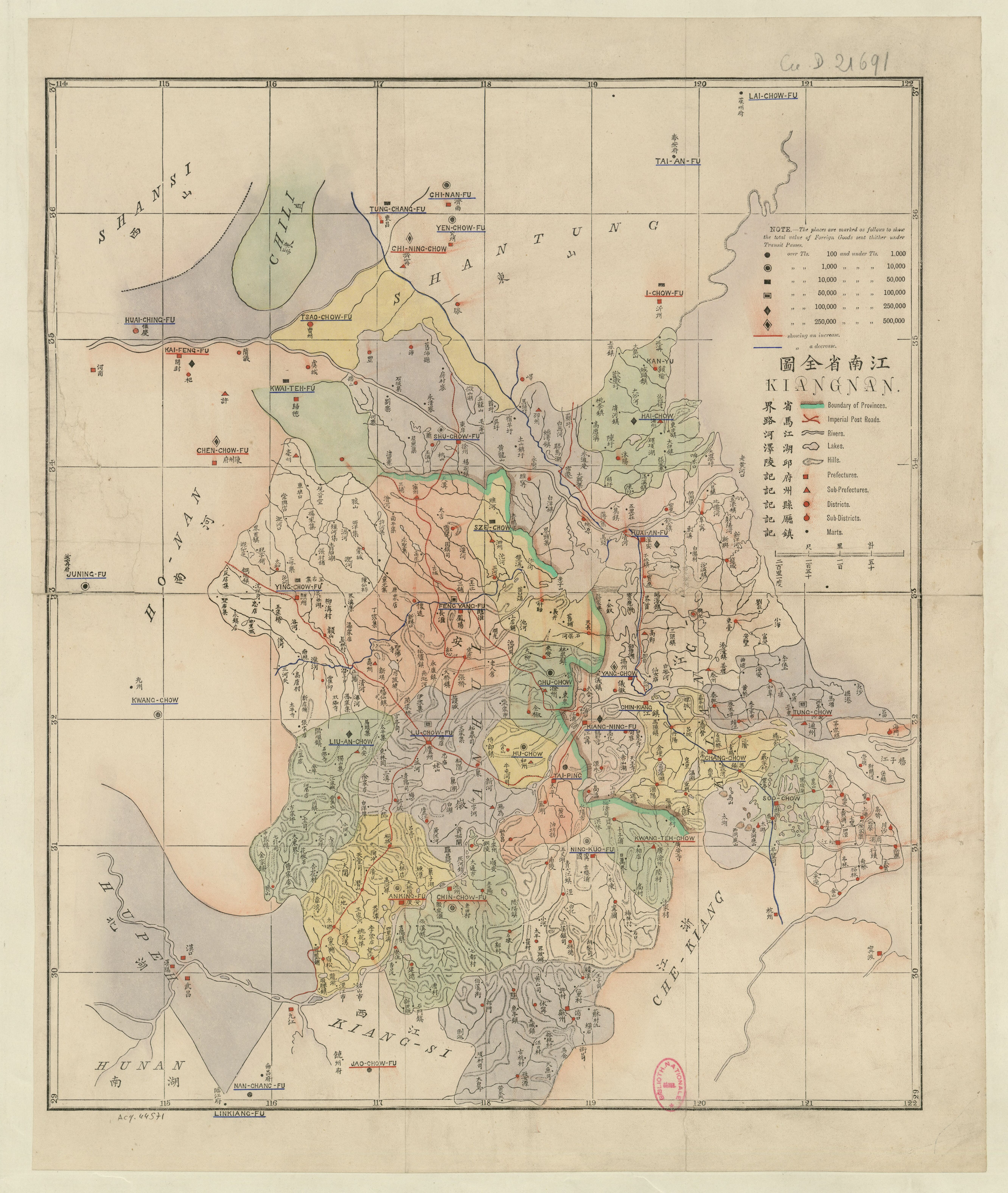
The prefecture shown in an 1880 map, immediately southwest of Nanjing (then known as Kiangning)

Taiping Prefecture (Chinese: 太平府; pinyin: Tàipíng Fǔ) was an administrative region of China during the Ming (1368–1644) and Qing (1644–1911) dynasties that spanned roughly the areas of the modern day cities of Ma'anshan and Wuhu in Anhui Province. During the Ming dynasty the prefecture was classified as part of Southern Zhili and later came under the administration of Anhui Province during the Qing dynasty. Taiping Prefecture consisted of the three counties of Dangtu, Wuhu, and Fanchang. It was abolished in 1912 with the advent of the Republic of China.
