= Luo Ergang =

Chinese historian and researcher

- Born: January 29, 1901; Guigang, Guangxi
- Died: May 25, 1997 (aged 96); Beijing, China
- Political party: Chinese Communist Party

Luo Ergang (simplified Chinese: 罗尔纲; traditional Chinese: 羅爾綱; January 29, 1901 – May 25, 1997), also known as Elgan Lo and Lo Erh-kang, was a historian and researcher at the Institute of Modern History of Chinese Academy of Social Sciences (中国社会科学院近代史研究所). He was an authority on the Taiping Rebellion from a left-wing perspective.

== Biography ==
Born in Gui County (now Guigang, Guangxi) on January 29, 1901, Luo studied history under Professor Hu Shih at Peking University.

In December 1950, Luo Ergang began to prepare for the construction of the Taiping Heavenly Kingdom Memorial Hall (太平天国纪念馆), which was established in October 1956 (later renamed as the Taiping Heavenly Kingdom History Museum).

In 1958, he joined the Chinese Communist Party.

He died of illness in Beijing on May 25, 1997.

== Works ==
- Luo Ergang (1991). History of the Taiping Heavenly Kingdom. Zhonghua Book Company. ISBN 978-7-101-00393-2.
- Luo Ergang (2006). Five Years at the Master's Gates: Trivial Notes on Hu Shi. Life, Reading, New Knowledge Joint Publishing Company. ISBN 978-7-108-02564-7.
- Luo Ergang (2013). Outline of the History of the Taiping Heavenly Kingdom. Yuelu Press. ISBN 978-7-5538-0038-7.
