= Hong Tianguifu =

King of the Taiping Heavenly Kingdom (1849–1864)

Taiping Heavenly King
- Reign: 2 June 1864 – 18 November 1864
- Coronation: 6 June 1864
- Predecessor: Hong Xiuquan
- Successor: Kingdom abolished
- Born: Hong Tiangui (洪貴 (Note: Note that the character uses the traditional printed form of 天 with a longer upper stroke. This is similar to the Japanese ten 天, but Unicode does not offer support as separate character, instead only displaying the Japanese version when Chinese functionality is disabled.)); 23 November 1849; Guanlubu, Guangdong, Qing Empire
- Died: 18 November 1864 (aged 14); Nanchang, Jiangxi, Qing Empire
- Spouse: Wang; Wang; Hou; Zhang
Names
- Hong Tianguifu 洪貴福
Era name and dates
- 太平囯: 6 June 1864 – 18 November 1864
- House: Hong
- Father: Hong Xiuquan
- Mother: Lai Lianying (賴蓮英)

Hong Tianguifu
- Traditional Chinese: 洪天貴福
- Simplified Chinese: 洪天贵福
Transcriptions
Standard Mandarin
- Hanyu Pinyin: Hóng Tiānguìfú

Birth name
- Traditional Chinese: 洪天貴
- Simplified Chinese: 洪天贵
Transcriptions
Standard Mandarin
- Hanyu Pinyin: Hóng Tiānguì

Hong Tianguifu (23 November 1849 – 18 November 1864) was the second and last king of the Taiping Heavenly Kingdom. He is popularly referred to as the Junior Lord (幼主). Officially, like his father Hong Xiuquan, he was the King of Heaven (天王). To differentiate, he is also called the Junior King of Heaven (幼天王).

== History ==
Hong Tianguifu was born in Guanlubu village in Hua County (present-day Huadu District), Guangdong. Initially given the first name Tiangui (天貴; "Heaven's Precious"), his father added an additional character (福; "happiness/"blessing") around 1860, making his name unusual, as Chinese given names typically have only one or two characters. The name change came amid Hong Xiuquan's increased focus on mysticism and belief that his son was fit to replace him as "worldly leader". In the kingdom's hierarchy, Hong Tianguifu was referred to as "The Young Monarch of 10,000 years", mirroring his father's title "Heavenly King, Lord of 10,000 years".

Hong Tianguifu succeeded his father on 2 June 1864, a day after his father's death, at age fourteen. He was not respected like his father by the kingdom's princes and was spoken of poorly. In Li Xiucheng's autobiography, written shortly before Li's execution, Tianguifu was described as "inexperienced", "spoiled" and "incapable". Tianguifu also never rode a horse, which was essential for leaders and commanders in wars.

On 19 July 1864, six weeks after Hong Tianguifu's coronation, the Qing government captured Tianjing, the capital of the Taiping rebels. Aided by Li Xiucheng, Tianguifu escaped to Dongba, Jiangsu, disguised in Qing Army uniforms. Hong Tianguifu's two younger brothers were killed during the clashes. They rendezvoused with his uncle Hong Rengan and first went to Guangde County, Anhui, before heading to the town of Huzhou, Zhejiang on 13 August 1864, where they rendezvoused with the local Taiping Army commander Huang Wenjin (黃文金). The Qing government sent Zuo Zongtang and Li Hongzhang to attack the town. The Taiping Army commander in charge of defending the southern gate of the town, Chen Xueming (陳學明), surrendered on 26 August 1864. Hong Tianguifu, Hong Rengan and Huang Wenjin were forced to flee from the town the next day, under the cover of night. Huang Wenjin soon died of his wounds. The rest of the survivors attempted to escape to the border region of Jiangxi and Fujian to join the remnant Taiping forces led by Li Shixian. However, on 9 October 1864, they were ambushed by the Qing army at Shicheng. Hong Tianguifu escaped to the mountains near Shicheng after his token force was wiped out, but he was caught on 25 October 1864 by Qing soldiers searching for him. Hong Rengan was captured and subsequently executed on 23 November 1864 at Nanchang, Jiangxi.

While being escorted by guards, Hong Tianguifu had a conversation with a Qing army soldier named Tang Jiatong. Hong first talked about his relationship with his father and others. He said, "The old affairs (Note: Referring to the rebellion and similar transgressions against the Qing dynasty) of the Taiping Heavenly Kingdom were done by my father and Hong Renxuan, he sat on the throne. What did it have to do with me? Even after ascending the throne, I did nothing that is unfavorable to the Qing dynasty. The ones who resisted the Qing Empire were Prince Gan, (Note: Referring to Hong Rengang, whose title was Prince/King Gan (忠王)) Prince Zhong (Note: Referring to Li Xiucheng, whose title was Prince/King Zhong (忠王)) and the other [princes]." (Chinese: 太平天國的那些舊事全是我父親和洪仁軒干的， 坐江山的也是他，跟我有什麼關係，即使我在登基之后，也没有做出任何對清朝不利的事情，那些反抗清朝的事都是干王、忠王等人做的。) After the second day of writing a poem praising the Qing dynasty, he was executed by slow slicing on 18 November 1864 at the age of 14.

Despite his short reign as king, he was still issued an official seal made of jade (玉璽; yù xǐ), which is exhibited in the Hong Kong Museum of History.

== Bibliography ==
- Mark Juergensmeyer & Wade Clark Roof, Taiping Rebellion, in Encyclopedia of Global Religion, Volume 1, SAGE, 2012, pp. 1257.
- Nick Shepley, Sun Yat Sen and the birth of modern China: 20th Century China: Volume One, AUK Academic, 2013.
- James Z. Gao, Taiping Rebellion, in Historical Dictionary of Modern China (1800–1949), Scarecrow Press, 209, pp. 350–352.

== Notes ==
Regnal titles
Preceded by Hong Xiuquan	Heavenly King of Taiping; 1864	Succeeded by Position abolished
