= Thistle Mountains =

Mountain range in Guangxi, China

The Thistle Mountains (Chinese: 紫荆山; pinyin: Zǐjīng shān; lit. ' Chinese redbud Mountains') are a mountain range in Guangxi, China that is part of the Dayao Mountains (zh:大瑤山). They are mostly concentrated in Guiping County. In the 1840s the area was the primary base of the God Worshipping Society, which eventually launched the Taiping Rebellion against the Qing dynasty.
