= Guiping =

Guiping 桂平市 · Gveibingz Si Kweiping; Sunchow; Sünchow
- County-level city
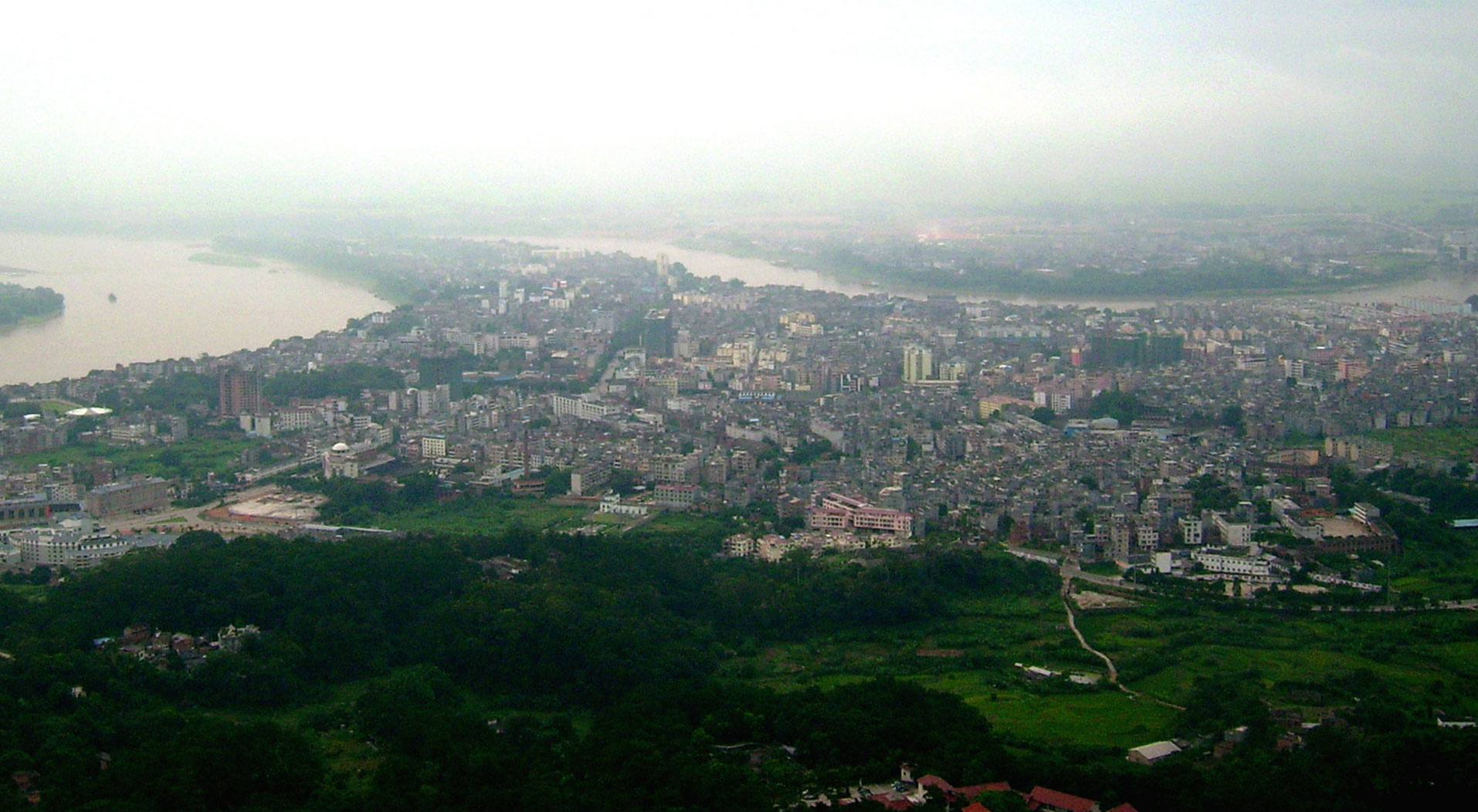
- Guiping, seen from Mt. Xi
- Interactive map of Guiping
- Coordinates: 23°24′N 110°05′E
- Country: China
- Region: Guangxi
- Prefecture-level city: Guigang
- Township-level divisions: 21 towns 5 townships
- Municipal seat: Xishan (西山镇)

Area
  - Total: 4,074 km^{2} (1,573 sq mi)
- Elevation: 50 m (160 ft)

Population (2005)
  - Total: 1,700,000
  - Density: 420/km^{2} (1,100/sq mi)
- Time zone: UTC+8 (China Standard)
- Postal code: 537200
- Area code: 0775

Guiping

Chinese name
- Chinese: 桂平
Transcriptions
Standard Mandarin
- Hanyu Pinyin: Guìpíng
- Wade–Giles: Kui-p'ing
Yue: Cantonese
- Yale Romanization: Gwaipìhng
- Jyutping: Gwai3ping4

Xunzhou
- Traditional Chinese: 潯州
- Simplified Chinese: 浔州
Transcriptions
Standard Mandarin
- Hanyu Pinyin: Xúnzhōu
- Wade–Giles: Hsün-chou
Yue: Cantonese
- Yale Romanization: Chàhmjāu
- Jyutping: Cam4zau1

Zhuang name
- Zhuang: Gveibingz

Guiping (Chinese: 桂平; pinyin: Guìpíng; Jyutping: Gwai3ping4) is a county-level city in eastern Guangxi, China. It is under the administration of Guigang City, located at the confluence of the Qian and Yu rivers, which are the Xi River's primary north and south tributaries, respectively.

== Names ==
Guiping was formerly known as Xunzhou (浔州). From 1855 to 1861 it was the capital of the rebel state of Da Cheng and was called Xiujing.

== Geography and climate ==
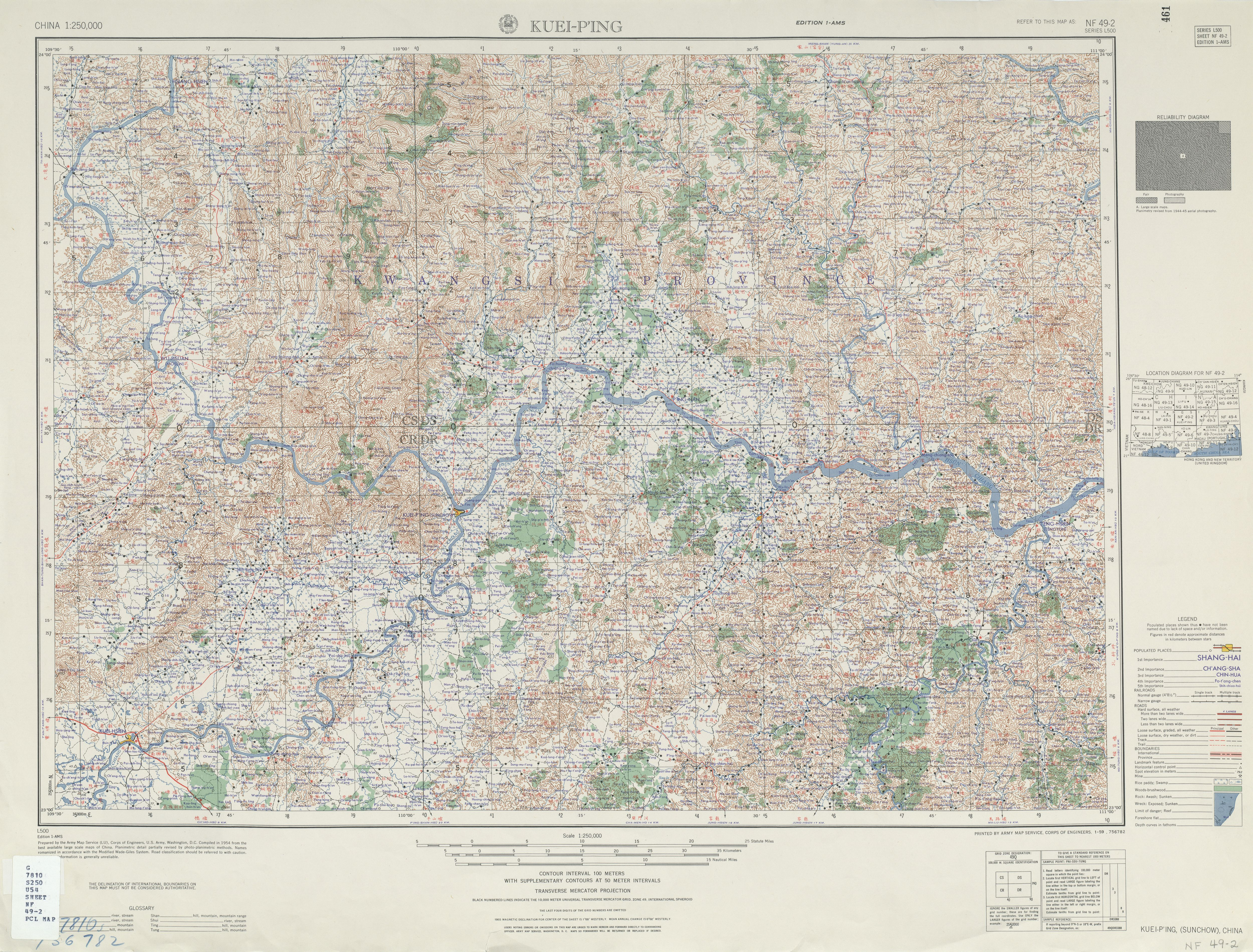
Map including Guiping (labeled as KUEI-P'ING (SUNCHOW) 桂平) (AMS, 1954)

Guiping has a monsoon-influenced humid subtropical climate (Köppen Cfa), with short, mild winters, and long, hot, humid summers. Winter begins dry but becomes progressively wetter and cloudier. Spring is generally overcast and often rainy, while summer continues to be rainy though it is the sunniest time of year. Autumn is sunny and dry. The monthly 24-hour average temperature ranges from 12.5 °C (54.5 °F) in January to 28.6 °C (83.5 °F) in July, and the annual mean is 21.58 °C (70.8 °F). The annual rainfall is around 1,735 mm (68 in), and is delivered in bulk (~46%) from May to July, when the plum rains occur and often create the risk of flooding. With monthly percent possible sunshine ranging from 13% in March to 53% in September, the city receives 1,596 hours of bright sunshine annually.

Climate data for Guiping, elevation 130 m (430 ft), (1991–2020 normals, extremes 1953–present)
Month	Jan	Feb	Mar	Apr	May	Jun	Jul	Aug	Sep	Oct	Nov	Dec	Year
Record high °C (°F)	28.9 (84.0)	33.9 (93.0)	35.0 (95.0)	35.9 (96.6)	36.9 (98.4)	37.3 (99.1)	39.4 (102.9)	39.2 (102.6)	38.4 (101.1)	36.4 (97.5)	33.2 (91.8)	29.9 (85.8)	39.4 (102.9)
Mean daily maximum °C (°F)	16.6 (61.9)	18.4 (65.1)	20.7 (69.3)	26.1 (79.0)	30.1 (86.2)	32.0 (89.6)	33.3 (91.9)	33.4 (92.1)	32.0 (89.6)	29.0 (84.2)	24.5 (76.1)	19.3 (66.7)	26.3 (79.3)
Daily mean °C (°F)	13.0 (55.4)	14.8 (58.6)	17.4 (63.3)	22.3 (72.1)	25.9 (78.6)	27.7 (81.9)	28.7 (83.7)	28.7 (83.7)	27.4 (81.3)	24.2 (75.6)	19.7 (67.5)	14.8 (58.6)	22.0 (71.7)
Mean daily minimum °C (°F)	10.6 (51.1)	12.3 (54.1)	15.1 (59.2)	19.7 (67.5)	23.1 (73.6)	25.0 (77.0)	25.8 (78.4)	25.7 (78.3)	24.3 (75.7)	20.9 (69.6)	16.5 (61.7)	11.9 (53.4)	19.2 (66.6)
Record low °C (°F)	−3.3 (26.1)	0.1 (32.2)	3.3 (37.9)	8.3 (46.9)	14.4 (57.9)	18.6 (65.5)	21.4 (70.5)	19.4 (66.9)	15.5 (59.9)	9.8 (49.6)	4.6 (40.3)	0.6 (33.1)	−3.3 (26.1)
Average precipitation mm (inches)	72.6 (2.86)	64.3 (2.53)	118.8 (4.68)	150.4 (5.92)	275.3 (10.84)	316.1 (12.44)	264.1 (10.40)	188.8 (7.43)	117.6 (4.63)	69.2 (2.72)	66.8 (2.63)	55.2 (2.17)	1,759.2 (69.25)
Average precipitation days (≥ 0.1 mm)	12.5	12.9	19.3	17.5	18.6	20.2	17.5	15.4	10.9	6.3	7.4	8.8	167.3
Average snowy days	0.1	0	0	0	0	0	0	0	0	0	0	0	0.1
Average relative humidity (%)	78	80	85	83	82	83	80	79	77	73	73	73	79
Mean monthly sunshine hours	68.6	55.9	45.2	75.6	123.1	136.6	184.2	196.3	184.7	180.2	140.0	118.3	1,508.7
Percentage possible sunshine	20	17	12	20	30	34	45	49	51	51	43	36	34
Source: China Meteorological Administration extremes

== Administrative divisions ==
Guiping administers 21 towns and 5 townships:

Towns:

- Mule (木乐镇)
- Mugui (木圭镇)
- Shizui (石嘴镇)
- Youma (油麻镇)
- Shepo (社坡镇)
- Luoxiu (罗秀镇)
- Madong (麻垌镇)
- Shebu (社步镇)
- Xiawan (下湾镇)
- Mugen (木根镇)
- Zhongsha (中沙镇)
- Dayang (大洋镇)
- Dawan (大湾镇)
- Baisha (白沙镇)
- Shilong (石龙镇)
- Mengxu (蒙圩镇)
- Nanmu (南木镇)
- Jiangkou (江口镇)
- Jintian (金田镇)
- Zijing (紫荆镇)
- Xishan (西山镇)

Townships:

- Mapi Township (马皮乡)
- Xunwang Township (寻旺乡)
- Luobo Township (罗播乡)
- Houlu Township (厚禄乡)
- Dongxin Township (垌心乡)

== Demographics ==
According to the Seventh National Census in 2020, the city's Permanent Population (hukou) was 1,511,011. Compared with 1,496,904 people in the Sixth National Census in 2010, a total of 14,107 people increased over the past ten years, representing a growth of 0.94%, with an average annual growth rate of 0.09%.

Among the permanent residents of the city, the male population is 794,095, accounting for 52.55%. The female population was 716,916, accounting for 47.45%. The sex ratio of the total population (with females as 100, the ratio of males to females) was 110.77, an increase of 2.93 compared with 107.84 in the Sixth National Census in 2010.

== See also ==
- Jintian Uprising
