= Siege of Suzhou =

Siege and Massacre during Taiping Rebellion

- Part of Taiping Rebellion
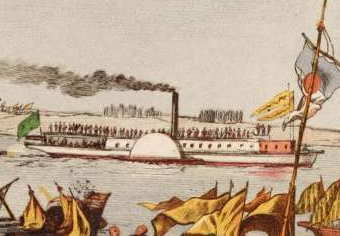
- Firefly, a steamer present during the siege of the Royal Navy
Date	September - 5 December 1863
Location	Suzhou, China
Result	Anglo-Qing Victory; Taiping garrison surrendered

Belligerents
Qing Dynasty; United Kingdom	Taiping Heavenly Kingdom

Commanders and leaders
(Qing dynasty) Li Hongzhang (United Kingdom) Charles George Gordon (Qing dynasty) Cheng Xuechi	(Taiping Heavenly Kingdom) Tan SauGuan (Taiping Heavenly Kingdom) Li Xiucheng (Taiping Heavenly Kingdom) Shi Dakai (Taiping Heavenly Kingdom) Hong Tianguifu (Taiping Heavenly Kingdom) Hong Xiuquan

Units involved
(Qing dynasty) Huai Army (United Kingdom) (Qing dynasty) Ever Victorious Army (Royal Navy) Gunboat Detachments	(Taiping Heavenly Kingdom) 14-18 Wans

Strength
Total Army:28,000-30,0000; Infantry:20,000-25,000; Cavalry:4,000; Artillery:180 pieces Huai Army:20,000-25,000; Infantry:20,000; Cavalry:2,000-3,000; Artillery:150 pieces EVA :5,000; Infantry:3,000-4,000; Cavalry:400-800; Artillery:20-30 Pieces	Total Army:200,000; Infantry:180,000-190,000; Cavalry:5,000-8,000; Artillery:60-80 pieces

Casualties and losses
100-150 killed and wounded during the siege	300-400 died during the siege 10,000 executed 170,000+ captured

The Battle of Suzhou was fought on 6 December 1863 between the Anglo-Qing army and the Taiping army. This battle was also for known the Suzhou Massacre, in which by the command of Li Hongzhang, 10,000 rebels were executed.

== Background ==
By the early 1860s, the Taiping Heavenly Kingdom was declining after years of bitter fighting against the Qing Dynasty. Once the revolutionary force which had captured major territories across the Sourthen China, the rebellion was being pressed back towards the core strongholds in Jiangsu and Zheijiang. The city of Suzhou was the wealthiest and one of the most strategically vital centre in the Yangtze delta. Its fall would open the route towards Nanjing, the capital of the rebellion.

The Qing sent the Huai Army under the command of Li Hongzhang, which was a provincial force consisting of 25,000 men of which 3,000 was cavalry and nearly 150 artillery pieces (included western modernized cannons). Li's force wassupported by the Charles Gordon's Ever Victorious Army (EVA), with 5,000 Chinese men under the command of European officers and 6 steam powered gunboats of the Royal Navy.

Inside the city, the Taiping garrison numbered nearly 200,000 men, organized in Wan divisions. There were 14-18 wans each consisting of 12,500 men, and each having 5 banners in them. Despite their large numbers, the defenders faced shortages of food, ammunition, and modern artillery. Their morale was weakened by the steady advance of the Qing and effectiveness of Gordon's gunboats along the canals.

== The Siege ==
In the autumn of 1863, the Haui army and the EVA under advanced steadily through Jiangsu, encircling the Taiping positions. After successful victories at Changzhou and Wujiang, Li and Gordon had reached the outskirts of Suzhou by September.

=== October ===
The Huai army and EVA started blockading the city, they besieged the city. Skirmishing and raiding started happening. The EVA fleet consisting of 30-50 junked boats(having 12-pounder guns) and 6 steamers with up to 32-pounder guns and 12-pounder howitzers, had started bombarding river outposts and took control of the canals. Li and Gordon's men also captured the Pan Gate and the Mudu blockhouse fort. This disrupted the supply lines and forced the defenders inside the second layer of walls in the city.

=== November ===
By November, the siege had entered a decisive phase. The Qing forces tightened the encirclement by storming smaller canal forts and villages, while gunboats also cut off supply lines along the waterways. With outer defense collapsing, the Taiping garrison was forced to clear the walls of Suzhou and get to the citadel. At the same time, Li Hongzhang started negotiating with Tan SauGuan, offering leniency to encourage surrender. Shortages of food and ammunition, coupled with declining morale, made the resistance untenable.

=== December ===
By early December, the siege had reached its breaking point. The Taiping garrison inside Suzhou was exhausted, short on food and ammunition, and morale had collapsed after weeks of encirclement and loss of outer defenses. On 6 December 1863, under negotiated terms, the city gates were opened to Hongzhang's army. Gordon assured the Taiping commanders that their lives will be spared if surrendered.

== Surrender ==
=== Terms of surrender ===
After Gordon's guarantee and terms of surrender, Tan Sauguan surrenders. The terms were-

i) The Taiping commanders and rebels will be granted a general pardon and will be spared from execution.

ii) The Taiping will be permitted to retire with their property and spared from execution.

iii) The Taiping will be given a safe passage while leaving the city.

These terms were personally discussed by Gordon with the Taiping commanders, trusting these terms, the Taiping surrender the city without resistance.

=== The opening of gates ===
After the negotiations were mediated by Gordon, which concluded with promises of general pardon and safe retirement. On 5 December, the city gates were opened in accordance with these terms. Once the gates were opened, the Anglo-Qing army entered without resistance. The Taiping commanders and princes formally presented themselves to Hongzhang and Gordon. The garrison was expected to leave the city gradually over the following days, taking their families and belongings together.

=== Capturing the Taiping ===
Instead of being released, the Taiping leaders were escorted under Qing guard to Li's headquarters. This was presented as a surrender ceremony, but in practice was a detention. At the banquet, the princes were seized, and Hongzhang order their execution soon after, they were beheaded despite Gordon's guarantee of safety.

== Aftermath ==
On 9 December, when the surrendered garrison was corralled into the designated areas outside the city walls, awaiting dispersal. This containment made them vulnerable, once the leaders were arrested, by the command of Li, the soldiers were also rounded up and killed in large numbers over the following days. Estimates suggest nearly 10,000 were killed, but some contemporary records suggest the number hiked till 30,000. Due to this betrayal, Gordon's reputation fell, and this also made controversy between the British Parliament and Qing Dynasty. The fall of Suzhou opened the route for Ningpo.
