= Li Shixian =

Chinese military leader (1834–1865)

Shi King Li Shixian
- Born: 1834; Tengxian, Guangxi, Qing Empire
- Died: 23 August 1865 (aged 30–31); Guangdong, Nanjing, Qing Empire
- Military career
- Allegiance: (Qing dynasty) Qing Empire (1848–1849); Taiping Heavenly Kingdom (1849–1864)
- Service years: 1852–1865
- Rank: Field Marshal
- Nickname: Giant
- Conflicts: Eastern Front: First rout the Army Group Jiangnan (1856); Second rout the Army Group Jiangnan (1860); Battle of Shanghai (1861–1863); Battle of Cixi (1862); Determined battle of Northern Jiangsu (1863); Battle of Suzhou (1863); Third Battle of Nanking (1864); Western Front: Second Battle of Wuhan (1854); Battle of Sanhe (1858); Battle of Fujian (1864)
- Awards: Shi Tian Fu (侍天福); King of Shi (侍王)

Li Shixian (simplified Chinese: 李世贤; traditional Chinese: 李世賢; pinyin: Lǐ Shìxián; 1834 – 23 August 1865) was a pre-eminent military leader of the late Taiping Rebellion. He was the cousin of military leader Li Xiucheng and was known for being very tall for a native of Guangxi province, standing at 2 metres (6.6 ft) tall. During his military tenure, he was given the title of King of Shi (侍王) (meaning "Servant Prince"). In the latter part of the Taiping rebellion, he led Taiping forces to many military victories. Later in his life, he invited an aging Wei Yuan to live in his home and was known to hold counsel with the famous scholar. He was eventually assassinated by a traitor in Guangdong.

== Victories ==
=== Army Group Jiangnan ===
Army Group Jiangnan (江南大營) of the Qing empire had encircled the Taiping capital of Nanjing twice, laying siege in an attempt to end the war. The second siege consisted of nearly 200,000 Qing soldiers by March 1858, but they were routed when Li Shixian's Taiping force broke out of the capital in May 1860. With the Qing routed, Li Shixian was able to occupy all of the rich Zhejiang Province.

== Defeats ==
=== Versus Zuo Zongtang ===
In 1862, the Qing ordered Zuo Zongtang to attack Li Shixian in Zhejiang province. The Qing were successful, and after a number of hard-fought battles they recaptured all of Zhejiang. Li Shixian's rebel forces were reduced from about 350,000 at the outset of the campaign to around 200,000 in 1864, when the Taiping capital of Nanjing fell. After the capital fell, Li Shixian again successfully broke out with his remaining army and escaped along the coast to Fujian Province (Battle of Fujian).

=== The last Taiping forces ===
October 1864 around 12,000 pro-Taiping forces commanded by the Shi King Li Shixian captured Zhangzhou. They held the city for several months until surrendering in the next summer.

Li, and his remaining force of 40,000, came back to eastern Guangdong province, the Guangdong had been home to many Taiping forces of the first generation before they were driven out of their homeland during the first Battle of Nanking. Zuo Zongtang ordered six major generals to lead 70,000 soldiers of the Qing army, staging them for an invasion in Jiaoling County. On May 1, 1865, 20,000 Taiping forces surrendered to this army. Li disguised himself as a monk and escaped. On May 23 he came back to Taiping, however the army he had led no longer trusted him. He was betrayed, and assassinated on August 25, 1865.

== See also ==
- Battle of Changzhou
- Fujian Pocket
- Black Flag Army
