= Tan Shaoguang =

- Born: 1 December 1835; Guigang, Guangxi, Qing Empire
- Died: 7 December 1863 (aged 28); Suzhou, Qing Empire
- Military career
- Allegiance: Qing Empire (to 1849); Taiping (to 1863)
- Service years: 1852–1863
- Rank: Captain general
- Conflicts: Taiping Rebellion: Jintian uprising Eastern Front: Second rout the Army Group Jiangnan(1860); Battle of Shanghai (1861); Battle of Suzhou (1863); Western Front: Battle of Sanhe(1858)
- Awards: King of Mu; E An

Tan Shaoguang (simplified Chinese: 谭绍光; traditional Chinese: 譚紹光; pinyin: Tán Shàoguāng) (1835 – December 1, 1863) was a military leader of the Taiping Rebellion. During his military tenure he was known as the King of Mu (慕王) ("Seeker Prince"). As a young soldier he joined the Jintian Uprising. After several years he was promoted to general, and led the Taiping forces to many military victories. He was awarded the E An in 1861. He was murdered by traitors after an interrogation in 1863.

== Notable victories ==
The Army Group Jiangnan (江南大營) were Qing soldiers who encircled Nanjing twice, in March 1858 and May 1860. The first siege used 200,000 soldiers, and was led by Li Xiucheng. It was routed in 1860, after occupying Jiangsu Province (except for Shanghai). Tan also fought in the Battle of Shanghai (1861).

== Death ==
Li Xiucheng's mansion was built in Suzhou, where it is the only one from the Taiping Rebellion still existing today. In July 1863 Li ordered his son-in-law, Tan Shaoguang, to assume control of Suzhou. Li Hongzhang led the Huai Army; the "Ever Victorious Army", which had been raised by an American, Frederick Townsend Ward, was placed under the command of Charles George Gordon. With its support Li Hongzhang won several battles, leading to the surrender of Suzhou.

Six days before Tan was killed, Li Hongzhang conducted a secret negotiation with eight generals on a boat on Yangcheng Lake. He asked them to kill Tan, promising their safety. To seal their agreement, Li prepared a dinner of rich, sweet Taiping crabs.

Before recapturing Suzhou from the Taiping forces, the eight generals met with Tan in the inner city. Tan accused his generals of cowardice; his guards killed over 1,000 soldiers, but his traitorous generals killed him after Li Xiucheng's escape. Two days before this meeting, Li Xiucheng had warned Tan Shaoguang of the treachery; Tan did not believe him, refusing to escape and follow him. Following Tan's death, the traitorous generals opened the city door; over 200,000 Taiping forces surrendered, and welcomed Li Hongzhang as he recaptured Suzhou. However 10,000 of them were killed on orders of Li.

Tan Shaoguang was also the husband of one of Liu Xiucheng's three daughters; one of which was married to Chen Binwen, another Taiping general.

== See also ==
- The Warlords

== Sources ==
- Tiān Guó Zwi(天國志)
