= Suzhou massacre =

The Suzhou massacre was an incident involving the Huai Army (淮軍) led by Li Hongzhang in Suzhou following the Siege of Suzhou. The Taiping Army 200,000 surrendered to Li Hongzhang in December 1863, but Li ordered the deaths of 10,000 POWs on the Twin Pagodas in Suzhou.

== See also ==
- Charles George Gordon
- Cheng Xuechi
- The Warlords
- Tan SauGuan
