= Li Rongfa =

- Born: 9 January 1845; Tengxian, Guangxi, Qing Empire
- Died: 1 January 1891 (aged 45); Jiangning District, Nanjing, Qing Empire
- Military career
- Allegiance: Qing Empire (to 1849); Taiping Heavenly Kingdom (to 1864)
- Service years: 1859–1864
- Rank: Lieutenant General
- Conflicts: Eastern Front: Second rout the Army Group Jiangnan (1860); Battle of Shanghai (1861–1863); Battle of Cixi (1862); Determined battle of Northern Jiangsu (1863); Third Battle of Nanking (1864)
- Awards: King of Zhong second(忠二王)

Li Rongfa (simplified Chinese: 李容发; traditional Chinese: 李容發; pinyin: Lǐ Róngfā) (1845–1891) was a military rebel leader of the Taiping Rebellion. He was the second son of Li Xiucheng.

== Name ==
He was also known during his military tenure as Zhong Erwang or King Zhong II (忠二王).

== History ==
The Qing dynasty dispatched the Jiangnan Daying to quell the Taiping Rebellion in Nanjing. In March 1858, they deployed 200,000 soldiers, and by May 1860 had occupied all of Jiangsu province except for Shanghai. This would eventually lead to the Battle of Shanghai.

Li Rongfa was just 14 years old at the time, and followed orders from his father, Li Xiucheng who was also involved in this battle.

== See also ==
- Boxer Rebellion
- List of revolutions and rebellions
- Miao Rebellion (1854–1873)
- Nian Rebellion

== Sources ==
- Tiān Guó Zwi (天國志)
