= Battle of Shanghai (disambiguation) =

The Battle of Shanghai (1937) was the first of the twenty-two major engagements fought during the Second Sino-Japanese War.

Battle of Shanghai may also refer to:

- Battle of Shanghai (1861), a major engagement of the Taiping Rebellion
- January 28 incident, a short conflict between the armies of the Republic of China and the Empire of Japan in 1932 Shanghai
- Battle of Shanghai (1937)
- Shanghai Campaign, a major engagement in the Chinese Civil War

== See also ==
- Battle of Woosung (1842), a battle which allowed Britain to capture Shanghai in the First Opium War
