= Chen Kunshu =

- Born: 1 January 1820; Guigang, Guangxi, Qing Empire
- Died: 7 May 1864 (aged 44); Changzhou, Jiangsu, Qing Empire
- Military career
- Allegiance: Qing Empire (to 1849); Taiping (to 1864)
- Service years: 1850–1864
- Rank: Taiping‘s Colonel General
- Conflicts: Eastern campaign: Second rout the Army Group Jiangnan (1860); Battle of Shanghai (1861--1863); Battle of Cixi (1862); Battle of Changzhou (1864); Western Expedition: Battle of Sanhe (1858)

Chen Kunshu (Chinese: 陳坤書; died May 1864) was a prominent military leader of the Taiping Rebellion, and known during his military and political career as the King of Hu (護王; Hu Wang). He led Taiping forces to many military victories especially the Second rout the Army Group Jiangnan. He was executed by Li Hongzhang after interrogation in 1864. Chen was an important General and was the sole person responsible for the late Taiping Rebellion.

Li Hongzhang used Chen to balance Li Xiucheng's power, which was originally justified, but grew too large.

== Wins ==
Eastern campaign

- Second rout the Army Group Jiangnan (1860):
- 26 May:occupied Changzhou
- 30 May:occupied Wuxi
- 2 June:occupied Suzhou
- 13 June:occupied Wujiang, Jiangsu
- 15 June:occupied Jiaxing

It made Zeng Guofan offer a reward of 50,000 silver tael to arrest alive Chen and death 25,000 tael (a soldier's monthly salary at the time was 2 silver tael).

- Battle of Shanghai (1861—1863)
- Battle of Cixi (1862)

Western campaign

- Battle of Sanhe(1858)
