= Battle of Shanghai (1861–1862) =

1861–1862 battle in the Taiping Rebellion

- Part of Taiping Rebellion (Eastern Expedition)
Date	July 1861 – November 1862
Location	Shanghai western, southern and Pudong
Result	Qing dynasty victory
Territorial changes	Southeast China

Belligerents
Qing dynasty (France) French Empire; United Kingdom	Taiping Heavenly Kingdom

Commanders and leaders
(Qing dynasty) Li Hongzhang (Qing dynasty) Cheng Xueqi (Qing dynasty) Huang Yisheng (黃翼昇) (Qing dynasty) Pan Dingxin (潘鼎新) (Qing dynasty) Guo Songlin (郭松林) (Qing dynasty) Liu Mingchuan (France) Auguste Léopold Protet † (United Kingdom of Great Britain and Ireland) James Hope (Qing dynasty) Frederick Townsend Ward (Qing dynasty) Edward Forrester	Li Xiucheng; Tan Shaoguang; Li Rongfa; Ji Qingyuan (吉慶元); Chen Kunshu; Chen Bingwen (陳炳文); Gao Yongkuan (郜永寬)

Strength
40,000 Green Standard Army; 20,000 Huai Army; 3,000 Ever Victorious Army (France) 4,000 (United Kingdom) 3,000	120,000

Casualties and losses
? deaths	? deaths

The Battle of Shanghai (太平軍二攻上海) was a major engagement of the Taiping Rebellion that occurred from June 1861 to July 1862. British and French troops used modern artillery on a large scale for the first time in China. Cannon fire inflicted heavy casualties on the Taiping forces, whose commander Li Xiucheng was wounded in the left leg by a shot fired from a cannon.

== Prelude ==
From 1851 to 1853, the Chinese City of Shanghai had been occupied by the Small Swords Society, who were nominally allied with the Taiping Rebellion. The Qing fully recaptured the area in February 1853.

In June 1860 a Taiping army of 20,000 led by Lai Wenguang had attacked Shanghai and reoccupied it for five months before withdrawing. In early 1861 Li Xiucheng was in control of Zhejiang and Jiangsu provinces, commanding over 600,000 Taiping troops. He aimed to capture the large but isolated city, one of the most important cities under the Qing government and home to an international port. At Li Xiucheng's request the UK and France had promised to maintain neutrality.

By 11 June 1861 the Taiping Army was able to muster five armies, commanded by Tan Shaoguang, Li Rongfa, Ji Qingyuan, Chen Kunshu, and Chen Bingwen, organized under two fronts, and other units.

The commander of the Imperial Green Standard Army was Huang Yisheng, under the direction of Shanghai's taotai Wu Xu (吳煦). The Huai Army militia were led by Li Hongzhang. Hong Rengan was very opposed to this battle because he thought Shanghai was not a military problem.

== First stage ==
On 1 March 1862 the combined troops of Hope and Ward's units routed the Taiping forces near Xiaotang village, just outside of the city. (now a part of Shanghai's Fengxian District). This victory gains Ward the promotion to brigadier general and his army gains the moniker "Ever Victorious Army".

Taiping's Lieutenant General Li Rongfa began the battle with an invasion of Pudong by 20,000 men, transported in thousands of boats. Upon his occupation of the whole district the city requested help from the British and French. In October (according to the Chinese calendar), the American Frederick Townsend Ward brought 2,000 Filipino and Chinese soldiers, whom he had trained, against the Taiping forces.

Following a 15-day Christmas ceasefire called by Li Rongfa, the government of Shanghai asked Beijing for assistance in December. In response the Huai Army with its 20,000 soldiers was sent to reinforce Shanghai immediately.

== Middle stage ==
On the 10th day of the 4th month of the Chinese calendar in 1862, Li Hongzhang was promoted to governor of Jiangsu province, of which Shanghai was a part. Five days later the Huai Army began its counterattack on Shanghai.

At the same time the mayor of Jinshan commanded 5,000 men of the Green Standard Army to surround and attack the city of Taicang, which was then occupied by Taiping forces. Li Xiucheng sent 100,000 men to relieve Taicang on 19 April. Despite orders from Li Hongzhang to withdraw, the mayor refused to do so, resulting in the loss of his entire force.

On the 29th of the month, Major General Chen Bingwen occupied Jiading, whose Qing garrison withdrew to Shanghai proper. The Taiping Army then prepared to attack Songjiang and northwestern Shanghai from Jiading. Li Hongzhang ordered Maj. Gen. Cheng Xueqi, vice-commander of the Huai Army, to counterattack against Chen Bingwen.

On the 1st day of the 5th month, Li Rongfa's force surrendered to the Huai Army in Nanhui. Li Hongzhang delegated Brig. Gen. Liu Mingchuan to accept their surrender, provoking Li Rongfa to order Lt. Gen. Ji Qingyuan to make a series of attacks against Liu Mingchuan in the district. The failure of these attacks forced Li Rongfa to withdraw from Pudong on the 10th day, ending nine months of occupation. The Qing government thus regained control of eastern and southern Shanghai.

On the 8th day, Cheng Xueqi launched an assault on the Taiping forces occupying Songjiang and expelled them after 13 days of combat.

By the end of the month, Taiping forces have been expelled from a thirty-mile radius of Shanghai.

Li Hongzhang's Huai Army arrived in the area in mid-May but were defeated at Jiajing by the Taiping.

== Last stage ==
In September 1862 a Taiping army of 80,000 under the command of Tan Shaoguang mounted a second attack on Shanghai, which was defended by Maj. Gen. Guo Songlin (郭松林) of the Huai Army. The initial assault, led by Chen Bingwen (陳炳文), faltered when Cheng Xueqi destroyed all 20 Taiping camps (one of which accommodated 500 soldiers); Chen Binwen retreated to Sijiangkou (四江口), where he joined Tan Shaoguang.

On 12 September the consolidated Taiping forces, numbering 70,000, struck the Qing again from Taicang and Kunshan. Moving very rapidly, they reached Qingpu, only 5 km from the city, and surrounded 20,000 Imperial troops. Qing fleet commander Huang Esen counterattacked from the river, gaining some ground, but even after reinforcement by the Ever Victorious Army he was unable to make much progress. The Taiping forces used this time to build many floating bridges.

Li Hongzhang arrived to oversee the combat in person, ordering his generals (Cheng, Guo and Liu) to defeat Tan at Jiading and relieve the Imperial units surrounded by the Taiping on the northern coast before it was too late. On 21 September Cheng Xueqi, commanding only 6,000 combined Huai Army and Qing naval forces, in eight successive attacks made between 0800 and 1400 was finally able to cut off the Taiping Army's retreat. The Huai Army broke out of the enclave on the northern coast, killing over 30,000 Taiping troops. Cheng himself received a serious gunshot wound to the chest, but was rewarded with a promotion to Lieutenant General.

Gen. Tan, accompanied by Brigadier Gau Yongkuan (郜永寬), retreated to Suzhou to prepare its defenses. The Taiping forces launched four more unsuccessful attacks against the defenders, after which Hong Xiuquan ordered the offensive to be halted and the forces to withdraw, ending the battle. The combined forces of the Qing government, the British and the French were victorious, and Taiping permanently abandoned its designs on Shanghai.

== Sources ==
- Teng Yuan-chung. Americans and the Taiping Rebellion. 1982. OCLC 10559213
- Tiān Guó Zhi(天國志)
- Franz H. Michael, ed.The Taiping Rebellion: History and Documents (Seattle,: University of Washington Press, 1966). 3 vols. Volumes two and three select and translate basic documents.
- Jian, Youwen (1973). The Taiping Revolutionary Movement. New Haven: Yale University Press. ISBN 0300015429. Translated and condensed from the author's publications in Chinese; especially strong on the military campaigns, based on the author's wide travels in China in the 1920s and 1930s.
- Elleman, Bruce A. (2001). Modern Chinese Warfare, 1795–1989 (illustrated ed.). Psychology Press. p. 64. ISBN 0415214734.
