= Battle of Changzhou =

1863-1864 battle during the Taiping Rebellion

Date	25 December 1863 – 11 May 1864 (decisive phase between 25 April and 11 May )
Location	Changzhou and towns outside Jintan
Result	Qing victory
Territorial changes	Qing recover all of Jiangsu

Belligerents
Qing dynasty	Taiping Heavenly Kingdom

Commanders and leaders
(Qing dynasty) Governor of Jiangsu Li Hongzhang (then 40 years) (Qing dynasty) Bao Chao (United Kingdom) Charles George Gordon (Qing dynasty) Major General Zhou Shengbo (Qing dynasty) Zhang Shusheng (Qing dynasty) Liu Mingchuan	Chen Kunshu (executed); Li Shixian (defended Jintan early) Chen Jueshu; Fei Tianjan

Strength
110,000 Huai Army 4,000 Ever Victorious Army	80,000 Taipings

Casualties and losses
15,000 Huai Army killed	Unknown

Battle of Changzhou occurred during the Taiping Rebellion. It was won by the Qing dynasty, who regained control over all of Jiangsu.
