= Battle of Fujian =

Coordinates: 25.94°N 118.30°E

Date	August 1864 – June 1865
Location	Fujian, China
Result	Qing Dynasty victory
Territorial changes	Qing recover previously lost territories in Fujian

Belligerents
(Qing dynasty) Qing Dynasty	Taiping Heavenly Kingdom

Commanders and leaders
Zuo Zongtang	Li Shixian

Strength
130,000 Xiang Army	280,000 Taipings

Casualties and losses
Unknown	Unknown

The Battle of Fujian (August 1864 – June 1865) was fought between forces of the Qing Dynasty and rebels from the Taiping Heavenly Kingdom. By October 1864 around 12,000 pro-Taiping forces commanded by the Shi King Li Shixian had captured Jianning, Shaowu, Tingzhou and Zhangzhou. They held the city for several months until surrendering in the next summer. The Qing recovered territories in Fujian previously lost to the rebels.
