= Opening up the Mountains and Pacifying the Aborigines =

Qing dynasty policy in Taiwan (1874–1895)

Date	1874–1895 (intermittent)
Location	Taiwan
Result	Qing Empire forces entered the eastern hinterland; numerous tribes displaced from their original territories

Belligerents
Taiwanese indigenous peoples	Qing Empire

Opening up the Mountains and Pacifying the Aborigines (Chinese: 開山撫番) refers to the policy carried out by the Qing court beginning after the Mudan incident of 1874 in the peripheral regions of Qing-ruled Taiwan.

The terms "Opening the Mountains" and "Pacifying the Aborigines" reflect the Qing administration's own framing of the policy; scholars have variously characterized the actual operations as military campaigns of subjugation, forced displacement, and coercive cultural assimilation of indigenous communities. The policy involved actively entering Taiwan's eastern hinterland (encompassing today's central mountain areas, the eastern counties of Hualien and Taitung County, and the region south of Fangliao in Pingtung County) and subjugating highland indigenous polities (referred to by the Qing as "mountain tribes" and by the plains indigenous peoples as "plain aborigines"). It was initiated by Taiwan maritime defense imperial commissioner Shen Baozhen and subsequently continued by Taiwan Governor Liu Mingchuan.

== Policy content ==
=== Opening the Mountains ===
During Shen Baozhen's tenure as imperial commissioner, in addition to memorializing the throne to establish Taipeh Prefecture in order to redress the imbalance between the north and south, he also urgently sought to address the problem of geographic barriers and transportation difficulties between Taiwan's western and eastern regions. He believed that opening mountain routes and pacifying indigenous peoples had to be carried out simultaneously, and that the eastern hinterland had to be actively developed to prevent it from being seized by foreign powers. He therefore pressed to open communication routes between the western and eastern regions, proceeding simultaneously along three routes: the Northern Route from Suao in Kavalan Prefecture to Sakiraya in Hualien County, totaling 205 li; the Central Route from Linpilu in Changhua County to Posko in Hualien County, totaling 265 li; and the Southern Route from Sheliao in Pingtung County to Beinan in Taitung County, totaling 214 li. The Central Route is the only one of the three that survives to the present day, now designated a National Historic Site as the Baxiangguan Ancient Trail.

=== Pacifying the Aborigines ===
During Shen Baozhen's tenure, he expanded administrative divisions to encroach upon the territories of Taiwan's indigenous peoples (the "raw aborigines"). He separately established Puli as Puli Sub-Prefecture, changed the "Northern Route Commissioner for Civil Affairs and Aboriginal Affairs" to the "Central Route Commissioner for Civil Affairs and Aboriginal Affairs," and relocated its seat to Puli. In addition, he established Beinan Sub-Prefecture in the eastern hinterland and stationed the "Southern Route Commissioner for Civil Affairs and Aboriginal Affairs" there. Scholars have described the "pacification of aborigines" measures as involving both administrative and coercive elements. The plans drawn up included selecting indigenous leaders, registering indigenous households, demarcating indigenous landholdings, learning indigenous languages, prohibiting feuding and killing, establishing indigenous schools, building roads, and changing dress and appearance. As mountain roads were opened deeper into the highlands, indigenous communities along the routes were approached for pacification, with those who resisted facing military force. Communities that refused to comply were subjected to military campaigns that destroyed settlements, provoking armed indigenous resistance.

=== Massacres and armed conflict ===
he military operations during this period resulted in several incidents in which indigenous communities suffered severe casualties or near-annihilation. The Dagangkou incident involved the killing of Amis leaders who had been lured under false pretenses to the Qing camp.

The Jialiwan massacre of 1878 was among the most devastating events of the period. Qing forces attacked the allied Sakizaya and Kavalan settlements in the Hualien plain, resulting in a massacre that left both peoples on the verge of extinction. The tribal chief Kumud Pazik (古穆·巴力克), who had gone to the Qing camp to surrender, was executed by lingchi, and his wife Icep Kanasaw (伊婕·卡娜蕭) was publicly killed. The surviving Sakizaya, fearing further reprisals, concealed their identity within the Amis people for generations; they were not officially recognized as a distinct indigenous group in Taiwan until 2007.

=== Abolition of the ban on crossing to Taiwan ===
Shen Baozhen concluded that, in order to fully implement the policy and to cultivate the plains and exploit various resources, it was necessary to lift the longstanding restrictions on Han Chinese bringing their families to the island, the prohibition on Han Chinese illegal crossings, and the bans on Han Chinese entering mountain areas and on Han Chinese marrying indigenous women. By lifting these restrictions, large numbers of Han Chinese could be brought in to accelerate and consolidate the policy's objectives. Accordingly, in February 1875, Shen Baozhen memorialized the throne and received approval to rescind all such prohibitions on Taiwan.

== Expansion of pacification ==
During the Chinese-French War of 1884–1885, when French forces invaded Taiwan, the Qing court became acutely aware of Taiwan's strategic importance for coastal defense. In 1885 Taiwan was established as a province, and Liu Mingchuan became Taiwan Governor, making defense, military administration, tax reform, and aboriginal pacification the four pillars of his new policies. Due to financial constraints, the new policies prioritized an expanded "pacification of aborigines" aimed at plundering forest resources and monopolizing the camphor trade. Han settlers were recruited to open up and develop forest resources in a process built upon the seizure and subjugation of Taiwan's indigenous territories. Efforts to sinicize the indigenous peoples were undertaken, including the establishment of an Indigenous School (Taiwan) (番學堂) in Taipei that provided food and clothing and taught arithmetic, Chinese classical writing, Mandarin, Taiwanese, and Han Chinese ways of life.

Liu Mingchuan and local wealthy merchants entered into arrangements described by scholars as mutually reinforcing: local merchants purchased official posts by contributing funds to the government and providing militia recruits; officials launched military campaigns to seize indigenous lands deeper in the mountains; the lands were then leased to local merchants who recruited Han laborers and camphor workers to open up the forests; the revenues were then used to fund further military operations through rents and taxes. Beginning in 1886, this cycle sustained a continuous series of Dakekan campaigns over seven years, using the military superiority of Qing forces to subjugate the Atayal communities in the areas of present-day Daxi, Sanxia, Fuxing, and Wulai. Many Taiwan indigenous communities either had their villages destroyed and their populations killed or scattered, or were forced to flee their original territories and retreat deeper into the mountains; Han Chinese settlers were then relocated into the vacated areas. Owing to indigenous resistance, most communities were never easily occupied by Qing forces, and the traditional polities of Taiwan's highland indigenous peoples were not fully dislodged during the Qing period.

== Contemporary assessment ==
Hu Chuan (胡傳), father of Hu Shih and the last Zhili Sub-prefect of Taitung Directly Administered Sub-prefecture, recorded a critical assessment of Liu Mingchuan's policy in his private writings:

It has been eighteen years since Taiwan first discussed opening the mountains. Military campaigns have achieved nothing; pacification has produced no results; land reclamation has not yielded a single plot of land reported for tax assessment; defense has done nothing but protect the tea sheds, farm huts, and camphor sheds of wealthy gentry and local strongmen, without being able to stop fierce aborigines from headhunting. Each year enormous sums are squandered on defense stipends and pacification and reclamation expenses. The benefits are plainly nonexistent, yet the same failed path is trodden again and again—twice, three times, four times—with no awakening and no remorse. Is this not a most extraordinary and baffling affair?

== Bibliography ==
- David Pong, translated by Chen Ju: 《沈葆楨評傳——中國近代化的嘗試》(Shen Baozhen: A Critical Biography—An Attempt at Modernization in China), in Chinese. Shanghai: Shanghai Ancient Books Publishing House, 2000.
- Wen Zhenhua (溫振華): 《臺灣原住民史．政策篇（清治時期）》 (History of Taiwan's Indigenous Peoples: Policy Section (Qing Dynasty Period)), in Chinese. Nantou: National Taiwan History Museum, 2007).
