= Li Chendian =

Chinese politician, general (1823–1901)

Viscount of the First Rank Li Chendian
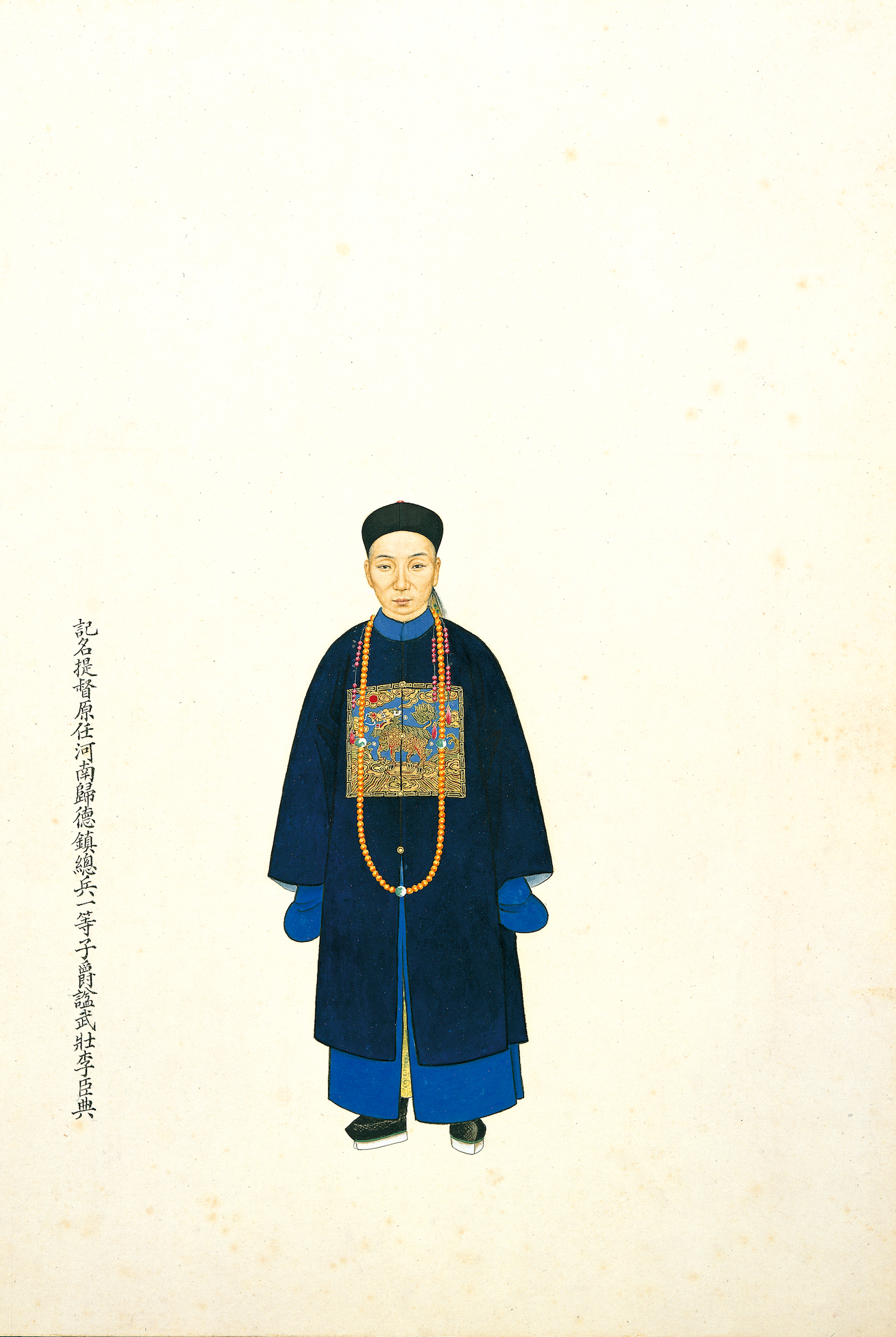

Commander of Gui-De Garrison, Heinan Province with the rank of full general(提督銜河南歸德鎮總兵)

Personal details
- Born: 1838
- Died: 2 July 1864 (aged 25–26) Jiangsu, Qing Empire
- Occupation: general

Military service
- Allegiance: Qing Dynasty
- Branch/service: Qing Army
- Rank: General
- Commands: Xiang Army
- Battles/wars: Taiping Rebellion

Li Chenden (Chinese: 李臣典; pinyin: Lǐ Chéndiǎn; 1838 - 2 July 1864) was a military general during the late Qing Dynasty in China. He joined the Xiang Army and fought effectively against the Taiping Rebellion, which restored stability of the Qing.

- Hummel, Arthur W. Sr., ed. (1943). "Index" . Eminent Chinese of the Ch'ing Period. United States Government Printing Office.
- Porter, Jonathan. Tseng Kuo-Fan's Private Bureaucracy. Berkeley: University of California, 1972.
- Wright, Mary Clabaugh. The Last Stand of Chinese Conservatism: The T'ung-Chih Restoration, 1862 -1874. Stanford, CA: Stanford University Press, 1957.
- Third Battle of Nanking
