= Hobe Fort =

Historical fort in New Taipei, Taiwan

- 滬尾礮臺
- Tamsui, New Taipei, Taiwan
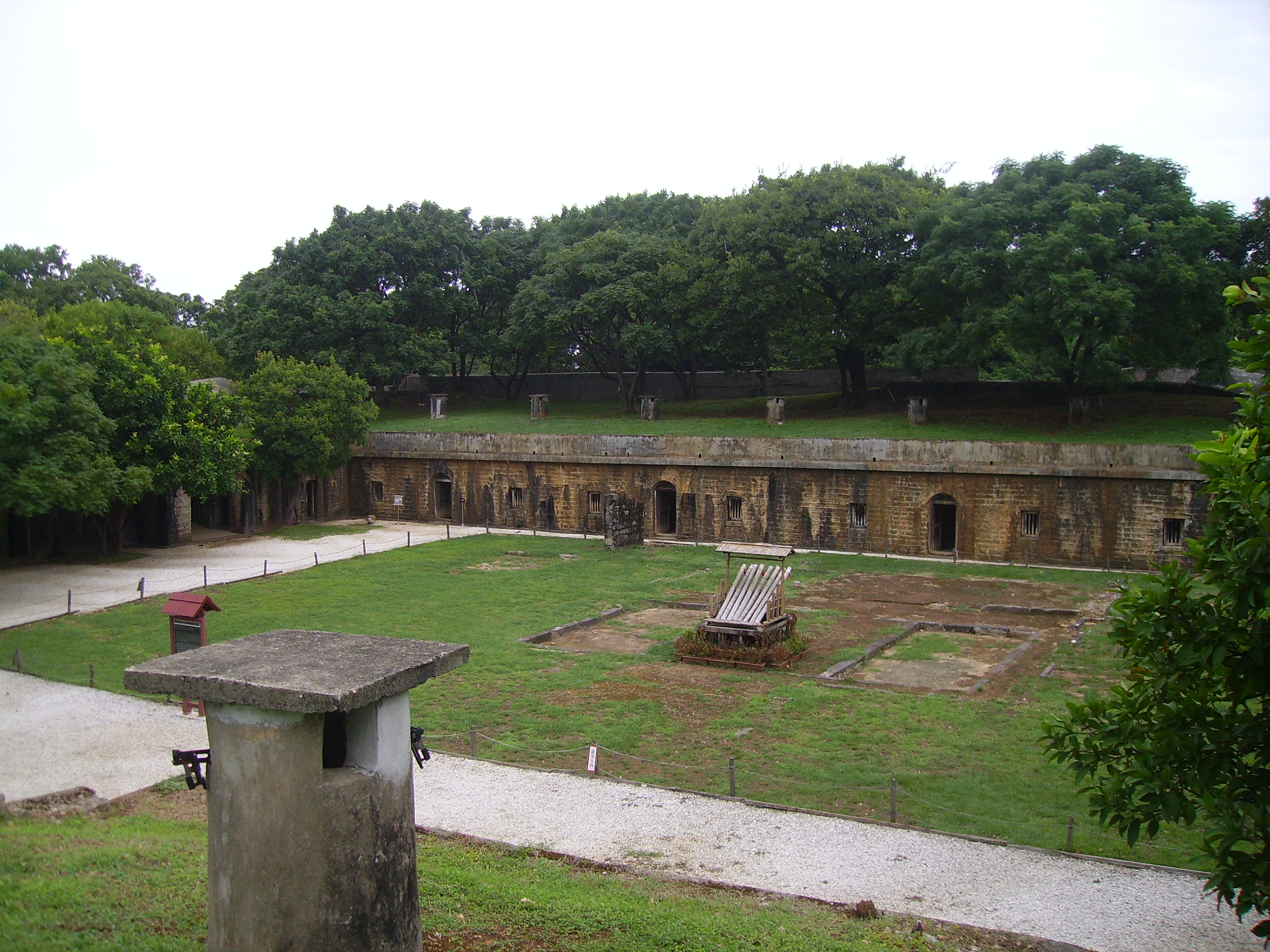

Site information
- Type: Fort

Location
- Taiwan
- Coordinates: 25.179306°N 121.429343°E
- Height: 7 meters

Site history
- Built: 1888

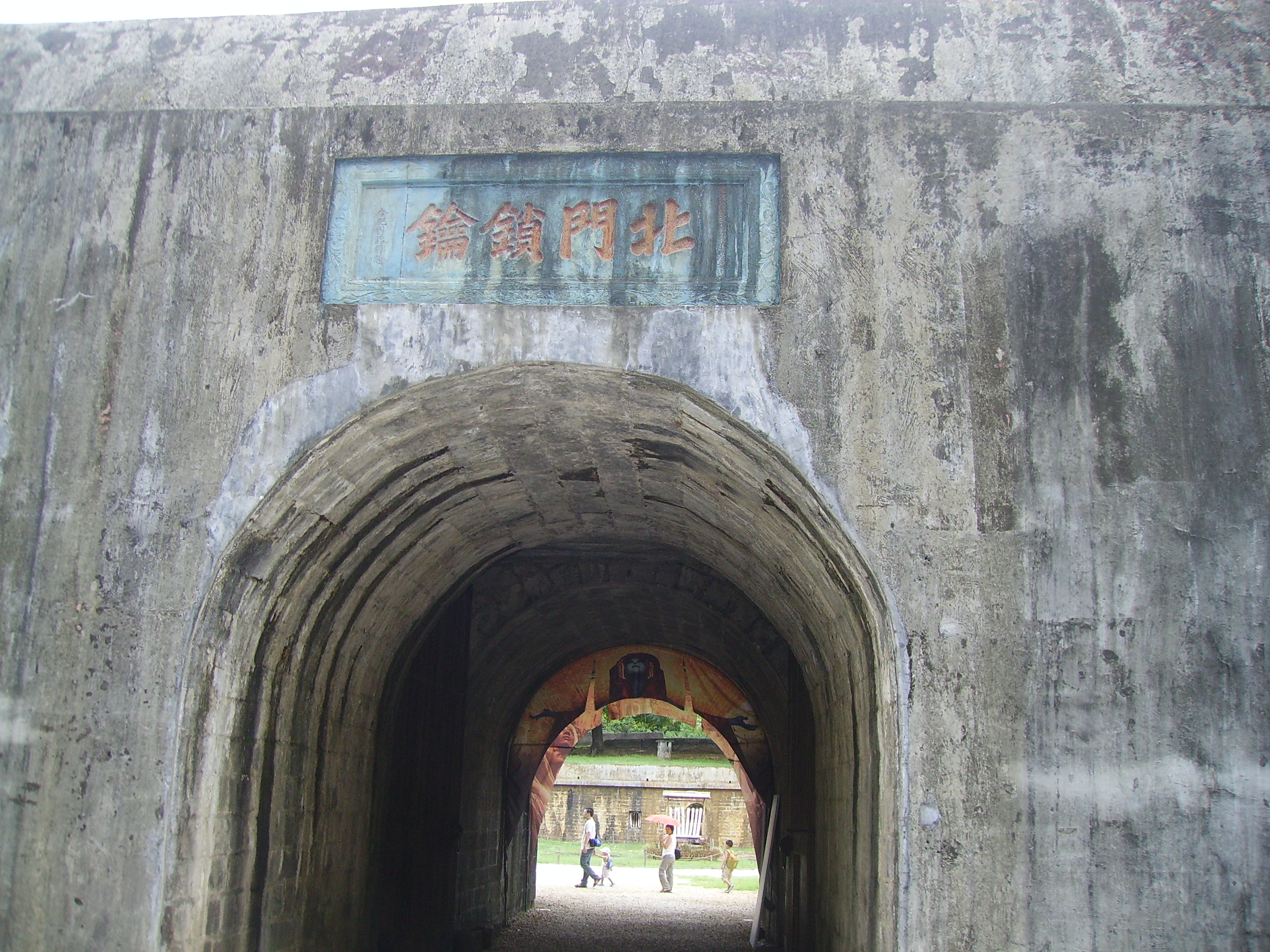
The Key to the North Gate

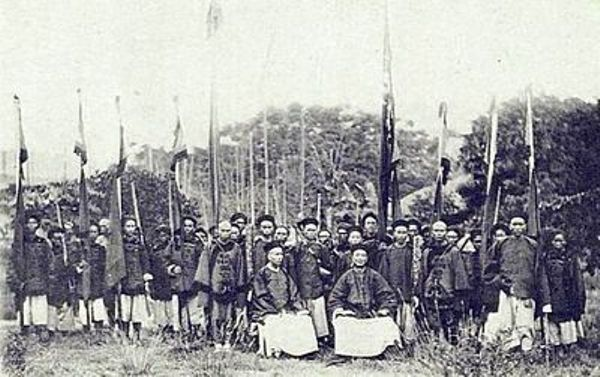
A group of Qing soldiers during the Sino-French War

Hobe Fort
- Traditional Chinese: 滬尾礮臺
Transcriptions
Standard Mandarin
- Hanyu Pinyin: Hùwěi Pàotái
Southern Min
- Hokkien POJ: Hō͘-bé Phàu-tâi or Hō͘-bóe Phàu-tâi
- Tâi-lô: Hōo-bé Phàu-tâi or Hōo-bué Phàu-tâi

Hobe Fort is a historical fort located near Fort Santo Domingo, in Tamsui District, New Taipei, Taiwan, Republic of China.

== History ==
In the 1880s Imperial China (Qing dynasty) and France fought a war over an area that is today Vietnam. In October 1884 as part of the Keelung Campaign, the French fleet sailed to northern Taiwan where it blockaded the ports of Keelung and Tamsui, and then landed troops at both places. The Chinese managed to turn back the assault at Tamsui, though Keelung fell to the French.

The Sino-French War (1884–1885) at Tamsui proved to the Qing government that their coastline defense wasn't as secure as it needed to be. Following the war, the Chinese government decided to strengthen Taiwan's coastal defenses with forts at Keelung, Tainan – Fort Zeelandia – and Tamsui. Governor of Taiwan Liu Mingchuan was ordered to strengthen the defenses on the Taiwan Strait. Governor Liu planned to build forts at every major estuary in order to facilitate defense. He adopted the military strategy of "Learn from foreigners to defeat foreigners". In particular, he employed a German expert Lieut Max E. Hecht to help set up ten new forts at the estuaries of Penghu, Keelung, Hobe (Tamsui), Anping and Cihou (Cijin). There were two forts in Hobe, the "Key to the North Gate" which was Hobe Fort and the "Defense of the East". However, the latter no longer exists.

Hobe Fort was finished in 1888 (the Guang-Xu 12th year of the Qing dynasty), taking western forts as a reference to design blueprint. So far it is the best preserved fort built by Liu Mingchuan in Taiwan.

At that time Governor Liu purchased 31 "Armstrong" cannons and German "Krupp" cannons from the British through the Jardine Matheson Holdings Limited and set up these cannons at ten new forts in Taiwan. The installation of these cannons was completed in 1889 (the Guang-Xu 15th year of the Qing dynasty). However Hobe Fort never saw action during wartime, hence its fairly good shape.

During the Japanese colonial period, the Imperial Japanese Army (IJA) withdrew four cannons from Hobe Fort and turned the place into an exercise field for artillery practice. After Taiwan came under Chinese Nationalist (KMT) administration, Nationalist troops were stationed in Hobe Fort. It was not until 1985 that Hobe Fort was designated by the Ministry of the Interior, Executive Yuan, as a National Level 2 Ancient Monument. After downsizing of Taiwan's Provincial Government, Hobe Fort came to be managed by the Taipei County Government and reopened to the public after restoration. Currently it is classified as a National Monument.

== Architecture ==
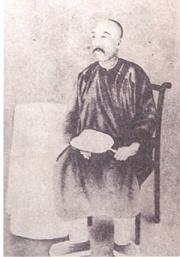
Liu Mingchuan

Because the fort never saw combat it remains almost entirely intact. The barracks that once stood in the Central Square during the Qing dynasty are gone, as are the guns, but the outer walls, vaults and gate are close to their original conditions. The vaults inside the fort now contain a museum about the French landing in Tamsui.

The outmost periphery of the Fort is piled up with soil. The earthen wall is 6.5 meters in height, about the same height as the Fort, with shelter and defense capabilities. The trench surrounding the Fort separates the sub-wall from the earthen wall, similar to the role of the moat. The only exit and entrance is the barrack gate in the southeastern side of the Fort. The gate still bears the four original Chinese words 北門鎖鑰 (Běimén Suǒyuè), meaning "The Key to the North Gate", in regular script on the lintel over the door inscribed by Liu Mingchuan, who was governor at the time of the fort's construction. The main wall of the Fort was built using iron cement materials. The maximum thickness of the sub-wall is 4.2 meters and the maximum height is up to 7 meters. The sub-wall has several holes which were used for shell stockpiles during the war.

The barbettes are gathered up on both sides facing the sea. The biggest cannon is installed in the north-west. The barbette has a circular cannon shot rack with full 360-degree rotation. The firing angle covers the entire Tamsui River estuary. The sub-wall near the muzzle is in concave arc shape in response to trajectory clearance. There are four modern breechloaders mounted on the barbette. The main barbette is set up with one 12-inch Armstrong breechloader and one 8-inch Krupp breechloader. The secondary barbette is set up with one 10-inch Armstrong breechloader and one 8-inch Krupp breechloader. The sub-wall next to the barbette has a row of shell-shaped fillisters used for shell stockpiles.

The top of the barracks is covered with a layer of soil. The soil coating is soft in texture with the effects of attracting shells (containing the impact of shells). There are also ventilation holes in the soil coating.

The sub-wall has a corridor used as space for ammunition depot and barracks. The corridors are connected with each other, providing soldiers with mobility of combat dispatch.

The Central Square once had barracks in the Qing dynasty, and is speculated to have been used as a commanding office by high-level officers. After it collapsed during the Japanese colonial period, this open space was converted to a field of military training.

== See also ==
- List of tourist attractions in Taiwan
