= Hefei No. 8 High School =

Coordinates: 31.8082°N 117.2068°E

- 合肥市第八中学

Location
- 1688 Xiyou Road, Shushan District; Hefei, Anhui; China

Information
- Other name: Hefei No. 8 Senior High School
- Type: Public
- Motto: 我畅想，我追问，我行动
- Established: 1956
- Principal: Wang Jianming (王建明)
- Enrollment: about 5300
- Campus: Urban, 24.71 acres
- Color: Various shades of green
- Website: 合肥八中

Hefei No. 8 High School (Chinese: 合肥市第八中学; pinyin: Héféishì Dìbā Zhōngxué), commonly referred to as Hefei Bazhong (Chinese: 合肥八中; pinyin: Héféi Bāzhōng), is a public high school in Hefei, Anhui, China.

== Notable alumni ==
- Li Keqiang, the Premier of the State Council of the People's Republic of China
- Miao Wei, the Minister of the Ministry of Industry and Information Technology
- Yang Zhi, fantasy writer and novelist
- Xie Nan, TV presenter and singer
- Li Yapeng, actor
