= Third Battle of Nanjing =

Part of the Taiping Rebellion (1864)

- Part of the Taiping Rebellion
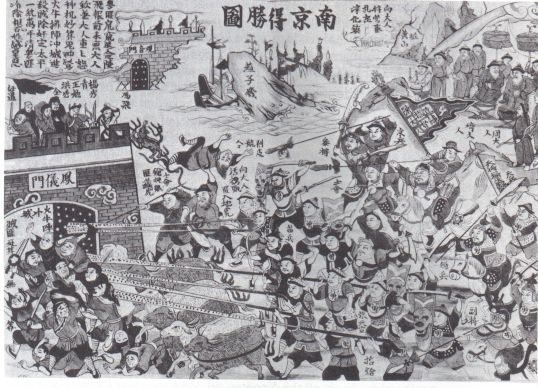
Date	14 March – 19 July 1864
Location	Nanjing, Qing China
Result	Qing victory: Mass scale summary execution, wartime rape, looting, and arson; End of the Taiping Rebellion

Belligerents
Qing dynasty	Taiping Heavenly Kingdom

Commanders and leaders
(Qing dynasty) Zeng Guofan (Qing dynasty) Zeng Guoquan (Qing dynasty) Zhu Hongzhang	Hong Xiuquan # Li Xiucheng (executed)

Strength
500,000+ Xiang Army	370,000 defenders

Casualties and losses
10,000+ died of illness 9,000+ killed	Zeng Guofan allege 100,000 Taiping soldier casualties 200,000+ surrendered
- 200,000–300,000 civilians massacred

The Third Battle of Nanjing in 1864 was the last major engagement of the Taiping Rebellion in the Qing Empire. With the fall of Nanjing, the capital of the Taiping Heavenly Kingdom, the rebellion came to an end. The Hunan Army, an unpaid and barely fed militia commissioned by the Qing Empire, lost all their discipline and committed mass-scale random murder, wartime rape, looting, and arson against the civilians of Nanjing, seen as "rebels". 200,000–300,000 "rebels" were reported dead by Zeng Guofan, the commander-in-chief of the Hunan Army.

== Prelude ==
In June 1863, Qing Gen. Bao Chao took Jiufu Island (九洑洲) and the Taiping Army lost control of the entire northern shore of the Yangtze. Imperial Gen. Bao Chao subsequently led his force across the river and camped on the southern bank outside the Shence (神策) Gate of Nanjing. In September, Zeng Guofan's younger brother, Gen. Zeng Guoquan, attacked and took the Shangfang Bridge (上方桥) region southeast of the city and the Jiangdong Bridge (江东桥) region to the southwest. Zeng Guoquan continued his quest in the suburbs of Nanjing, and by early November had succeeded in taking regions including Shangfang Gate (上方门), Gaoqiao Gate (高桥门), Shuangqiao Gate (双桥门), Qiqiaoweng (七桥瓮), Muling (秣陵) Pass and Zhonghe Bridge (中和桥). The Taiping army had therefore lost all of its positions in the southwestern part of the Purple Mountain. By mid-November, regions including Chunhua (淳化), Jiexi (解溪), Longdu (龙都), Hushu, Sancha Town (三岔镇) had fallen under the Qing army's control. At the same time the Imperial navy commanded by Imperial Adm. Peng Yulin (彭玉麟) and his deputy, Yang Yuebin (杨岳斌, also known as Yang Zaifu 杨载福), took important regions including Gaochun and Eastern Dam (Dong Ba 东坝) with the help of Bao Chao's forces. By late November, the Taiping garrison at Lishui had surrendered to the Qing army. As a result, the Taiping army was evicted from the region within 50 miles of Nanjing. On 25 November, Zeng Guoquan and his subordinate, Gen. Xiao Qingyan (萧庆衍), deployed troops at the Ming Xiaoling. The only links to the outside left were the Shence and Taiping Gates.

On 20 December, Li Xiucheng returned to Nanjing from Danyang and urged Hong Xiuquan to abandon the Taiping capital the next day. However, this suggestion was not accepted by Hong, who took overall command of the operation. He declared that anyone who disobeyed him and God would be immediately executed. This doomed the Taiping army and Nanjing by creating widespread discontent and, coupled with other factors, eventually over 200,000 Taiping troops went out of Nanjing and surrendered to the Imperial Chinese army during the course of the battle. Those who refused to surrender but were also upset by Hong's decisions chose to break out while they still could, when the siege was still incomplete. Hong, Li, and others were unable to stop such acts. On 28 February 1864, Tianbao (天保) Castle at the highest peak of the Purple Mountain fell under the Qing army's control. On 2 March, Zeng Guoquan deployed his troops to the Shence and Taiping Gates. The investment of Nanjing was completed.

== The battle ==
On 14 March, Zeng Guoquan attempted his first attack on Nanjing using ladders, but this was beaten back by the defenders. The imperial army then changed tactics, digging a total of ten tunnels at the Chaoyang (朝阳), Shence, and Jinchuan (金川) Gates, and the defenders in turn countered by digging tunnels of their own and building a secondary wall behind the first. Five days after the death of Hong Xiuquan on 1 June 1864, Li Xiucheng was finally put in charge of all military and political affairs, but it was already too late—the fate of the city and its defenders was sealed.

On 3 July, Dibao Castle (地保城, nicknamed Dragon's Neck 龙脖子) on the Purple Mountain fell into the Qing army's hands. This strategic location enabled the Qing to build several dozen artillery positions to bombard the entire city, thus suppressing the defenders' firepower and providing cover for other preparations to take the city. One tactic of the attackers was to fill the space between the city wall and the mountain ridge at the Dragon's Neck with earth, sand, logs, rocks, and grass, so the land surface was raised to the height of the city wall, thus paving the way to attack the city. Another was to dig tunnels just 200 feet away from the city wall so that they could be filled with explosives to blow up the wall. Operations within such close proximity of enemy fire were possible due to sufficient covering fire, thanks to the taking of Dibao Castle. The defenders' attempts to disrupt the preparations were continuously beaten back with heavy losses due to withering fire from the attackers. Two weeks later the preparation was complete.

Realizing the final attack was coming, on the night of 18 July, Li Xiucheng ordered more than 1,000 defenders to disguise themselves as attackers to sneak out of the city to destroy the tunnel, but the attackers were not fooled and beat back the thousand-man formation. The following afternoon at 1:00, the attackers detonated the explosives in the tunnel under the Taiping Gate, the wall breaking and flying 2–10 km far down, killing several hundred people and collapsing a large section of the city wall. The defenders put up a fierce fight, but were unable to drive back the attacking force of 60,000. The attackers divided into four fronts after entering Nanjing as previously planned:

- The central front led by imperial Gen. Li Chendian attacked toward Hong Xiuquan's palace
- The right front led by imperial Gen. 刘连捷 (Liu Lianjie) pushed toward the Shence Gate to link up with imperial Gen. Zhu Nangui (朱南桂)'s force, which entered the gate via ladders; after the two teams had joined forces, they would attack westward toward Lion Mountain (Shizishan 狮子山) to take the Yifeng (仪凤) Gate.
- The central-left front led by imperial Gen. Peng Yuju (彭毓橘) attacked toward the Tongji (通济) Gate.
- The left front led by imperial Gen. Xiao Fusi (萧孚泗) attacked toward the Chaoyang and Hongwu Gates.

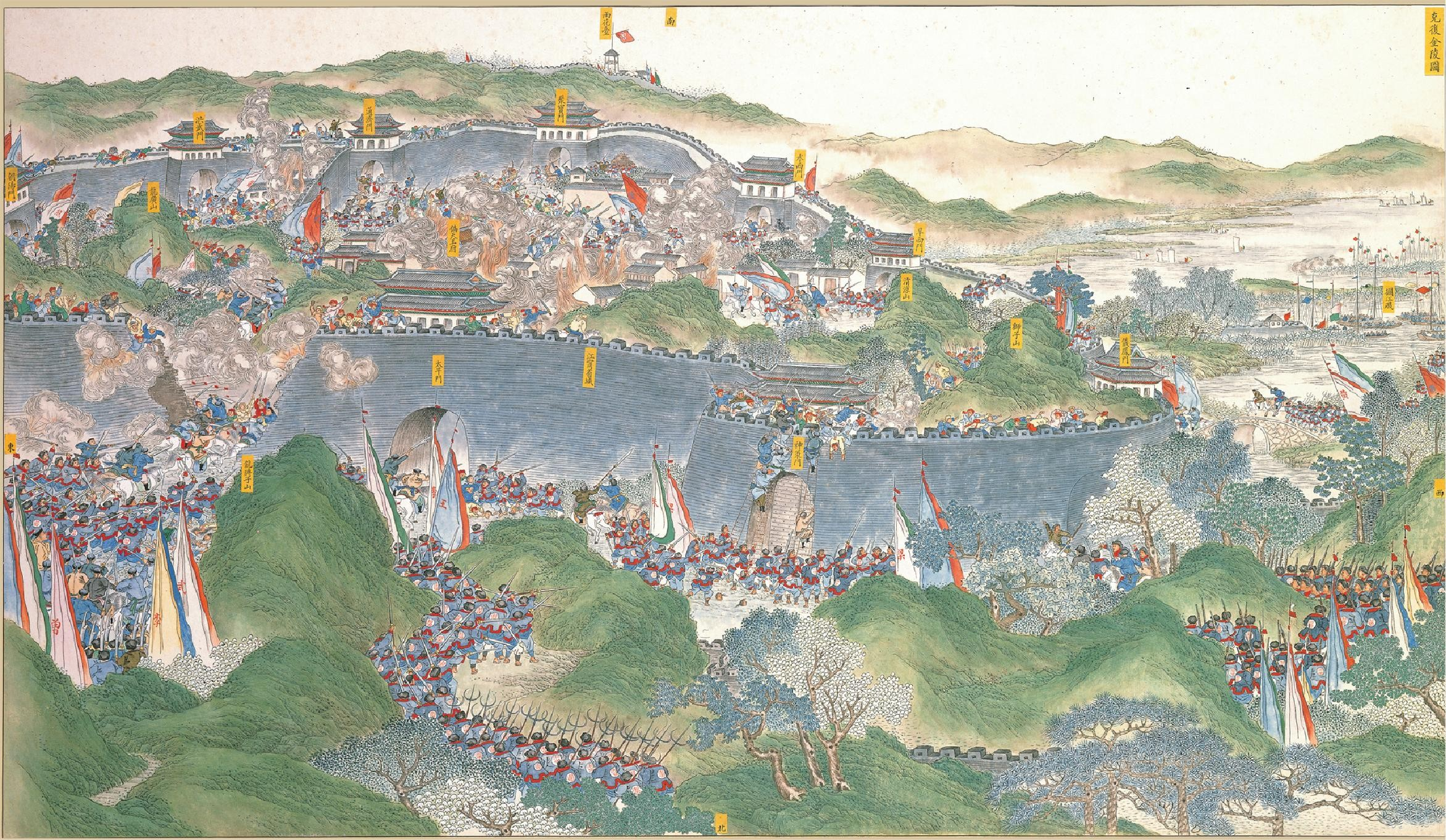
A painting depicting Qing forces recapturing Nanjing.

The street fights were fierce and bloody and the resistance was much tougher than expected. The attackers' artillery cover had to stop for fear of injuring their own. The defenders were very stubborn and expected to inflict heavy casualties on the attackers and hoped to drive them back outside the city.

After the fall of the Chaoyang Gate, the defenders' morale collapsed and imperial Gen. Luo Fengyuan (罗逢源) was able to break his force into the city from the Jubao (聚宝) Gate, while imperial Gen. Li Jinzhou (李金洲) was able to break into the city from Tongji (通济) Gate, linking up with forces led by imperial Gen. Peng Yuju (彭毓橘). At the same time, imperial Adm. Huang Yisheng (黄翼升) led the imperial navy in taking Zhongguan (中关) and then took the remaining fortresses still in the defenders' hands at the river banks, and helped imperial Gen. Chen Ti (陈湜) take two, the Shuixi (水西) and Hanxi (旱西) Gates. By the evening, every gate of the city was firmly in the hands of Qing forces.

Li Xiucheng immediately returned to Hong Xiuquan's palace after the defeat at the Taiping Gate in the morning, and took Hong's son with him to escape via the Hanxi Gate. However, Li's force of several thousand were beaten back with heavy losses by imperial Gen. Chen Ti's troops and was forced to go to Qingliang Mountain (清凉山). At night Li Xiucheng's remaining force of 1,000 went to the Taiping Gate, disguised themselves as Qing soldiers and successfully escaped toward the Ming Xiaoling Mausoleum via the section of collapsed city wall because the Qing troops were busy looting and did not bother to stop them. After massive looting, the city was set on fire, which lasted until 26 July 1864.

== Massacre ==
"The vaunted discipline of the Hunan Army broke down completely when Nanjing fell. The militia soldiers were unpaid and barely fed, and with this total victory in their final objective—after years of bitter campaign away from their families and their homes, [...] younger women were dragged off and the remaining able-bodied men were forced into service as porters to carry away huge loads of loot from the city—gold, silver, silks, furs, jade. Even some of Zeng Guoquan's own aides who entered the city to investigate the looting were robbed and beaten by roving gangs of Hunan soldiers. First the soldiers set fire to the palaces; then they burned the homes."

== Aftermath ==
Li Xiucheng did not get far after his initial breakout. Zeng Guoquan sent out a cavalry force of 700 after him and Li lost contact with Hong Xiuquan's son. Most of the Taiping army's commanders failed to escape: Lie (列) King Li Wancai (李万材) was captured on 21 July, at Chunhua (淳化) Town, while Zhang (章) Lin Shaozhang (林绍璋) and Junior Western King (幼西王) Xiao Youhe (萧友和) was killed at Hushu Town on the same day. On 22 July, Li Xiucheng himself was captured alive near Square Mountain (Fangshan 方山). On 28 July, the overall commander of the battle, Zeng Guofan, reached Nanjing from Anqing and ordered Li to write his confession; he was executed after its completion on 7 August. Only Zun (遵) King Lai Wenguang succeeded in breaking out with his 3,000 cavalry to eventually join and lead the Nien Rebellion, during which he continued to fight for another four years.

The success of the Qing army was partially due to the advanced weaponry adopted, namely firearms. The first Chinese indigenously built bolt-action single-shot rifle appeared in 1864, and although they were few in number, proved themselves over other firearms and certainly over ancient weapons such as swords, sabres, spears, and lances. The Third Battle of Nanjing was a testing ground for the first modern Chinese firearms used in battle.
