= Li Xiucheng =

Head of military affairs in the Taiping Heavenly Dynasty (1850–1864)

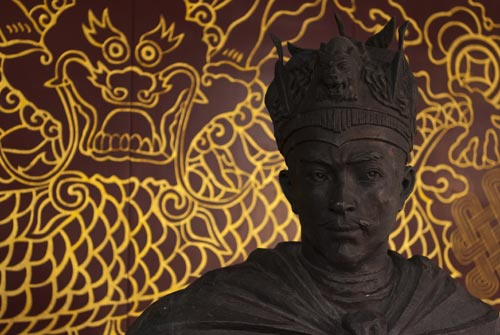
- Bust of Li Xiucheng in Suzhou
- Born: 1823; Teng County, Guangxi, Qing Empire
- Died: 7 August 1864 (aged 40–41); Jiangning, Nanjing, Qing Empire
- Military career
- Allegiance: Qing Empire (to 1849); Taiping Heavenly Kingdom (to 1864)
- Service years: 1852–1864
- Rank: Field Marshal
- Nickname: The Loyal King
- Conflicts: Eastern campaign: First rout the Army Group Jiangnan (1856); Second rout the Army Group Jiangnan (1860); Battle of Shanghai (1861–1863); Battle of Cixi (1862); Final Battle of North Jiangsu (1863); Battle of Suzhou (1863); Third Battle of Nanking (1864); Western Expedition: Second Battle of Wuhan (1854); Battle of Sanhe (1858)

Chinese name
- Chinese: 李秀成
Transcriptions
Standard Mandarin
- Hanyu Pinyin: Lǐ Xiùchéng
- Wade–Giles: Li^{3} Hsiu^{4}-ch'eng^{2}
Wu
- Wugniu: Li^{6} Shieu^{5}-zen^{6}
Hakka
- Pha̍k-fa-sṳ: Lí Siu-sṳ̀n

Birth name
- Chinese: 李以文
Transcriptions
Standard Mandarin
- Hanyu Pinyin: Lǐ Yǐwén
- Wade–Giles: Li^{3} Yi^{3}-wen^{2}
Wu
- Wugniu: Li^{6} i^{5}-ven^{6}
Hakka
- Pha̍k-fa-sṳ: Lí Yî-vùn

Li Xiucheng (Chinese: 李秀成; pinyin: Lǐ Xiùchéng; 1823 – August 7, 1864), born Li Yiwen (李以文), was a military commander of the Taiping Heavenly Kingdom, during the Taiping Rebellion against the Qing dynasty. He was born to a peasant family. In 1864, he was captured and interrogated following the third and final Battle of Nanjing. He was then executed by Zeng Guofan.

== Name ==
He was sometimes called the Loyal King (Chinese: 忠王; pinyin: Zhōng Wáng). This title was bestowed after he refused a bribe from a Qing general officer to kill Hong Xiuquan, the founder and leader of the rebellion.

== Biography ==
=== Second rout of the Jiangnan Army Group ===
Army Group Jiangnan (江南大營) was an important Qing army barracks in Nanjing. Forces led by Li Xiucheng besieged the barracks in an attempt to force its occupants to surrender. Beginning from March 1858 during the second encirclement, the Qing army commanded 200,000 soldiers to fight against Taiping forces, but they were routed by Li Xiucheng in May 1860. After that, Li went on to occupy all of Jiangsu provinces except Shanghai.

=== Nanjing ===
Li worked alongside fellow Taiping General Chen Yucheng to defend and release the capital during the siege of Nanjing in 1860.

=== Escape from Suzhou ===
Li Xiucheng's palace in Suzhou is the only one from the Taiping Rebellion era that still exists today. In July 1863, Li ordered his daughter's husband, Tan Shaoguang, to capture Suzhou. But Li Hongzhang led the Huai Army combined by the "Ever Victorious Army", which, having been raised by an American named Frederick Townsend Ward, was placed under the command of Charles George Gordon. With this support, Li Hongzhang gained numerous victories, leading to the surrender of Suzhou.

== Writing ==
Loyal Prince Li Xiucheng In His Own Words (Chinese: 《忠王李秀成自述》) is his autobiographical account written shortly before his execution.

== Li's sword ==
When Li withdrew from Suzhou, his sword, the symbol of his power, was given to his young brother Li Shixian. Li Shixian took this sword, but it was confiscated when he was captured by Charles George Gordon in Liyang. Charles George Gordon returned to the UK with Li's sword, and presented it to Queen Victoria's cousin, Chief Commander of the Military the Duke of Cambridge.

On 30 August 1961, the sword ended up in the hands of a history professor at the University of London. In 1981, this sword was returned to China, where it is currently stored in the National Museum of China.

== Children ==
Li Xiucheng had a son, Li Rongfa and three daughters. Li's daughters married Taiping generals, including Tan Shaoguang and Chen Binwen.

== Sources ==
- Li, Xiucheng (1976). Taiping Rebel: The Deposition of Li Hsiu-Ch'eng. Translated by Charles Anthony Curwen. Cambridge; New York: Cambridge University Press. ISBN 0521210828.
- Tiān Guó Zwi(天國志)
- 李秀成：太平天国后期军事统帅
- Hummel, Arthur W. Sr., ed. (1943). "Li Hsiu-ch'êng" . Eminent Chinese of the Ch'ing Period. United States Government Printing Office.
