= Western campaign =

Western campaign may refer to:

- Western Expedition, a military campaign against the Qing dynasty during the Taiping Rebellion
- Battle of France, a German military campaign against France and the Low Countries during World War II, known in German as the Western campaign (German: Westfeldzung)
- Western theater of the American Civil War
