= Private and public schools in China =

Chinese public and private schools

Education in People's Republic of China
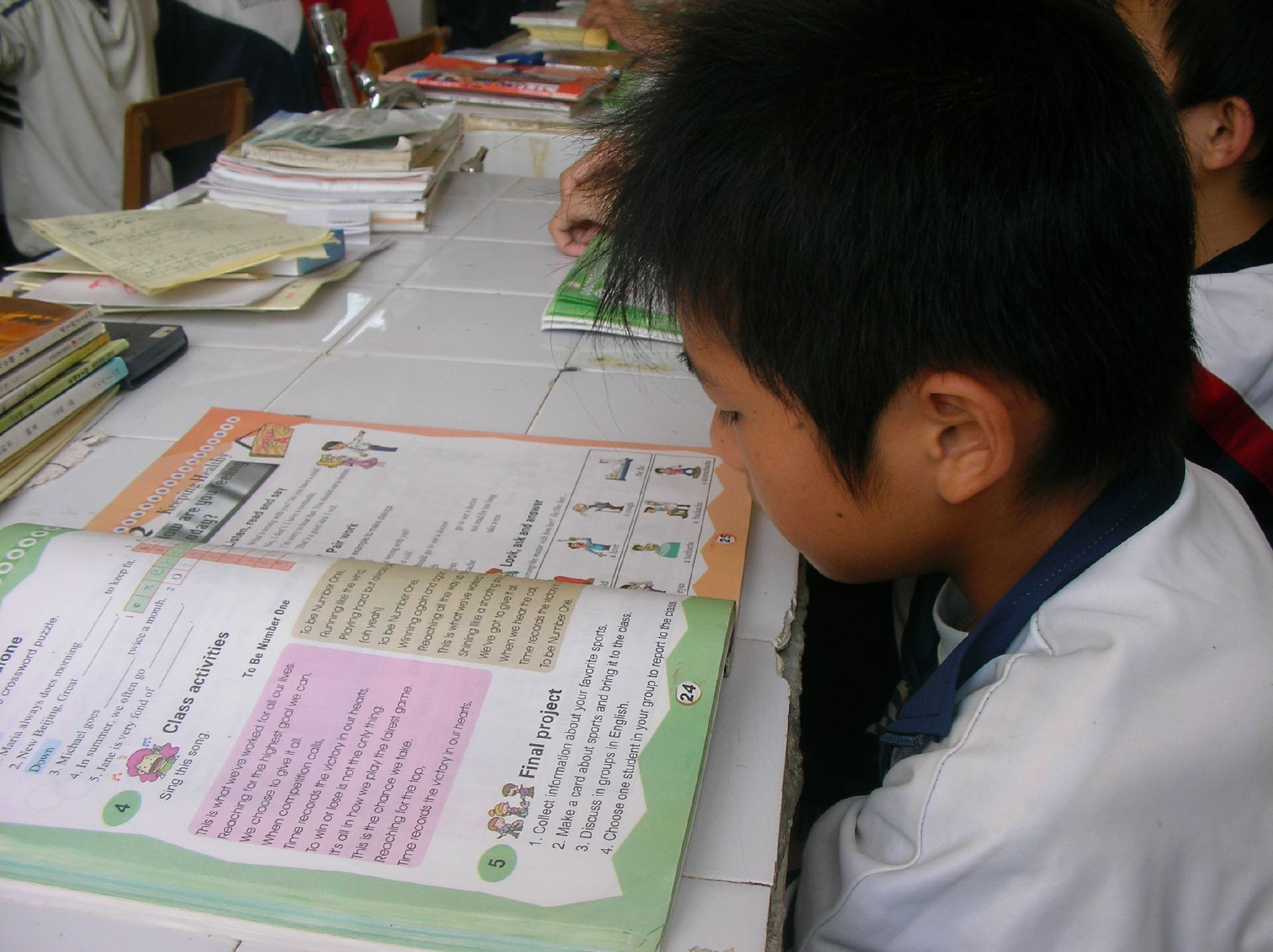

Ministry of Education
- Minister of Education: Huai Jinpeng

National education budget (2018)
- Budget: $685 billion (USD)

General details
- Primary languages: Mandarin
- System type: Government and private
- Established Compulsory education: 1 July 1986

Literacy
- Total: 96.84%
- Male: 98.47%
- Female: 95.16%

Enrollment
- Total: (N/A)
- Primary: 103.4 million (2018)
- Secondary: 39.3 million (2018)
- Post secondary: 38.3 million (2018)

Public schools in China are administered by the National Ministry of Education. Whilst the Ministry supervises general guidelines such as staff recruitment, national budgets and formal examinations, specific regulations directly correlated to each public school are managed by their District and Provincial Commissions of Education. The government is responsible for all aspects of the public education system, including but not limited to staff salaries, yearly curriculum, internal assessments and external rankings.

Private schools in China are administered by private individuals or corporations. Unlike public schools which are managed by the government, each private school's independent board of directors is responsible for tasks such as staff and student recruitment, salaries, principal assignment and student fees.

== History ==
=== Public schools ===
Following the formation of the People's Republic of China in 1949, the government announced that workers were the most important class in society. As such, the Ministry of Education established that henceforth, education must be made accessible to all workers, in order to favour the development of the country. By 1950, when the nation's first middle schools and universities commenced, all staff involved were given welfare entitlements like other proletariat members in the public division. This establishment of the new Chinese education system was constructed upon a combination of the Soviet model and elements of traditional China.

Throughout the 1900s, public education was subjected to several variations. In particular, these temporary changes were a result of the 1958 Chinese educational revolution. As the development of the proletariat was prioritized, education gradually became combined with labour and production. Most schools were converted to half-study and half-labour schools, and many started to experiment with new systems of education on their own. Consequently, procedures, school organizations and the initially established education form from 1949 were terminated. During this time, the chairman of the People's Republic of China, Mao Zedong, also declared that students would be re-allocated to rural areas. The reason behind this was his belief that students would be able to learn the most from labour workers. Hence, from 1966 to 1976 during the Cultural Revolution, more than 16 million students were pulled out of school in order to be re-educated by working in the countryside. The policy of school education only resumed after 1977, when the Gang of Four political faction lost power.

=== Private schools ===
Unlike public institutions, schools administered by private bodies were established very early on in China. However, despite their being a fundamental component of the early educational system, they were forced to either shut down or transfer ownership to the administration of the central government in 1952 following the 1949 revolution that formed the People's Republic of China. The direct order was released by the Chinese Ministry of Education, with the formal issue titled "The Direction of Transferring Private Primary and Private Middle School". This command was carried out in order for the economy to conform with the Soviet model the government wished to achieve – one that promoted a unified state management of education. It was not until 1992 that the re-emergence of private schools occurred, brought about by Deng Xiaoping. He referenced his speech in 1978 to restate his opinion on the linkage between education and science technology for the development of China. He declared that education was a necessity, due to its ability to drive the advancement of science and technology which he believed, was crucial for future expansion of China. He proclaimed that education could not rely on educational departments alone and stated the importance of support from industries and professions. Following this economic reform, the first private school to be re-established was Guangya Primary School in Sichuan province. It was the attention this first school received that drove the development of other private schools in the country. Ultimately, the increasing need for education combined with gradual reform of China's economic system expanded the development of private schools.

== Governance ==
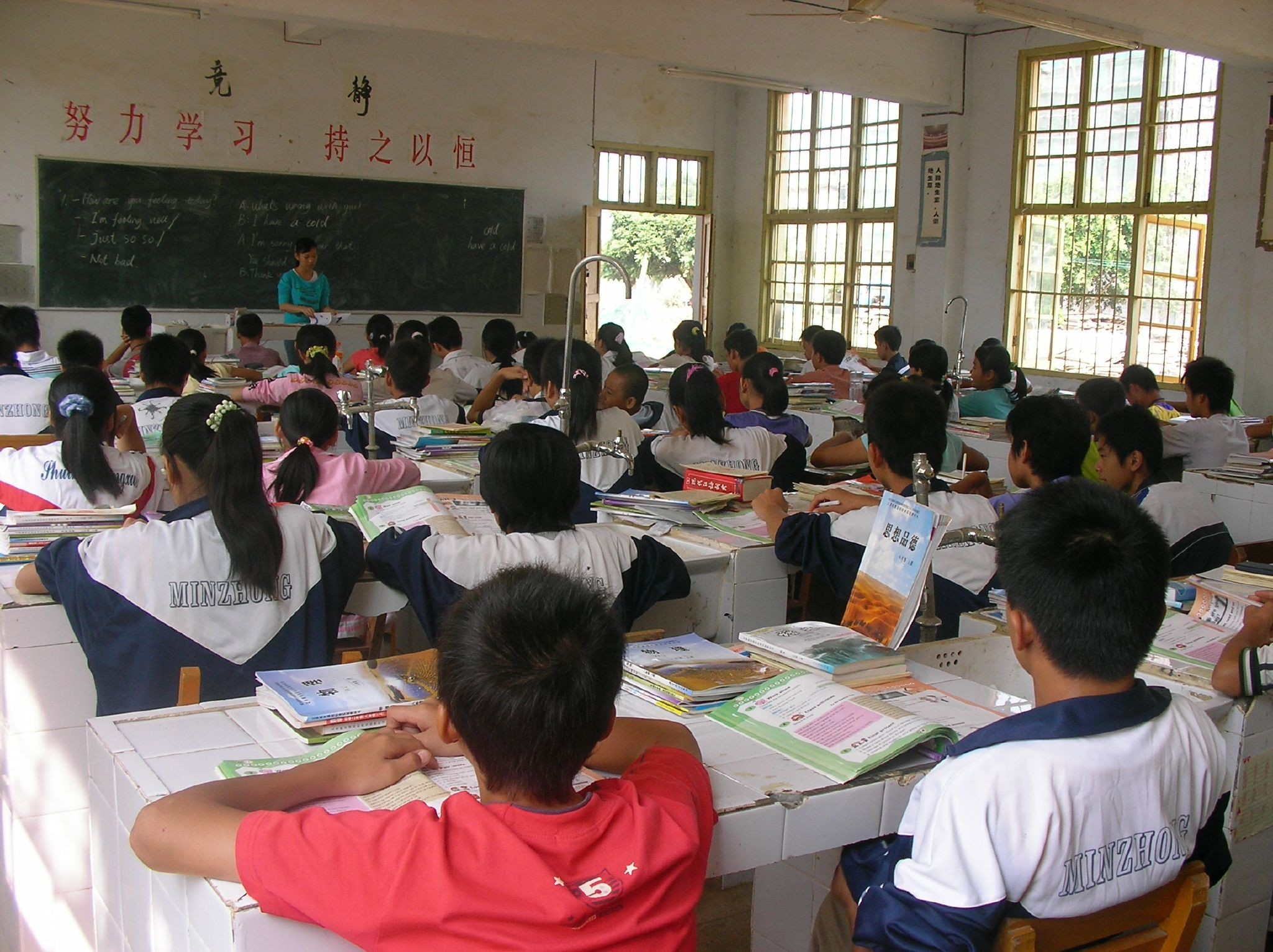
Students in Chinese Public School Classroom

Public schools in China maintain a centralised governance, in that its form of distributed leadership entails the school principal deciding and approving all necessary operations. The deputy principal aids in other facets of the school's implementation and decisions. Teachers, parents and student bodies also take various roles, where representatives may be chosen from each category to participate in decision-making and collective school discussions. As they consist of government policy and centralised leadership, public schools prioritize additional funding for better equipment and the enrolment of higher academically achieving students.

Private schools differ from public schools in that they were developed to be market-oriented and profit-driven. Rather than the principal's responsibility, school decision-making and implementation are instigated predominantly by market demand, i.e. the parents. As school acceptance is dependent on a student's family income basis rather than a student's academic achievements, private schools prioritize differently from government schools – focusing instead on preparation for overseas universities and the use of distinctive curricula.

== Quality and distribution ==
Various differences in conditions, geographical distribution and the quality of education exist between public and private schools. In urban areas, private schools offer more extensive resources, including well-equipped educational and sports facilities, a higher presence of foreign and bilingual English teachers, and dedicated school transportation services.

Another point of difference occurs in the geographical distribution of private and public schools across the nation. Whilst government schools are generally evenly spread, private institutions at secondary levels are more centralised in urban regions such as cities and towns.

== Finances ==
Although public schools are subsidised by the central government, various additional funding mechanisms are implemented in order to sustain a high-quality education. To reduce the Ministry's financial burden, all public schools must have a 'creation of income' channel that provides supplementary financial support. This is required as the government is only able to supply approximately 80 percent of all public educational expenditures. The remaining 20 percent is dependent on the funds generated from the school's 'creation of income' channel.

One such method is to accept extra pupils, otherwise known as 'Jiwaisheng' students. These are students whose formal examination results are marginally lower than the schools’ entrance boundary. To apply as a 'Jiwaisheng' student, parents must pay sponsorship fees to the school, where they will then be processed through an 'out of plan' channel for acceptance. The finance gained from this is used exclusively for acquiring higher-quality teaching equipment in order to improve the standard of school facilities.

Another method used to gain funding is business acquiring. Public schools are able to establish external companies, whereby a proportion of the profit generated by these companies is then offered to the school as a form of sponsorship. These external companies are often established in the design and computer technology industries.

Private schools receive no financial support from the government, thus allowing all educational funds to come from private sources. Whilst educational debentures were the primary form of support during the 1990s, this was later revised to a fee-paying system as it was recognised that an annual interest from banks was not able to generate sufficient educational funds. Generally, private schools charge an annual tuition fee of 5000 – 30,000 yuan depending on the level of education, as well as a one-time down payment of 20,000 – 50,000 yuan as part of their contribution to the school's construction fee. Typically, rural private schools charge less due to the geographical difference in students' socioeconomic backgrounds, with an outstanding fee of approximately 1,000 yuan per year.

In order for private schools to secure their financial condition, there are still various additional funding methods other than their annual fee payment. As private schools are owned by individuals or independent corporations, many are able to structure them as companies in the stock market as a means to strengthen their fiscal status. One common method involves linking the school to a real estate development project. As the enterprise achieves gradual success, the school will also receive continuous financial support provided by the firm.

== Student recruitment ==
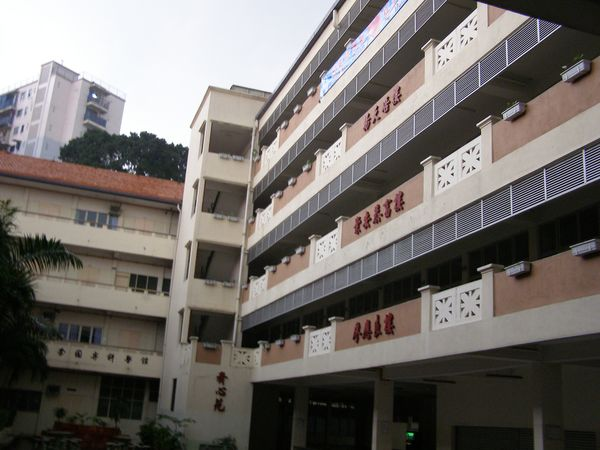
Chinese Private School Building

Government schools recruit students on the basis of two major factors: examination results and the local population. Each school has a minimum examination boundary mark for acceptance, in which students must pass in order to gain offered attendance. Public schools are also required to serve the district population by providing local citizens with education.

Private schools do not have a required academic barrier, as school acceptance is primarily based on the student's family income. They have complete independence during the process of student recruitment, and typically follow the school's self-determined criterion without local education department restrictions.

== Textbooks in public schools ==
=== Curricula ===
Unlike private schools have freedom of deciding their curricula to adapt to the international trends of education, the public high schools, under the regulation of Minister of Education of the People's Republic of China, have fixed curriculums and subjects. The main target of public education in China is to help the students score well in their college entrance examination. The department of education make all policies related to how the public school should work and set up goals for all the public schools to reach. However, even with the same subjects, the actual textbooks are varied based between provinces, for instance, there are textbooks from People's Education Press and Zhejiang Education Press.

=== Provinces using People's Education Press ===
High school textbooks in Chongqing, Shaanxi, Henan, Hubei, Guizhou, Hunan, Sichuan, Yunnan, Shanxi, Inner Mongolia, Qinghai, Gansu, Hebei, Guangxi, Jiangxi and other places are all from People's Education Press.

=== Provinces using Zhejiang Education Press ===
The ones used in Taizhou, Zhejiang are all from Zhejiang Education Press.

=== Reasons for different textbooks ===
According to the actual situation of the province's educational development, each province adopts different modes of education and propositions for the college entrance examination questions. In particular, the economic development in the western region is slow, the allocation of education resources in basic schools is not balanced, basic schools in remote mountainous areas in rural areas have poor educational conditions, educational resources are backward, the economic advantages of improving the quality of education and teaching, and the lack of motivation behind the support of educational resources are serious. All these factors restricted the development of basic education. To be fair for using different textbooks and different educational conditions, Minister of Education of the People's Republic of China adopts different models of the National College Entrance Examination.

=== National College Entrance Examination ===
As of the 2018, the National College Entrance Examination (also known as the gaokao), there are four types of college entrance examination questions and proposition models in all provinces and cities across the country. There are a total of national papers 1, 2, and 3 and semi-autonomous propositions (Hainan Province) and autonomous proposition forms. Among them, Zhejiang, Shanghai, Beijing, Tianjin, The five provinces and cities in Zhejiang fully implement autonomous propositions.

== Controversies in public schools ==
=== Grade segregation ===
Though each province in China adopts different modes of propositions for the college entrance examination according to the actual situation of the province's educational development, the grade segregation in public schools is still the debate of every year.

Grade segregation is intended to split students with good performance, average performance, and bad performance into different classes with different teachers. Hence, it becomes easier for the teachers to apply the optimal education according to the current academic situations of students.

=== Shortage of sleep ===
Excluding elementary schools, middle schools and high schools often have night section, where students go to school averagely from 7am to 10pm. Public schools in China have their fixed schedule determined by Minister of Education of the People's Republic of China.

== Types of private schools ==
Whilst most public schools fall under one main form – being government-run without significant variations, there are many different types of private schools. These include ‘Elite’ schools, Urban Ordinary schools, Vocational Technical schools, single-sex schools and rural private schools. Each school form possesses different characteristics and serves distinct clients.

=== 'Elite' private schools ===
'Elite' private schools typically receive students of famous entrepreneurs, foreigners and government officials. They charge the highest out of all private school tuition fees, ranging on average between 20,000 and 30,000 yuan per year (1990's figures; as of 2025, tuition typically exceeds 120,000 yuan per year). Characteristics distinct to this type of school include a low teacher to student ratio, boarding system and selected emphasis on areas such as computer science and English. They are also known to receive the most national publicity.

=== 'Urban Ordinary' private secondary schools ===
'Urban Ordinary' private secondary schools are generally located in suburban areas such as towns and cities. Their purpose is to admit students who failed their senior schools entrance exam, providing them with the opportunity to either re-take the exam or learn vocational skills before reaching the workforce. They typically emphasise the independence of curriculum arrangement, admission and teaching methods, where they prioritize the addition of supplementary courses in minority languages and arts on top of the required annual government curriculum.

=== 'Vocational Technical' schools ===
'Vocational Technical' schools were initially established in order to assist China's objective in creating more capital and skill intensive industries as opposed to ones that were labour-intensive and low skilled. The emphasis of this school type is usually on the learning and training in practical vocational skills, in that they serve students who wish to join the workforce immediately after graduation. These skill sets are often narrow, and programs catering to each set typically lasts between two and three years. Course subjects often include international trade, secretarial work, service and management mastery, cooking and commercial English. As these schools prioritize student employment, they are therefore often connected to multiple government organisations and businesses. Some vocational technical schools are also administered as a franchise.

=== Rural private schools ===
Rural private schools are situated in remote villages and townships. Their annual tuition fees are the lowest out of all private schools, in order to support their priority in providing basic education accessibility in rural areas. They consist of a larger percentage of primary schools than secondary schools.

=== Private schools set up by the government ===
Private schools set up by the government are passed down from the mid 1990s, during which the central government had approved the negotiation for a number of public schools to be contracted to private individuals for management. Whilst they draw on the private aspect of relying on annual student tuition fees to run, they do however, have free use of school buildings. Due to this, many local governments are willing to invest large amounts of money into their construction. Unlike other private schools, they do not have the ability to freely set the annual tuition fee. Instead, they are required to oblige with the government's tuition fee standards, which usually range between 4,000 and 15,000 yuan per year. The specific amount is dependent upon the policy of the school's local government.
