= Hushu Subdistrict, Nanjing =

Hushu Subdistrict 湖熟街道
- Subdistrict
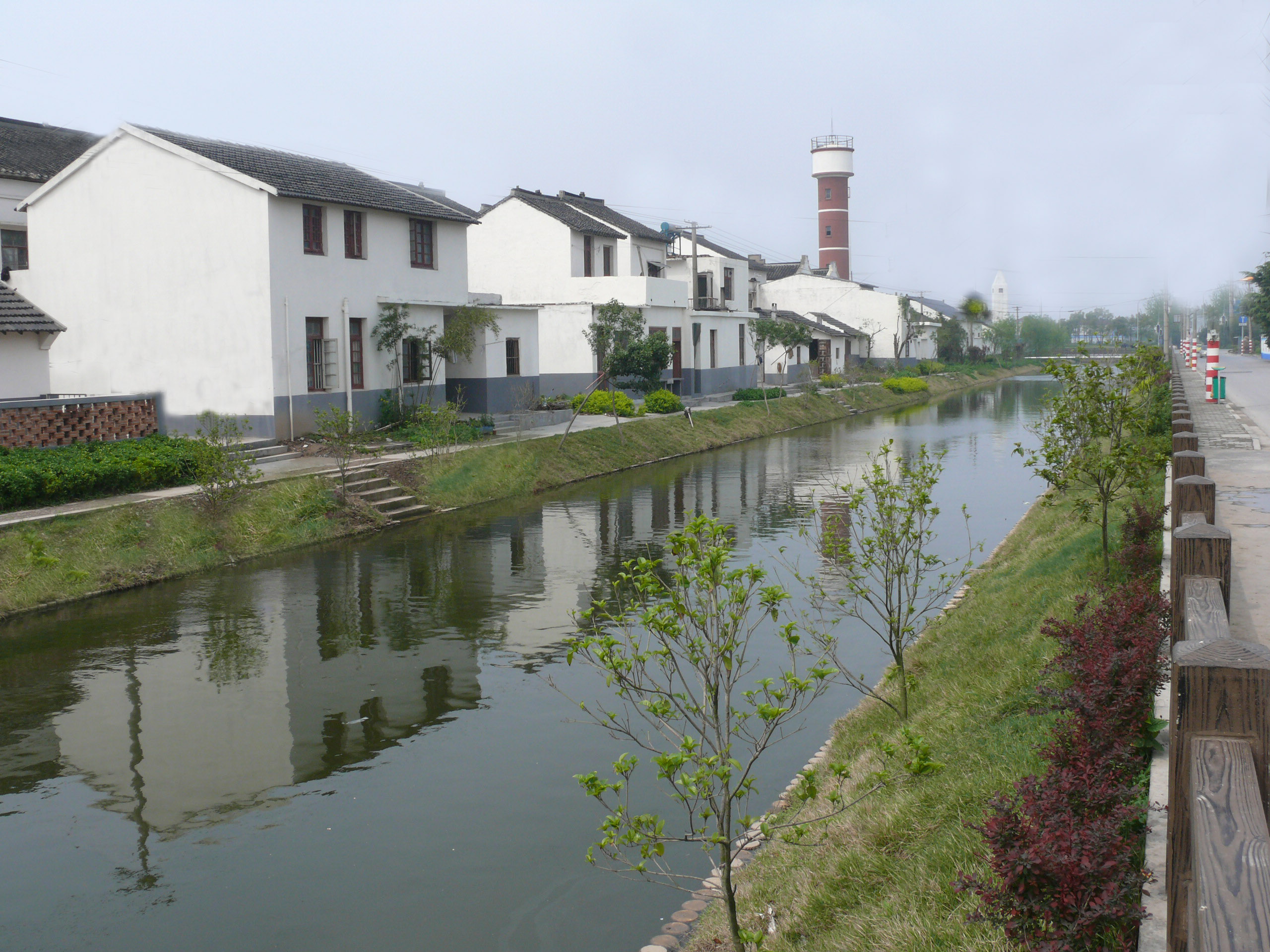
- Houses in Hushu Subdistrict

- Hushu Subdistrict in Jiangsu Hushu Subdistrict (China)
- Coordinates: 31.86°N 118.99°E
- Country: China
- Province: Jiangsu
- Prefecture-level City: Nanjing
- District: Jiangning District

Area
  - Total: 145 km^{2} (56 sq mi)

Population
  - Total: 80,200
  - Density: 553/km^{2} (1,430/sq mi)

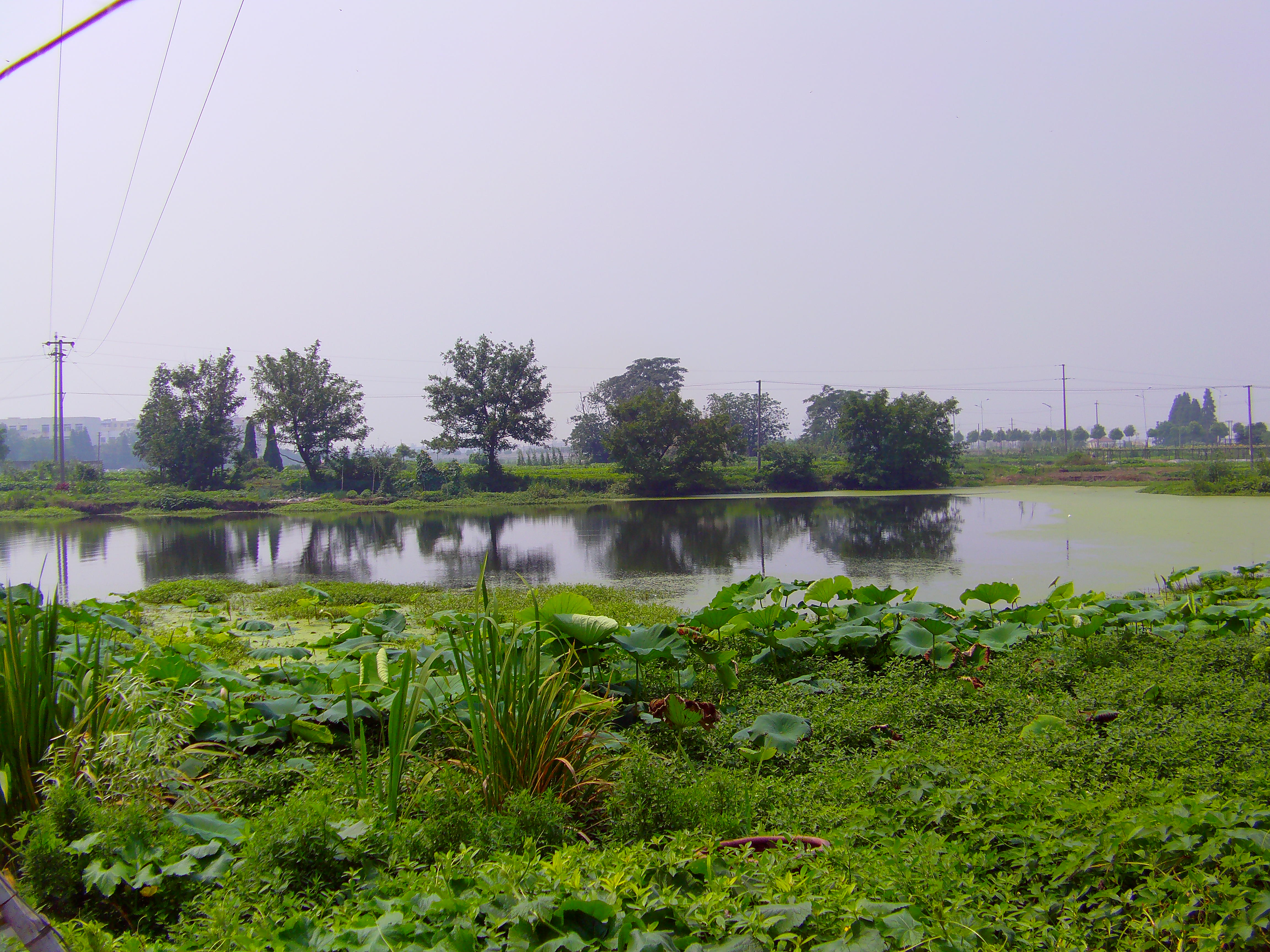
View of Hushu

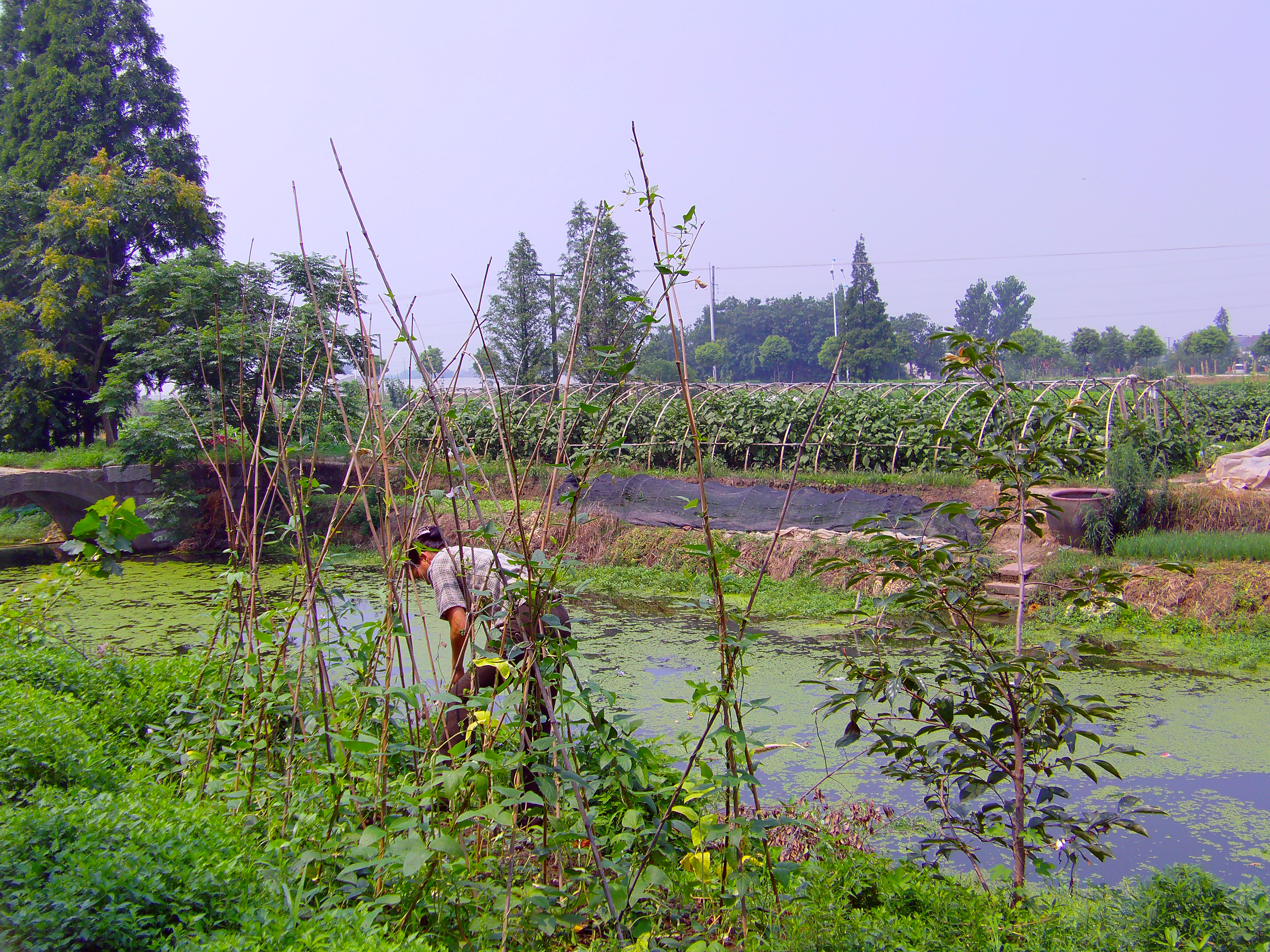
Rice field in Hushu

Hushu Subdistrict (Chinese: 湖熟街道; pinyin: Húshú Jiēdào), known as "Little Nanjing", is a subdistrict located in Jiangning District of Nanjing, Jiangsu province, China. Hushu has a total land area of 145 square kilometers. It was formed by merging Hushu, Zhougang, Longdu with a population of about 80,200.

== History ==
Hushu is the location of the Hushu culture (湖熟文化), which is an estimated 4,000 to 5,000 years old. This culture was first discovered in Hushu, where a great deal of pots and agricultural tools were unearthed.

The area is also an important Islamic center in Nanjing, with a local mosque dating back over 600 years.

=== 21st century ===
==== Village merger ====
In 2006, Hushu consolidated many of its administrative villages, which decreased the number of villages from 38 to 22. This change sought to make administering Hushu more efficient.

==== Cleaning of rivers and ponds ====
In 2006, the government of Hushu Town invested 1.9 million yuan to clean rivers and ponds. This project cleaned 11 rivers and 33 ponds, and improved water storage and flood prevention.

==== Educational expansion ====
In 2006 the government of Hushu invested 6.6 million yuan in the improvement of educational environment. This improvement contained 3 parts: the first part is the construction of the new building of Longdu Primary School, the second part is the extension of Hushu Middle School, and the last is the construction of a new mess hall of Hushu Primary School.

==== Child welfare expansion ====
In 2006, a rescue station for left-behind children, who live with their grandparents and are left by their parents working in city for more economic opportunity, was established in Hushu. This rescue station for left children was the first one all over China at that time. Up to now, over one hundred children have gotten help from some old party members and cadres.

==== Rest estate development ====
In 2006, intending to speed up the growth of local economy, the government of Hushu accelerated the development of real estate. The construction of buildings like Lujin Garden in Zhougang and a business street featuring the style of the Qing Dynasty was finished at this year.

== Administrative divisions ==
Hushu Subdistrict is divided into 14 residential communities and 8 administrative villages.

== Economy ==
The industrial district of Hushu was built in July 1992, covering an area of nearly 400,000 square meters, with companies like the Jincheng Group, Japanese Suzuki Motor Corporation, Jinbo Group, and Nanjing Yonghu Electronics Co.

Major agricultural products from Hushu include ducks, prawn, and rice.

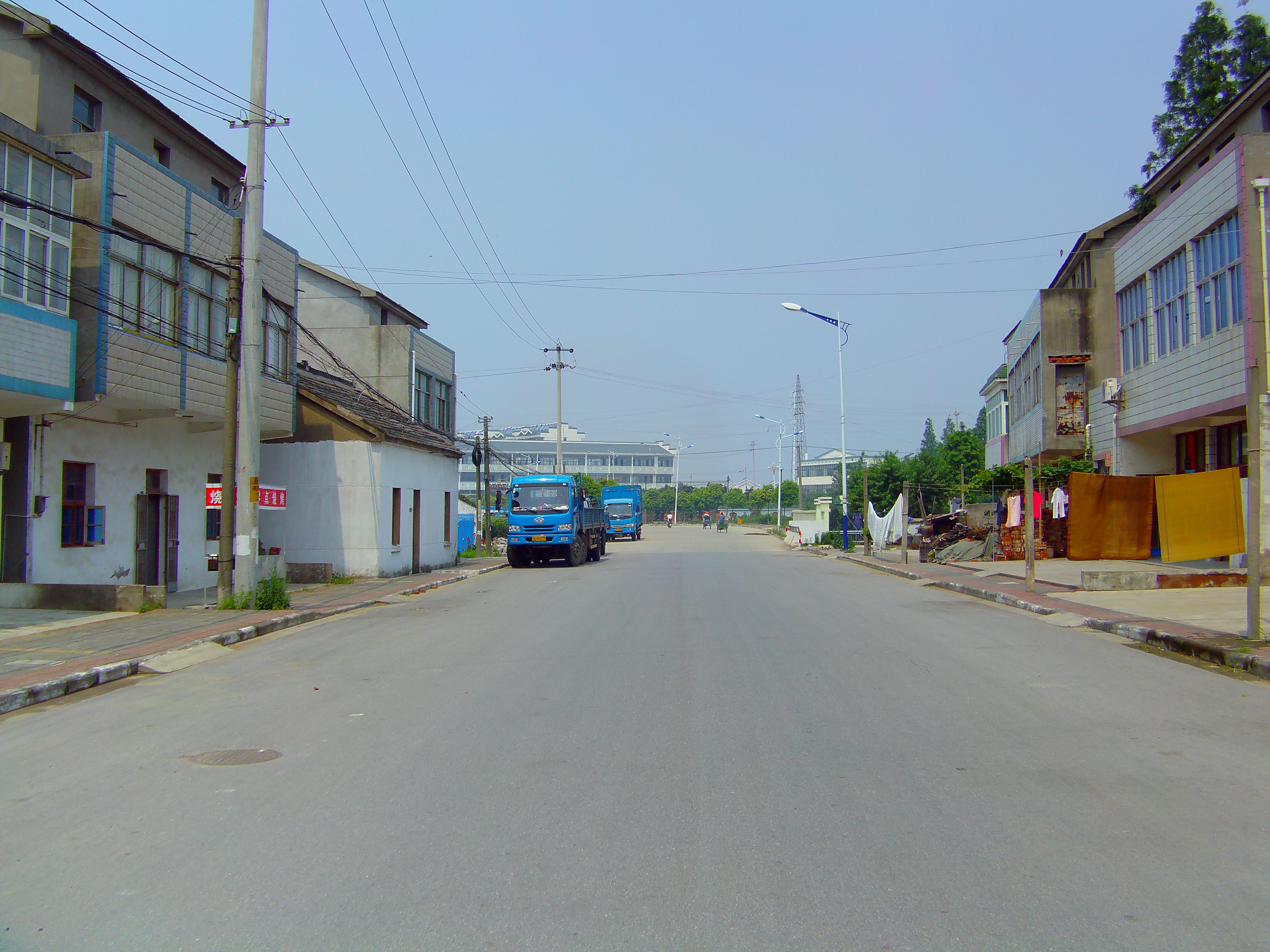
New road of Hushu Town
