= Liu Mingchuan =

Chinese general and politician (1836–1896)

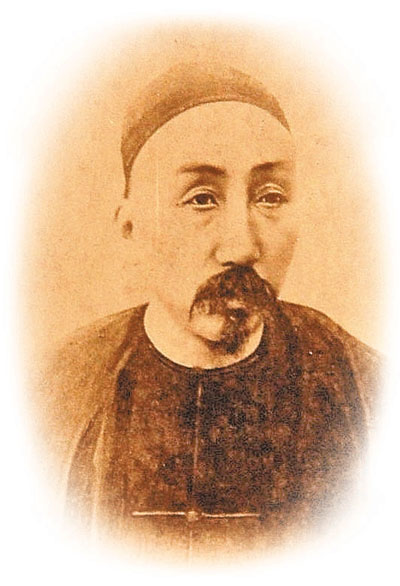
- Liu Mingchuan

Governor of Taiwan
- In office 12 October 1885 – 4 June 1891
- Preceded by: position created, Taiwan previously part of Fujian province
- Succeeded by: Shao Youlian

Personal details
- Born: 7 September 1836 Hefei, Anhui, Qing Empire (in present-day Feixi County)
- Died: 12 January 1896 (aged 59) Hefei, Anhui, Qing Empire
- Awards: Baron First Class, Order of Succession (一等男爵, 世襲), 1868
- Nickname(s): "Pockmark-faced Liu" (劉麻子)

Military service
- Allegiance: Qing Empire
- Branch/service: Huai Army
- Years of service: 1853–1868; 1884–1885
- Rank: Captain-General
- Commands: Captain-General of Army in Zhili (直隸陸路提督) (1864–1868); Imperial Commissioner for Military Affairs in Taiwan (欽差督辦臺灣軍務) (1884–1885)
- Battles/wars: Taiping Rebellion; Battle of Changzhou (1864); Nien Rebellion (1865–1868); Battle of Inlon River (1867); Sino-French War (1884–1885); Battles of Keelung (1884–1885)

Liu Mingchuan
- Traditional Chinese: 劉銘傳
Transcriptions
Standard Mandarin
- Hanyu Pinyin: Liú Míngchuán
- Wade–Giles: Liu Ming-ch‘uan

Courtesy name
- Chinese: 省三
- Literal meaning: 3rd Visitor
Transcriptions
Standard Mandarin
- Hanyu Pinyin: Xǐngsān
- Wade–Giles: Hsing-san

Liu Mingchuan (traditional Chinese: 劉銘傳; ; pinyin: Liú Míngchuán) (7 September 1836 – 12 January 1896), courtesy name Xingsan, was a Chinese military general and politician during the late Qing dynasty. He was born in Hefei, Anhui. Liu became involved in the suppression of the Taiping Rebellion at an early age, and worked closely with Zeng Guofan and Li Hongzhang as he emerged as an important Huai Army officer. In the aftermath of the Sino-French War, succeeding Ding Richang he was appointed the first governor of the newly established Taiwan Province. (Note: The official title of the province had remained "Taiwan-Fujian" for the first three years after the restructuring. Although Liu had planned to place the new provincial seat in an area corresponding to the contemporary Taichung, he was compelled to establish his new xunfu yamen (governor's office) in Taipei by lack of funds to create a new capital city.) Today he is remembered for his efforts in modernizing Taiwan during his tenure as governor, and several institutions have been given his name, including Ming Chuan University in Taipei.

== Early life and military career ==
Liu was born into a poor family of farmers at Hefei, Anhui Province. His father died when Liu was 11 years old. At age 18, Liu joined a local gang of bandits in the mountains, and at 20 he took part in the early Nien Rebellion. At 23 he changed his mind and joined the Huai Army, beginning his loyalty to the Qing Empire.

In 1859, during the Taiping Rebellion, he built his hometown's army, encouraged people to join, and suppressed several rebellions of the Taiping Army. In 1861, he led about 500 men to join Li Hongzhang's Huai Army. He was made the head of Ming Jhi Camp (銘字營), and went with Li to Shanghai to aid Charles George Gordon's army in defeating the Taiping Army. There he learned the use of Western firearms. In 1864 Huai Army commander Li Hongzhang and vice commander Liu attacked Changzhou to recover the city. Major General Liu was promoted to Colonel General and appointed to defend the capital at Beijing.

The Qing government promoted him to be the local provincial head. He followed Zeng Guofan to suppress the bandits around Anhui and Hupei. The bandits were suppressed after four years, and he was promoted to Baron First Class. Apart from providing occasional support to the military, he then resigned from his position due to illness.

== Sino-French War ==
In 1884, France and the Qing triggered the Sino-French war over the possession of Vietnam. That same year, Liu arrived in Taiwan as Imperial Inspector Minister on Military Affairs. He planned and supervised the construction of forts at Courbet Harbor, An-Ling Tun, Tsien Tung, and others.

In June 1884, Liu was appointed imperial commissioner for the defense of Taiwan against a threatened French invasion. On 5 August 1884 Rear Admiral Sébastien Lespès destroyed three Formosan shore batteries in the port of Keelung in north Taiwan by naval bombardment. The French put a landing force ashore to occupy Keelung and the nearby coal mines at Pei-tao (Pa-tou), but on 6 August were counterattacked by a strong Qing force under Liu Mingchuan's command and forced to re-embark.

Liu's leadership over the Huai Army enabled the Sinos to match up against the French forces in combat.

The French returned to northern Formosa in October 1884. On 1 October, 1,800 French marine infantry went ashore at Keelung and captured the town, supported by naval gunfire from French ships in the harbor. Liu Mingchuan attempted to defend Keelung with a Qing division of 2,000 troops, but was forced to retreat. Anticipating that the French would follow up their success with a landing at Tamsui, he left half of his force in strong defensive positions around Lok-tao (六堵), astride the road to Tamsui, and retreated to Taipei with the rest on 3 October. It was rumoured that he intended to flee south to Tek-cham (modern-day Hsinchu), and his arrival in Taipei was greeted with rioting. Several of his bodyguards were killed and he himself was arrested and held for several days in the city's Lungshan temple.

Meanwhile, after an ineffective naval bombardment on 2 October, Admiral Lespès attacked the Formosan defenses at Tamsui with 600 sailors from the Far East squadron's landing companies on 8 October, and was decisively repulsed by forces under the command of General Sun Kaihua, a veteran Xiang Army officer. French casualties in the battle of Tamsui were light, but as a result of this reversal French control over Formosa was limited to the town of Keelung. This achievement fell far short of what had been hoped for, and condemned the French to a long and frustrating campaign around Keelung.

== Governor of Taiwan ==
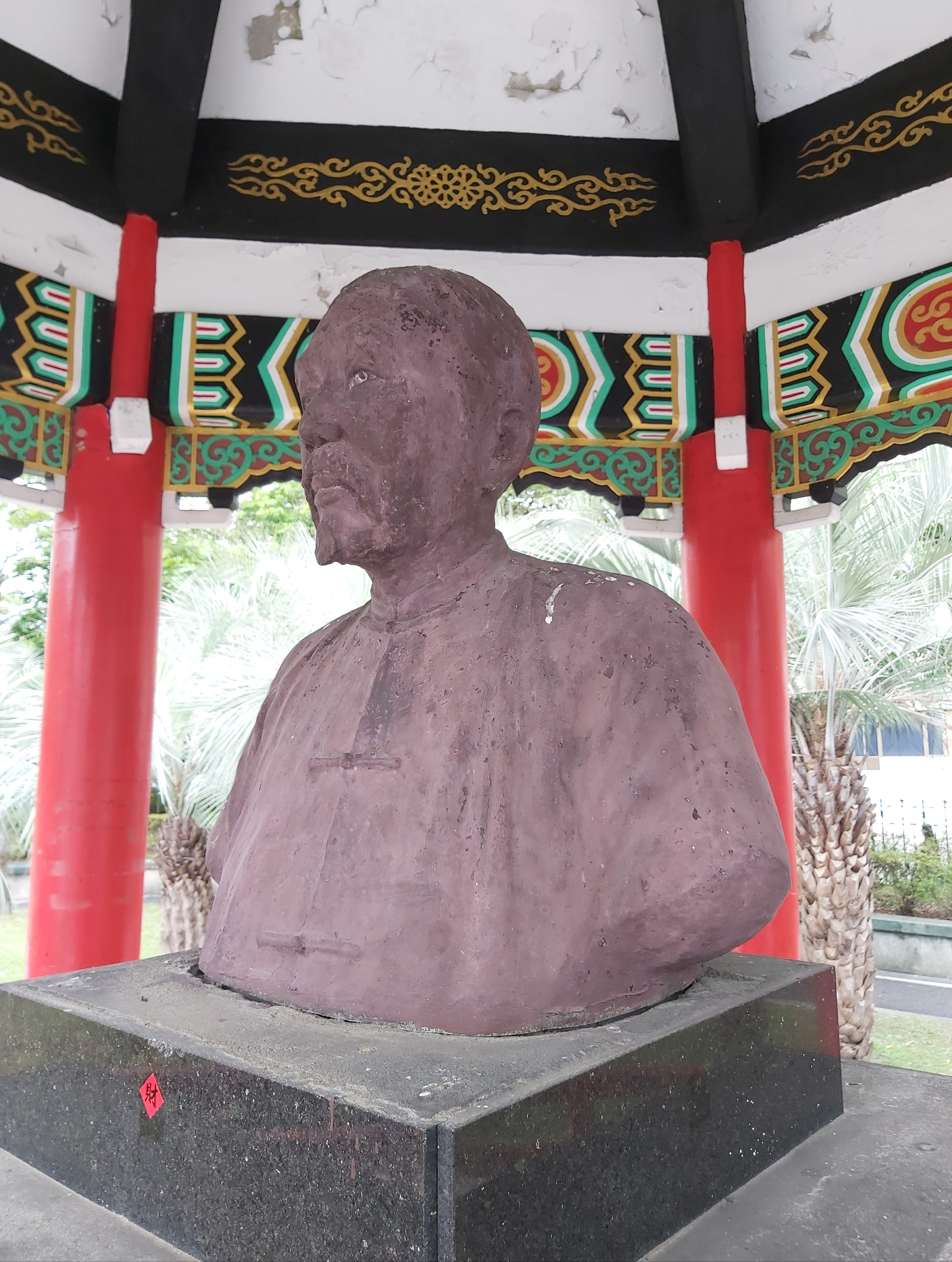
Bust of Liu Mingchuan location at 228 Peace Memorial Park, Taipei.

By a decision of the Qing court, Taiwan Province was declared an independent province in 1887. (Note: This was done by moving the government of the original "Fujian-Taiwan Province" to Taiwan, cancelling the Governorship of Fujian, and then entrusting the governance of Fujian to the Viceroy of Min-Zhe – leaving much room for jurisdictional confusion.) Liu Mingchuan did not see the creation of a separate province on Taiwan as a priority; rather, he emphasized the urgency of upgrading the defense industry in Taiwan and having a naval unit stationed in the ports around the island. Having never gotten full support from the mainland's Imperial court and the navy presence he wanted, Liu is instead remembered for his efforts to lay the foundation of modern infrastructure in Taiwan as its first provincial governor. He continued and enlarged Shen Baozhen's ideals for managing Taiwan, and started a massive modernization programme that included setting up defenses, developing transportation, taxation, farming, public security, commercial enterprises, financial affairs, and education. Construction works including telegram, railway, army machinery, telegram schools, Western schools, and modern forts, in addition to purchasing modern artillery and rifles.

Liu promoted a series of Western-style architectural developments, including the headquarters of Taiwan's Telegraphy (辦理臺灣水路電報總局, 1892), Taipei Machinery Car Repair Factory (臺北機關車修理廠), an iron bridge, Western Supervising Dormitory (洋監督宿舍), and Western School (西學堂, 1890). In 1886, under the support of German military engineer Max E. Hecht, he built nine modern Western-style forts, including Keelung Sheliao Fort (基隆社寮砲臺), Uhrshawan Battery, Hobe Fort, Daping Mountain Fort (旗後大平山炮台, destroyed), Penghu West Castle Fort (湖西大城北砲臺), Penghu West-Islet Fort (西嶼砲臺), Penghu Mazu Fort (金龜頭砲臺), and Anping Fort.

Under Liu's auspices, a 28.6 km railroad connecting the cities of Keelung and Taipei (see Taiwan Railways Administration) became the earliest railroad system of China when it came into operation with nine Europe-made steam locomotives in 1891. An undersea telegraph line between Tamsui and Fuzhou was laid during his tenure. He sponsored the exploitation of coal using new technologies in northern Taiwan and the creation of a modern postal service. Liu's governance saw China's earliest nighttime electrical illumination when the walled prefecture city of Taipei was lightened up with street lamps in 1887. However, those lights would be turned off after the initial trial period due to a lack of operating funds.

Despite that these projects were limited in scope and scale, they were carried out against strong opposition and plagued with financial difficulties. Unassisted by the Qing court, the governor resorted to a series of radical means of funding his projects. These included forcefully seizing control of some areas traditional inhabited by aboriginal tribes in the northern part of the island province and imposing a land census on the island's landowning class to expand camphor and tea production and increase tax revenues. Some of the repercussions of these measures would work to suffocate Liu's plans for Taiwan and his political career. On 6 October 1888 a mob of land-owning farmers and militia revolted (施九緞事件) in Changhua County, attacking Qing officials led by Li Jiatang (李嘉棠), a county magistrate who had threatened to use capital punishment when carrying out the land census.

A longtime animosity between the Xiang and the Huai Armies is believed to be another factor in Liu's eventual political frustration. Liu Ao (劉璈), a Xiang Army veteran officer and Superintendent of Military Affairs in Taiwan (臺灣兵備道), was Liu Mingchuan's arch opponent when he took office. Although Liu Mingchuan succeeded in purging Liu Ao from his jurisdiction by accusing the latter of various misdeeds, which led to the latter's exile as a guarded prisoner to Heilongjiang in 1885, the governor himself was never free from targeted attacks as a representative figure of the Huai faction in the government and as an important associate of Li Hongzhang.

== Resignation and death ==
In June 1891, Liu Mingchuan resigned his post as governor of Taiwan for health reasons at the age of 56, and returned to his hometown in Anhui. Most of the modernization projects initiated by Liu came to a halt shortly after his resignation and were never restarted throughout the rest of the Qing reign over the island. This has led to speculation that Liu's resignation was actually due to political opposition in the Qing court to his work. Whether or not this is true, the policy reversal adopted by Liu's successors—affiliated with the Huai faction or not—illustrates the financial difficulties China's early modernizers faced while the empire's fiscal resources were spent on the creation of the Beiyang Fleet and the renovation of the Summer Palace.

After leaving Taiwan, Liu Mingchuan received no further official commissions and in 1895, Taiwan was ceded to Japan by the Treaty of Shimonoseki. Liu died in his hometown of Hefei in 1896, and was given the title of Grand Protector of the Crowned Prince (太子太保) and the posthumous name Zhuang Su (壯粛). Permission was granted to build a temple and have his biography written.

Before his death, he had mentioned Taiwan, looking to the East, where Taiwan lay. He cried: "Blue sky! Give me back Taiwan!", in sorrow for the victory of Japan over China and the colonisation of Taiwan by Japan.

=== Namesakes ===
Liu Mingchuan is greatly remembered in both mainland China and Taiwan. In Mainland China, the name of the township where Liu was born in Feixi County was changed to his name in 2006. Hefei No. 8 High School has a campus named after him in this township. In Taiwan, Ming Chuan University and several elementary and middle schools were named after him. There is also a road named after him in Keelung. The first Oliver Hazard Perry-class frigate purchased from the United States, which was later classified as Cheng Kung-class frigate No. 9, was also named after him.
