= Cheng Xueqi =

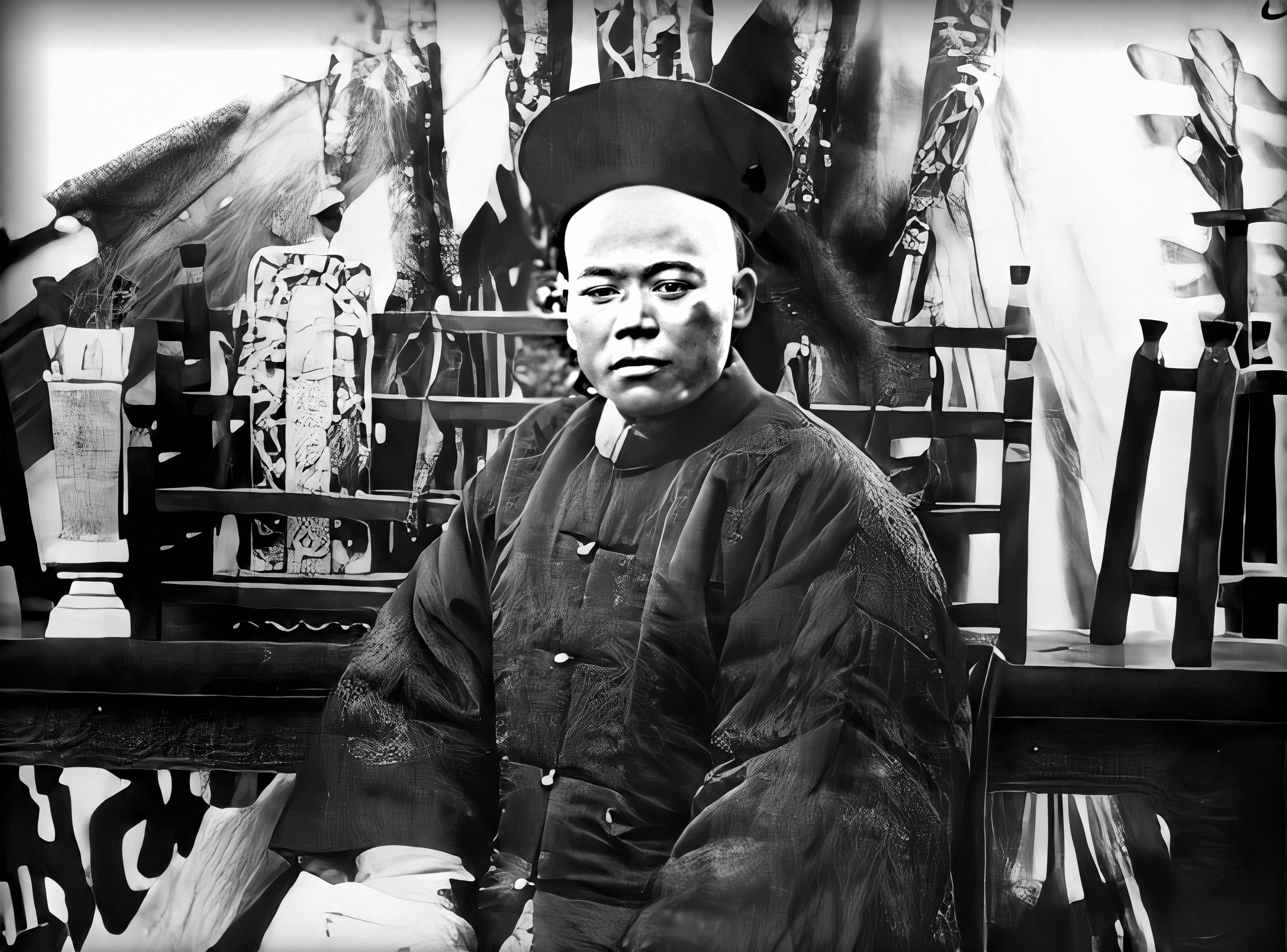
Cheng Xueqi

Cheng Xueqi (Chinese: 程學啟; courtesy name Fangzhong 方忠; born in Tongcheng, Anhui, (1828–1864) was a general of the Taiping Rebellion who surrendered to the Qing dynasty in 1861 with Ding Ruchang.In April 1861, he surrendered to Qing forces at Anqing with about 300 soldiers and was later incorporated into the Huai Army. He was an eminent Han Chinese official and a Captain General in the army of the late Qing dynasty. He led the Huai Army to fight effectively against the Taiping rebels and helped to restore the stability of Qing, along with other prominent figures, including Li Hongzhang and Zeng Guofan, setting the scene for the successful defense of Shanghai and the Suzhou Massacre POW Incident. The Tongzhi Emperor praised Cheng as "intelligent and brave".

== Fame and military campaigns ==
Zeng Guofan had been encouraged by Cheng: “You could learn from Zhang Guoliang, who defended the Jiangnan bravely before he died. Go ahead!” This reportedly inspired Cheng to adopt the tactic of attacking whenever and wherever possible. He was promoted to Lieutenant General in October 1862 (defended Shanghai, see Battle of Shanghai (1861)), and he created the first Chinese rifle troop in September 1862. In January 1863 Li Hongzhang ordered Cheng and Guo Songling to attack Taicang. He retook the cities of Taicang, Kunshan, Wujiang and was promoted to Captain General in May 1863. He also formed the first modern Chinese artillery unit. Cheng Xuechi was awarded a first class merit medal for retaking Jiangsu and 20 cities and defending Shanghai twice in two years. Li Hongzhang reported to Tongzhi Emperor．

== Death ==
In 1864, after laying siege to the city of Jiaxing for a month, he decided to find a way to end the siege. By utilizing thousands of kilograms of explosives, a breach was opened in the walls. He ordered his troops to immediately storm the city through the breach. As he led the charge up the ruined walls, a bullet struck him in the head. It was said that even after being shot he continued the charge. However, after a week he died from his wounds.The Chinese Text Project records his date of death as 4 May 1864. It was reported that he was content with his approaching death, finally being able to join his wife and sons in the afterlife (his family had been killed four years earlier by Taiping rebels). When Li Hongzhang reported to the Tongzhi Emperor that Cheng had died, both men began to weep.

== Awards ==
- created the royal BATURU (Manchu: the Brave) in June 1862 (defended Songjiang District successfully and promoted Major General).
- created Baron Yiyong of the Second Class, Order of succession 勇毅二等男爵, 世襲) in 1864
- created Three Excellencies, Crown prince's military first class master (太子太保)
- Offer a sacrifice Pantheon to him on Anqing and Suzhou.
