= Battle of Sanhe =

1858 battle of the Taiping Rebellion

- Part of the Taiping Rebellion
Date	November 7, 1858 – November 18, 1858
Location	Sanhe, Anhui, China
Result	Taiping rebel victory, due to Green Standard Army delay

Belligerents
Qing dynasty (Xiang Army)	Taiping Heavenly Kingdom

Commanders and leaders
(Qing dynasty) Li Xubin † (Qing dynasty) Zeng Guohua †	Chen Yucheng; Li Xiucheng; Zhang Lexing; Wu Dinggui (吴定规); Chen Kunshu

Strength
6,000	100,000+ (included Nien Rebellion 40,000 troops)

Casualties and losses
6,000 (Xiang Army)	Several thousands

The Battle of Sanhe (Chinese: 三河之戰, literally "Battle of Three Rivers") was a major engagement of the Taiping Rebellion, occurring in 1858. During this battle, the elite troops of Zeng Guofan's Xiang Army were lost, along with one of its most capable commanders, Li Xubin as well as Zeng Guofan's brother Zeng Guohua.

== Prelude ==
In August 1858 the Taiping Army took Luzhou (庐州), in modern-day Hefei, Anhui, and the Imperial governor of Hunan-Guangdong Guanwen (官文) ordered Li Xubin to counterattack by taking the cities and towns of Tongcheng, Shucheng, and Taihu (太湖). Imperial Jiangning General Duxing'a (都兴阿) and Li Xubin consequently led over 10,000 troops and attacked Anhui from Hubei. On September 22 imperial troops took Taihu (太湖). Afterwards, Li Xubin led 8,000 troops to continue the attack northward. On September 27 Li Xubin's imperial army took Qianshan. On October 13 they took Tongcheng, and on October 24 Shucheng. On November 3, after leaving behind 2,000 soldiers to guard the newly conquered towns, Li Xubin led the remaining 6,000 imperial troops to the outskirts of Sanhe ("Three Rivers"), around 25 km southeast of Shucheng.

Sanhe was located on the western shore of Lake Chao and was an important barrier of Luzhou and also an important transportation hub to supply provisions for both Luzhou and Nanjing. The city lacked a wall, so the Taiping Army constructed a new wall and, in addition, built a total of nine forts outside the newly built wall. The Taiping commander in charge of defending Sanhe was Wu Dinggui (吴定规). On October 24 Chen Yucheng had just succeeded in taking Liuhe (六合) and received the news that Sanhe was being besieged by imperial troops. Realizing the importance of the town, Chen Yucheng decided to reinforce Sanhe and asked Hong Xiuquan to send Li Xiucheng to strengthen the Taiping forces. Chen's request was granted. The nearby Nien Rebellion also sent 40,000 troops to strengthen the Taiping forces.

== Battle ==
On November 7 imperial troops attacked the Taiping army's forts on three fronts:

- Six battalions attacked Taiping forts in the regions of Henan Boulevard (Henandajie, 河南大街) and Mouse Trap (Laoshujia, 老鼠夹)
- Three battalions attacked Taiping forts in the region of Water Buddhist nunnery (Shui'an, 水庵) and Crystal Buddhist nunnery (Shuijing'an, 水晶庵)
- Two battalions attacked Taiping forts in the region of Zhujiayue (储家越)
- Two battalions personally led by Li Xubin acted as a reserve force.

After heavy casualties on both sides, the Taiping army abandoned all nine forts and retreated to safety behind the city walls. On November 7 Chen Yucheng's force reached Sanhe and set up camp in Golden Ox (Jinniu, 金牛) Town, just south of Sanhe. A week later Li Xiucheng's force also reached Sanhe and camped in the region of White Stone Mountain (Baishishan, 白石山). The Taiping army in the Sanhe region totaled more than 100,000 men and Li Xubin's staff officers suggested that the imperial force should withdraw to Tongcheng temporarily, since there were only 6,000 of them. Li Xubin refused and subsequently moved all of his forces into the newly taken forts to set up defensive positions.

Realizing the enemy had numerical superiority and he could not hold out for long, Li Xubin decided to launch a preemptive strike against Chen Yucheng's force. On the night of November 15 seven battalions of the imperial army were sent to attack the Taiping army at Golden Ox Town under the cover of darkness. Unbeknownst to the imperial troops, however, the Taiping army had already laid an ambush for them. At dawn on November 16 the imperial army clashed head-on with the vanguard of Chen Yucheng's Taiping army, which lured the entire seven battalions of imperial troops into the ambush. Over half of the seven battalions were killed and the remainder were surrounded. Li Xubin sent out another four battalions to rescue the surrounded imperial troops and personally led several dozen charges against the Taiping army positions, but all were beaten back with heavy loss of life.

Taiping army units under Li Xiucheng's command went out to support Chen Yucheng and Wu Dinggui's (吴定规) forces behind the city wall also sallied forth to attack the imperial army. Li Xubin had to retreat back to the forts with the surviving imperial troops in an attempt to hold their positions and await reinforcements. However, the 15,000 men of the imperial Green Standard Army were delayed and played no part in the battle. The imperial army was severely weakened and seven out of nine forts fell in a short time; even the fort where Li Xubin's headquarters was located found itself under siege. As Li Xubin attempted a breakout, he was killed in the fierce battle (some sources claim Li hanged himself from a tree). Zeng Guofan's younger brother Zeng Guohua (曾國華) was also killed, and both Li and Zeng's bodies were never found. By November 18 the battle was over.

== Aftermath ==
After their victory at Sanhe, Chen Yucheng and Li Xiucheng continued their offensive southward, and the imperial army had to abandon Shucheng and withdrew to Tongcheng. Soon afterwards, the Taipings won another battle at Jingdezhen, Jiangxi. On November 24 Li's and Chen's Taiping troops took Tongcheng. Imperial forces under the command of Duxing'a besieging Anqing risked being cut off from behind, and the siege had to be abandoned on November 27 with the imperial army withdrawing to Xiusong (宿松) via Shipai (石牌). The Taiping army subsequently retook Qianshan and Taihu (太湖).

== Outcome ==
The imperial defeat at Sanhe was a major setback. Not only were the newly conquered towns lost again, but the siege of Anqing was also relieved. In addition, the Taiping army expanded its territory as a result of the victory. The 6,000-strong imperial force represented the Empire's crack troops, and their loss would take a long time to recover from. This would have a severe impact on future operations against the Taiping rebels.
