= Huai Army =

- 淮軍
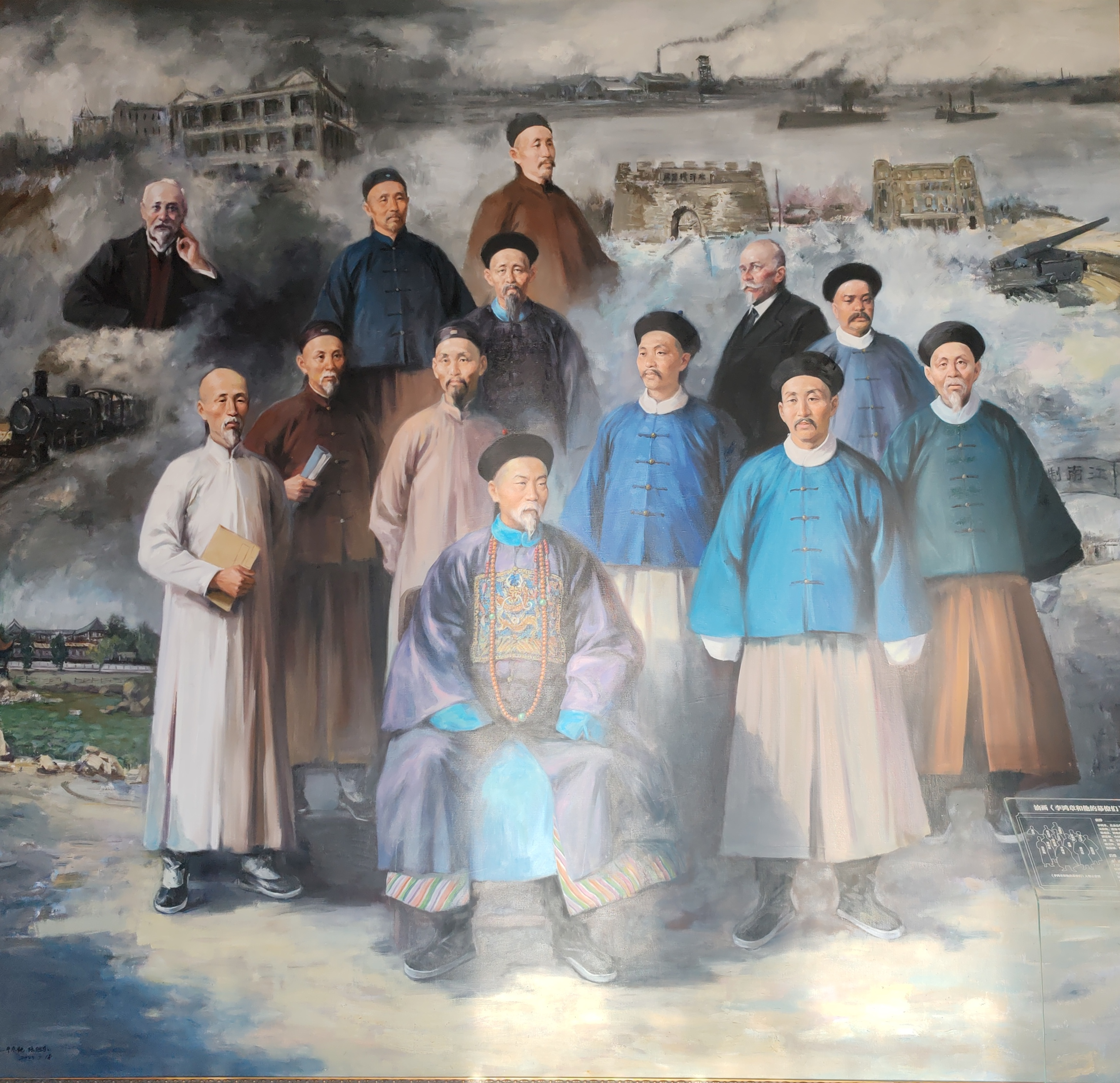
- Representative people of Huai Army
- Active: 1862–1911
- Country: China
- Allegiance: Emperor of the Qing dynasty
- Type: Militia
- Nickname: Anhui Army
- Equipment: Mixture of traditional and modern (19th century) weapons
- Engagements: Taiping Rebellion, Sino-French War, First Sino-Japanese War

Commanders
- Notable commanders: Li Hongzhang

The Huai Army (Chinese: 淮軍; pinyin: Huái jūn), named for the Huai River, was a military force allied with the Qing dynasty raised to contain the Taiping Rebellion in 1862. It was also called the Anhui Army because it was based in Anhui province. It helped to restore the stability of the Qing dynasty. Unlike the traditional Green Standard Army or Eight Banners forces of the Qing, the Huai Army was largely a militia army, based on personal rather than institutional loyalties. It was armed with a mixture of traditional and modern weapons. Li Hongzhang, a commander in the Xiang Army, created the Huai Army in October 1861. It succeeded Zeng Guofan’s Xiang Army. The Huai Army itself was succeeded by the New Army and the Beiyang Army, which were created in the late 19th century, though it continued to exist until the end of the dynasty in 1911.

== Founding ==
Before recovering Anqing in late 1861, Zeng Guofan ordered his student Li Hongzhang to bring some of the Xiang Army back to Anhui, Li's homeland, for military service and to organize an independent force under Li Hongzhang's command. Their total strength was 25,000 soldiers, including some Taiping soldiers in Anqing who had surrendered. Li combined these forces into one army, and after three months of training they fought their first battle, the Battle of Shanghai (1861).

Li Hongzhang was in overall command of the Huai Army, which was part of the new series of regional armies known as the Yong Ying, introduced in China after the Nian Rebellion. Unlike the Manchu Eight Banners or the Green Standard Army, officers in these regional armies were not rotated; they chose the soldiers under their command and formed paternalistic relationships with them. These armies were equipped with modern weapons.

== History ==
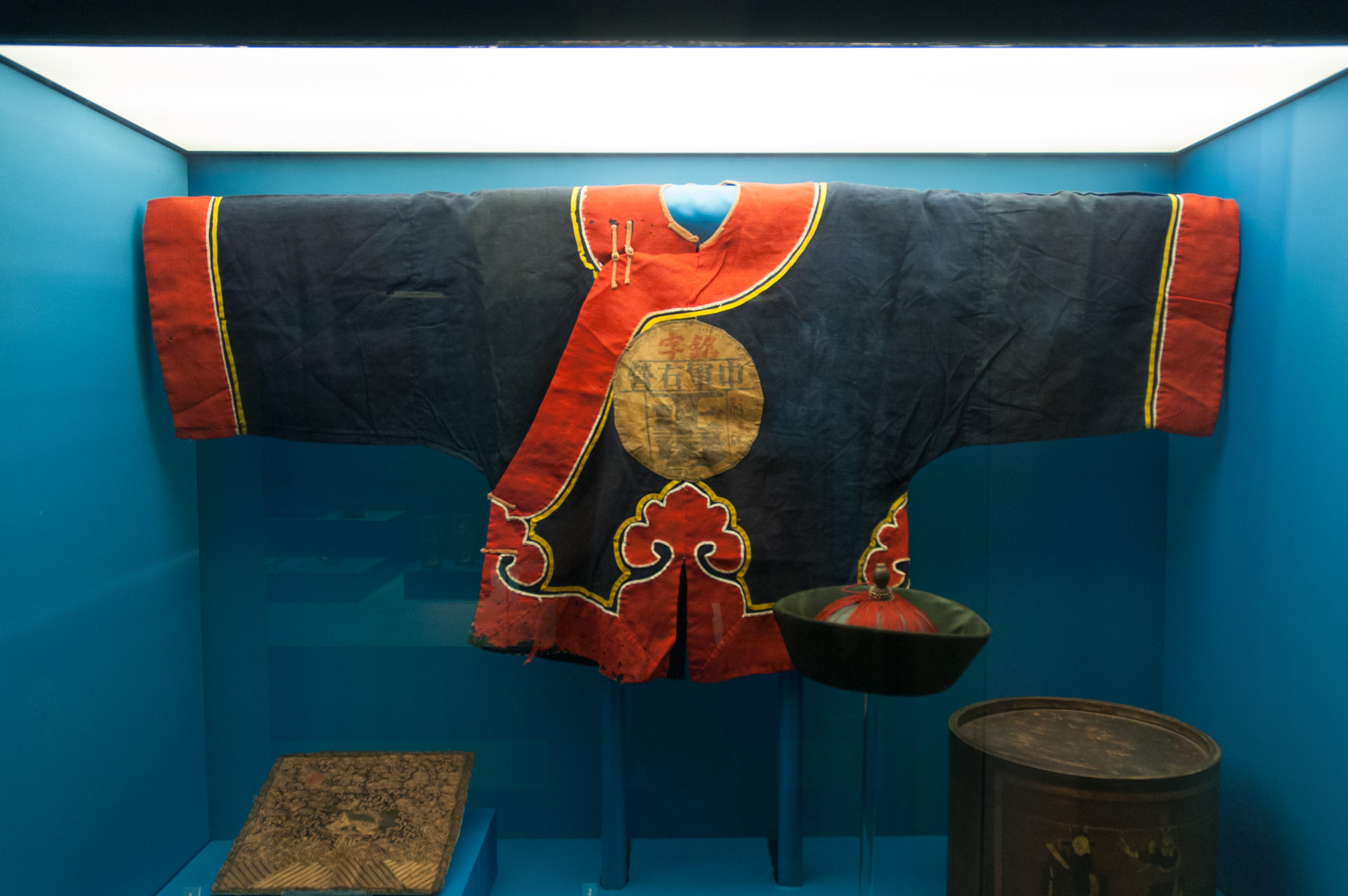
Uniform of a division of the Huai Army

Officers from the Anhui Army such as Zha Lianbiao also studied Western military drill overseas in Germany.

General Zhou Shengchuan was the tongling (commander) of one of the Anhui Army's best units in Zhihli. He encouraged the purchase of modern, foreign weapons to Li Hongzhang. The Anhui Army's paternalism and the relationships between soldiers and officers was praised by Zhou, who also practiced nepotism in his unit.

Western military drill was implemented by Zhou, with officers being encouraged to participate. Rewards and punishments were implemented for respectively good and bad marksmanship, with "badges of merit" and money given out.

Zhou was extremely interested in modern technology such as medicine, telegraphs and railways, criticizing British advisor Charles Gordon for not considering their extensive use in war. Li Hongzhang's German instructor officers were criticized by Zhou over their lack of knowledge of prone firing and fighting at night. Westerners and Japanese praised his troops, and they were considered "first-rate". Zhou said that a '"twilight air" had settled upon the force after two decades, and its performance declined.

Non-commissioned officers in the Anhui Army were given "special training".

Li Hongzhang gave high-ranking officer posts in the Green Standard Army of Zhili to officers from the Anhui Army.

Units of the Anhui Army served in combat against the French in Tonkin and Formosa during the Sino-French War. Although they were occasionally victorious, they lost most of the battles they fought.

Anhui Army troops were stationed in various provinces across China, such as Zhili, Shanxi, Hubei, Jiangsu, and Shaanxi by the government, around 45,000 in total. They also fought in the First Sino-Japanese War.

General Liu Mingchuan's leadership over the Anhui Army enabled the Chinese to match up against the French forces in combat on Taiwan.

When the French attempted to seize Taiwan's Keelung forts and attack near Tamsui, they were beaten back by the Anhui soldiers under General Liu.

Most of the Huai army officers did not hold official degrees and titles, since after the modernization introduced into the Chinese military, more common people rather than scholars began to enlist in military service.

== Organisation ==
The Huai army in 1862 was organised in a standardised manner, the principal unit was the Ying comparable to a battalion consisting of 504 men divided into 4 shao (company) of equal size with a front, rear, left and right company. The Shao were further subdivided into 8 platoons each possessing 12-14 men grouped according to the weapons used as well as a cook and sergeant.

Huai Army Ying organisation
Companies	Command staff	1st and 5th Platoon (rifle)	2nd 4th 6th and 8th platoon (sword and spear)	3rd and 7th platoon (small arms)	Labourers	Total
4 Regular companies	Company commander Assistant commander 5 guards cook	1 sergeant 1 cook 12 soldiers	1 sergeant 1 cook 10 soldiers	1 sergeant 1 cook 10 soldiers		108
Guard Company	Battalion commander	1st and 3rd platoon cannon	2nd 4th and 6th platoon (sword and spear)	5th platoon (small arms)		
1 company		1 sergeant 1 cook 10 guards	1 sergeant 1 cook 10 guards	1 sergeant 1 cook 10 guards		72
1 Labour company					180	180

Above the Ying level organisation was not standardised with the detachment commander being able to command only a few ying and up to 70 ying at one time. However, even the figures on the table above only list the authorised standardised unit, those on special assignment or not yet formalised are not included within the army structure and due to corruption and combat as well as general attrition it is highly likely that most Ying were understrength to varying degrees.

Huai army organisation 1865
Unit type	Number of Battalions	Strength
Guard	7 battalions	4,795
Infantry	84 battalions	57,450
cannon	6 battalions	4,110
water	7 battalions	4,795
Associated armies	8 battalions	4,000
Total	104 battalions	75,240

=== Nian Campaign ===
Facing the more mobile mounted force of the Nian rebels the Huai army began to introduce cavalry to its organisation with each cavalry ying containing 250 mounted soldiers, 225 foot soldiers 25 sergeants and 11 officers for 511 men with 81 labourers for a total of 592 men with the armed contingent divided into 5 companies. Additionally, more Huai army troops were modernised by the adoption of firearms and the army was increased in size overall.

By 1865 over 4,000 troops were using foreign rifles and in 1866-67 an additional 31 infantry and 16 cavalry battalions were raised in 1867 7 of the new infantry battalions were converted into cavalry battalions and by 1868 at the conclusion of the campaign there were 17,400 men in cavalry battalions with a mounted contingent of 7,000 the addition of these new battalions including their auxiliaries would have meant the Huai expanded to over 100,000 troops.

== Officers ==
=== Main leaders ===
- Li Hongzhang
- Liu Bingzhang
- Cheng Xuechi
- Liu Mingchuan
- Guo Songlin
- Yuan Jiasan (袁甲三)

=== Secondary leaders ===
- Yuan Shikai
- Zhang Shusheng
- Zhang Shushang
- Pan Dingxin

== See also ==
- Beiyang Fleet
- Xiang Army
- New Army
- Gan Army
