= The Taiping Heavenly Kingdom (TV series) =

2000 Chinese television series

- DVD cover art
- 太平天国
- Genre: Historical drama
- Written by: Zhang Xiaotian
- Directed by: Chen Jialin
- Starring: Gao Lancun; Zhang Zhizhong; Liu Bing; Wang Shihuai; Huang He; Yang Tongshu; Wang Jinghua; Zhou Xun; Sun Feihu
- Theme music composer: Meng Qingyun; Qi Jianbo
- Opening theme: "Vast Heaven and Earth" (浩浩乾坤) by Han Lei
- Ending theme: "Song of Peace" (太平歌) by Lin Ping
- Country of origin: China
- Original language: Mandarin
- No. of episodes: 48

Production
- Producer: Jin Yusheng
- Production location: China
- Running time: ≈45 minutes per episode
- Production company: CCTV

Original release
- Network: CCTV
- Release: 10 July – 28 August 2000

The Taiping Heavenly Kingdom (太平天国) is a Chinese historical television series based on the events of the Taiping Rebellion in 19th-century China during the Qing dynasty. The 48-episode series was first broadcast on CCTV in mainland China in 2000, and subsequently on STAR Chinese Channel in Taiwan and on ATV in Hong Kong.

== Synopsis ==
In the mid-19th century, China is in decline due to corruption. Hong Xiuquan and others form the God Worshipping Society in Guangxi and secretly rally their followers to start a revolt against the ruling Qing dynasty.

In 1851, the Jintian Uprising breaks out in Guiping, Guangxi, marking the start of the Taiping Rebellion. The rebellion spreads like wildfire and many territories in southern China are taken by the rebels, with the Qing forces unable to stop their advance.

In 1853, the Taiping rebels capture Nanjing, renaming it Tianjing, and making the city the capital of their Taiping Heavenly Kingdom. Afterwards, they split their forces to conquer lands in the north and west.

Just as the Taiping Rebellion reaches its peak, tensions among the rebel leaders culminate in the Tianjing Incident of 1856. Since then, the rebellion starts going downhill. Meanwhile, the Qing government, with support from the local Xiang and Huai armies and foreign powers, eventually suppresses the rebellion by 1864.

== Cast ==
- Gao Lancun as Hong Xiuquan
- Zhang Zhizhong as Yang Xiuqing
- He Yongsheng as Feng Yunshan
- Han Zaifeng as Xiao Chaogui
- Liu Bing as Wei Changhui
- Wang Shihuai as Shi Dakai
- Lu Yong as Lin Fengxiang
- Yu De'an as Luo Dagang
- Lin Qiang as Qin Rigang
- Shi Xiaohong as Li Xiucheng
- Huang He as Chen Yucheng
- Yang Tongshu as Fu Shanxiang
- Wang Jinghua as Hong Xuanjiao
- Li Jianqun as Su Sanniang
- Hu Tiange as Cheng Lingnan
- Jin Yuting as Zeng Wanmei
- Zhou Xun as Shi Yiyang
- Li Ming as Yang Fuqing
- Wang Gang as Li Kaifang
- Lan Lan as Yimei
- Peng Jun as Zeng Shuiyuan
- Chen Baojia as Meng De'en
- Han Zhenhua as Chen Chengrong
- Zhou Yilun as Zhou Xineng
- Song Rixin as Hong Daquan
- Hu Zhaofeng as Wei Jun
- Yang Jing as Wei Yujuan
- Zhang Jie as Li Shouchun
- Lu Wei as Zeng Xian
- Zhao Jingwen as Hu Yihuang
- Cai Di as Hou Qianfang
- Yang Zhijiang as Hong Renfa
- Hao Tienan as Hong Renda
- Li Yansong as Hou Shuqian
- Guo Tao as Wang Yizhong
- Xu Honghao as Tan Shaoguang
- Pan Jie as Xie Manmei
- Shi Zonghong as Chen Zongyang
- Su Keshi as Zhu Yidian
- Liu Haili as Lai Hanying
- Hu Xiaoting as Hu Yurong
- Li Quanzhong as Wang Haixiang
- Sun Deli as Jiang Yuanba
- Liang Jiaxing as Shi Xiangzhen
- Du Jun as Siqin
- Yang Jimin as Huang Yukun
- Sun Feihu as Zeng Guofan
- Liu Yubin as Zuo Zongtang
- Hou Tianlai as the Xianfeng Emperor
- Gai Lili as Empress Dowager Cixi
- Xue Zhongrui as Sushun
- Zhao Yi as Prince Gong
- Zhu Yidan as Saishang'e
- Bao Si as Xiang Rong
- Zhang Guangzheng as Yang Fuzai
- Xu Maomao as Sengge Rinchen
- Cui Dai as Zeng Guoquan
- Hou Yongsheng as Zeng Tianyang
- Zhang Xiaobo as Wulantai
- Li Zheshi as Guo Kunchou
- Liu Gang as Guo Songchou
- Ye Qinglin as Zhang Liangji
- Wu Honghou as Luo Bingzhang

== Production ==
115 million yuan of the total budget of 150 million yuan was used for constructing the set, which is located in Nanhai District, Foshan, Guangdong.

== See also ==
- Twilight of a Nation
