= Twilight of a Nation =

1988 Hong Kong TV series

- DVD cover art
- Also known as: Taiping Heavenly Kingdom
- 太平天國
- Genre: Historical drama
- Starring: Ray Lui; Felix Wong
- Opening theme: "Never Regret" (永不遺憾) by Roman Tam
- Composer: Joseph Koo
- Country of origin: Hong Kong
- Original language: Cantonese
- No. of episodes: 45

Production
- Producer: Siu Sang
- Production location: Hong Kong
- Running time: ≈45 minutes per episode
- Production company: TVB

Original release
- Network: TVB Jade
- Release: 28 November 1988

Twilight of a Nation (太平天國) is a Hong Kong television series based on the events of the Taiping Rebellion and the rise and fall of the Taiping Heavenly Kingdom in 19th-century China. The 45-episode series was produced by Siu Sang and was first aired on TVB Jade in Hong Kong in November 1988. It was broadcast again on TVB in 1996. The songs in the series were sung by Roman Tam.

== Synopsis ==
The story begins in the late Qing dynasty when the government is plagued by corruption and foreign powers threaten to carve up China. Hong Xiuquan, born in an extremely poor Hakka family, participates in the imperial examination, hoping to pass and become a government official in order to provide for his family. He fails in each attempt and suffers from a nervous breakdown. Hong joins the Heaven and Earth Society later. One day, he has a revelation dream to spread Christianity and claims that he is the brother of Jesus Christ, and has been empowered by God to destroy the "demons" (the Qing forces). After rallying a group of supporters, Hong founds the God Worshipping Society to spread his religious ideas. He has another dream again, in which he is bestowed with a "Demon-Slaying Sword". After that, he leads his followers to start the a rebellion against the Qing government and establish the Taiping Heavenly Kingdom.

== Cast ==
- Ray Lui as Hong Xiuquan
- Felix Wong as Yang Xiuqing
- Li Kwok-lun as Feng Yunshan
- Sean Lau as Xiao Chaogui
- Chan Wing-chun as Wei Changhui
- Newton Lai as Shi Dakai
- Aaron Kwok as Qin Rigang
- Jimmy Au as Li Xiucheng
- Lee Yiu-king as Chen Yucheng
- Leung Kit-wah as Su Feng
- Sheren Tang as Han Baoying
- Teresa Mo as Ye Ling
- Money Chan as Hong Xuanjiao
- Kiki Sheung as Du Huizhen
- Yung Wai-ma as Lai Shujuan
- Carrie Choi as Fu Shanxiang
- Michael Tao as Li Zhaoshou
- Bak Man-biu as Meng De'en
- Chu Tit-wo as Luo Dagang
- Stella Wong as Yan Furong
- Leung Hung-wah as Hong Renfa
- Chun Hung as Hong Renzhong
- Ma Chung-tak as Lai Zhong
- Ho Kwai-lam as Miao Peilin
- Lau Kong as Zeng Guofan
- Wong Wan-choi as Li Hongzhang
- Bobby Au-yeung as Zeng Guoquan
- Alan Au as Zuo Zongtang
- Cheung Ying-choi as the Daoguang Emperor
- Nixon Pang as the Xianfeng Emperor
- Mary Hon as Consort Yi
- Pau Fong as Lin Zexu
- Kong Ngai as Qiying
- Stephan Yip as Zhao Chongnian
- Wilson Tsui as Jiang Zhongyuan
- Chan Tik-hak as Xiang Rong
- Mak Chi-wan as Zhang Zhao
- Fung Kwok as Tian Fang
- Au Ngok as Qishan
- Mak Ho-wai as Yishan
- Kwan Hoi-san as Squire Shi
- Derek Kwok
- Wayne Lai

== Production ==
The series was filmed in the CCTV Nanhai Studio in Foshan, Guangdong.

== See also ==
- The Taiping Heavenly Kingdom (TV series)
