= Taiping Tianguo =

Taiping Tianguo or Tai Ping Tian Guo (simplified Chinese: 太平天国; traditional Chinese: 太平天國; pinyin: Tài Píng Tiān Guó) may refer to:

- Taiping Rebellion, a civil war in China during the Qing dynasty from 1850 to 1864.
- Taiping Heavenly Kingdom, an oppositional state established in China by Hong Xiuquan, leader of the Taiping Rebellion.
- Twilight of a Nation, a 1988 Hong Kong TV series.
- The Taiping Heavenly Kingdom, a 2000 Chinese TV series.
- Buddha Bless America, a 1996 Taiwanese film by Wu Nien-jen.
