= Wei Jun =

- Born: 1827; Jintian, Guiping, Guangxi
- Died: 1884 (aged 56–57); Wuhu, Anhui
- Relatives: Wei Changhui (uncle)
- Military career
- Allegiance: Taiping Heavenly Kingdom (1851–1856); Great Qing (1856–1884)
- Rank: Colonel General
- Conflicts: Taiping Rebellion: Western Expedition; Tianjing Incident
- Awards: Ding Tian Fu (定天福)

Wei Jun (c. 1827–1884) (simplified Chinese: 韦俊; traditional Chinese: 韋俊; pinyin: Wéi Jùn) born in Guangxi, Wei Changhui's brother's son, was a Chinese Colonel General during the Taiping Rebellion and later served as the general of the Taiping monarchy in the early and middle stages of the rebellion. He attacked the Wuchang three times, and occupied the district successfully in 1855. In the third battle of Wuchang, the 100,000 Taiping troops he commanded shot the Xiang Army's spirit master Luo Zenan, which disrupted Zeng Guofan and the Xiang Army.

Wei Jun's subordinate was Chen Yucheng in the beginning.

Tianjing's struggle Incident happened on September 2, 1856, and Chen Yucheng did not obey Wei's orders, but retreated from Wuchang in the autumn of 1859. He surrendered to Qing shortly thereafter at Chizhou. Qing accepted Wei's surrender and incorporated Wei's troops into his own. Some of these generals, such as Cheng Xueqi and Ding Ruchang, were surrendered by Wei in the battle of Anqing, 1861. The Qing government bore a grudge; three governors of Hubei were KIA or forced to suicide and Wei was forced to retire as just a colonel and lived in Wuhu.

Wei provided important information about Li Xiucheng and Chen Yucheng to Zeng Guoquan.

Wei Jun's surrender was a catastrophic loss of military strategy for the Taiping Rebellion, worse than the Battle of the Scheldt and Battle of Wuhan (1938).

== Sources ==
- Jonathan D. Spence - God's Chinese Son. - Norton Books.
- Draft History of Qing

Military offices
Preceded by Colonel General Qin Rigang	Taiping's commander of Western Army Group; Colonel General; 1855–1858	Succeeded by Field Marshal Chen Yucheng
