= Tang Zhengcai =

Chinese naval commander (1816–1863)

King of Hang Tang Zhengcai
- Born: 1816; Qiyang County, Hunan, Qing China
- Died: 1863 (aged 46–47); Wuxi, Jiangsu, Qing China
- Military career
- Allegiance: Taiping Heavenly Kingdom
- Branch: Navy
- Conflicts: Taiping Rebellion: Battle of Wuchang; Battle of Shanghai (1861)

Tang Zhengcai (Chinese: 唐正才, 1816–1863, born in Qiyang County, Hunan) was a navy leader of the Taiping Rebellion, known during his tenure as the King of Hang (航王). He led the Taiping fleet in many battles, nearly destroying the Xiang Army. He trained other naval officers, including Li Rongfa and Li Xiucheng. Tang was killed in action in 1863.

Tang Zhengcai employed wooden bridges similar in design to the Bailey bridge later developed by Donald Bailey.

== Battles ==
In the a battle near Nanjing on March 10, 1853, Tang commanded the first offensive, successfully cutting off every river pass that could reinforce Nanjing. In 1854, at Lake Dongting, Tang's fleet surrounded the Xiang Army's fleet and destroyed much of it. Tang's fleet later transported 30,000 of Shi Dakai's troops along the Yangtze in a swift surprise attack.

In 1857, Tang's fleet moved to Wuhu, between Wuhan and Nanjing; it remained there to defend the location until 1861, when a Xiang counterattack forced Tang to retreat to Nanjing.

In 1863, he was killed in action – shot by the Huai Army in Wuxi.
