= Tiande =

Tiande (天德) may refer to:

- Tiande, Liaoning, town in Xifeng County, Liaoning, China

== Historical eras ==
- Tiande (943–945), era name used by Wang Yanzheng, emperor of Min
- Tiande (1149–1153), era name used by Wanyan Liang, emperor of Jin

== People ==
- Hong Daquan (19th century), titled Tian De, early leader of the Taiping Rebellion whose historicity is debated
