= Yang Fuqing (general) =

Yang Fuqing (Chinese: 楊輔清; died 1874), born in Mei County (now Meixian District), Guangdong, was a rebel leader during the middle and late Taiping Rebellion against the Qing government in 1855–1874. He was given the title tou wang (头王).

In 1858, Yang Fuqing defeated Wei Jun, who surrendered to the Qing government, and occupied the Chizhou for Taiping. He is sometimes mentioned as participating in the Northern Expedition, but other sources contradict this. In 1864, the Taiping Rebellion ended with defeat to the Nanjing, and Yang fled to America from Shanghai by ship. Yang Fuqing created a Chinese gang in Los Angeles, California in 1866. He was a young brother-in-law to Yang Xiuqing.

Yang was arrested during the siege of Fuzhou which movement was in 1874. He joined the Green Standard Army and organized an anti-Qing espionage unit. This was discovered by colonel Wei Jun and Brigadier General Ma Ronghe. He was killed in Fuzhou. Some sources claim that this was not actually Yang's fate, but that of another, unnamed Taiping general.
