= Hong Xuanjiao =

Female general during the Taiping Rebellion (c. 1830 - 1856 or later)

- 洪宣嬌
- Born: c. 1830; Luoludong, Wuxuan County, Guangxi Province, Qing China
- Other names: Yang Yunjiao (楊雲嬌); Hong Xianjiao (洪先嬌)
- Military career
- Allegiance: Taiping Heavenly Kingdom
- Conflicts: Taiping Rebellion

Hong Xuanjiao (Chinese: 洪宣嬌, born c. 1830 - fl. 1856), also known as Yang Yunjiao (Chinese: 楊雲嬌) and Yang Xuanjiao (Chinese: 楊宣嬌), was a Chinese general and rebel leader during the Taiping Rebellion. She was said to be the younger sister of the leader of Taiping Heavenly Kingdom, Hong Xiuquan, and the wife of Xiao Chaogui, the West King. She led women into the battlefield against the Qing dynasty for the Taiping cause.

== Life ==
Hong Xuanjiao is believed to have been born around 1830 to a man named Huang Quanzheng (黃權政) in Luoludong (羅淥峒), Wuxuan county, Guangxi province. She was later adopted as a sister of Yang Xiuqing, the East King, who claimed the Heavenly Father willed that Xuanjiao should bear the surname Yang as she is his sixth daughter. Some time after her wedding to Xiao Chaogui, on 30 January 1850, Xiao claimed that Jesus Christ specified him as a brother-in-law equivalent to Hong Xiuquan, Feng Yunshan, and Yang Xiuqing. It is in this manner that Xuanjiao became a sister of Hong Xiuquan and became known as Hong Xuanjiao. In some sources, Xiao Chaogui's wife is named Yang Yunjiao; it is most likely that Yang Yunjiao and Hong Xuanjiao were the same person, and that Yang Yunjiao changed her name to Xuanjiao to avoid a naming taboo with the South King Feng Yunshan.

As a commander of the female soldiers in service of the Taiping army, she led hundreds of female soldiers and was herself trained in martial arts. She was described as being extraordinarily valiant and extraordinarily beautiful, and also was responsible for the women who took part in the battle under the banner of the Taiping rebels. She distinguished herself in battle and achieved significant feats.

She last appeared in the historical record in 1856 in the lead-up to the Tianjing incident, where she, alarmed by the arrogance of her adoptive brother Yang Xiuqing, pleaded Hong Xiuquan to eliminate Xiao as a potential threat, but Hong Xiuquan, mindful of their former camaraderie, refused her pleas. The Taiping Rebellion ended in failure when Nanjing was captured by Qing forces in 1864. Hong Xuanjiao's fate remains unknown.
