= CCTV Nanhai Studio =

Film studio in Foshan, China

- Traditional Chinese: 中國中央電視臺南海影視城
- Simplified Chinese: 中国中央电视台南海影视城
Transcriptions
Standard Mandarin
- Hanyu Pinyin: Zhōngguó Zhōngyāng Diànshìtái Nánhaǐ Yǐngshìchéng
Yue: Cantonese
- Yale Romanization: Jūnggwok Jūngyēung Dihnsihtòih Nàahmhói Yíngsihséng

The CCTV Nanhai Studio (Chinese: 中国中央电视台南海影视城) is a famous set of film studio in Nanhai District of Foshan, Guangdong, China.

== History ==
Construction begun in July 1996 and completed in August 1998. In August 2016, it was officially approved by the National Tourism Administration for the state 5A-class tourist scenic spot.

== Notable films and TV series ==
Films and TV series that have used the services of the studio include:

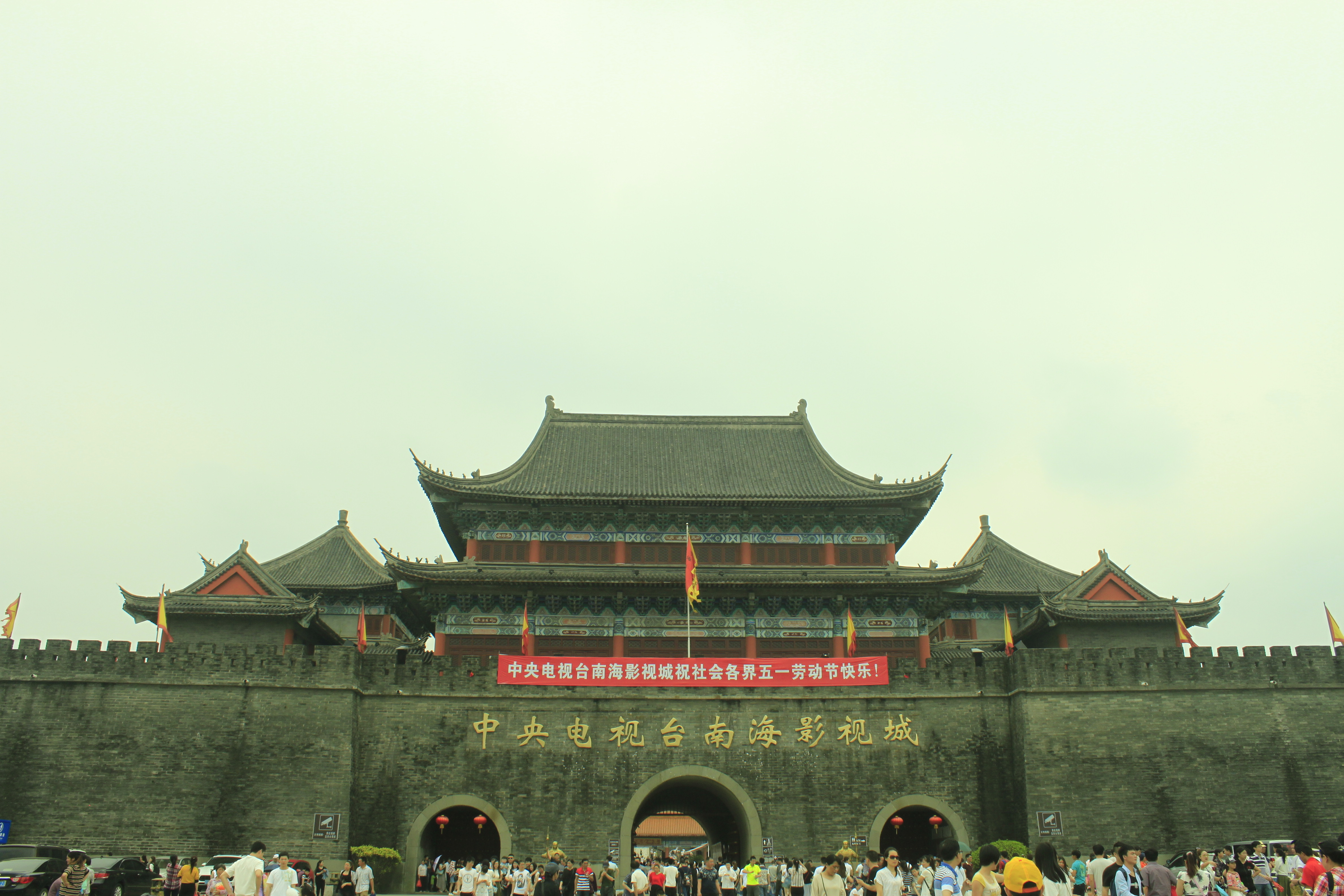
The entrance of CCTV Nanhai Studio, in Foshan, Guangdong, China.

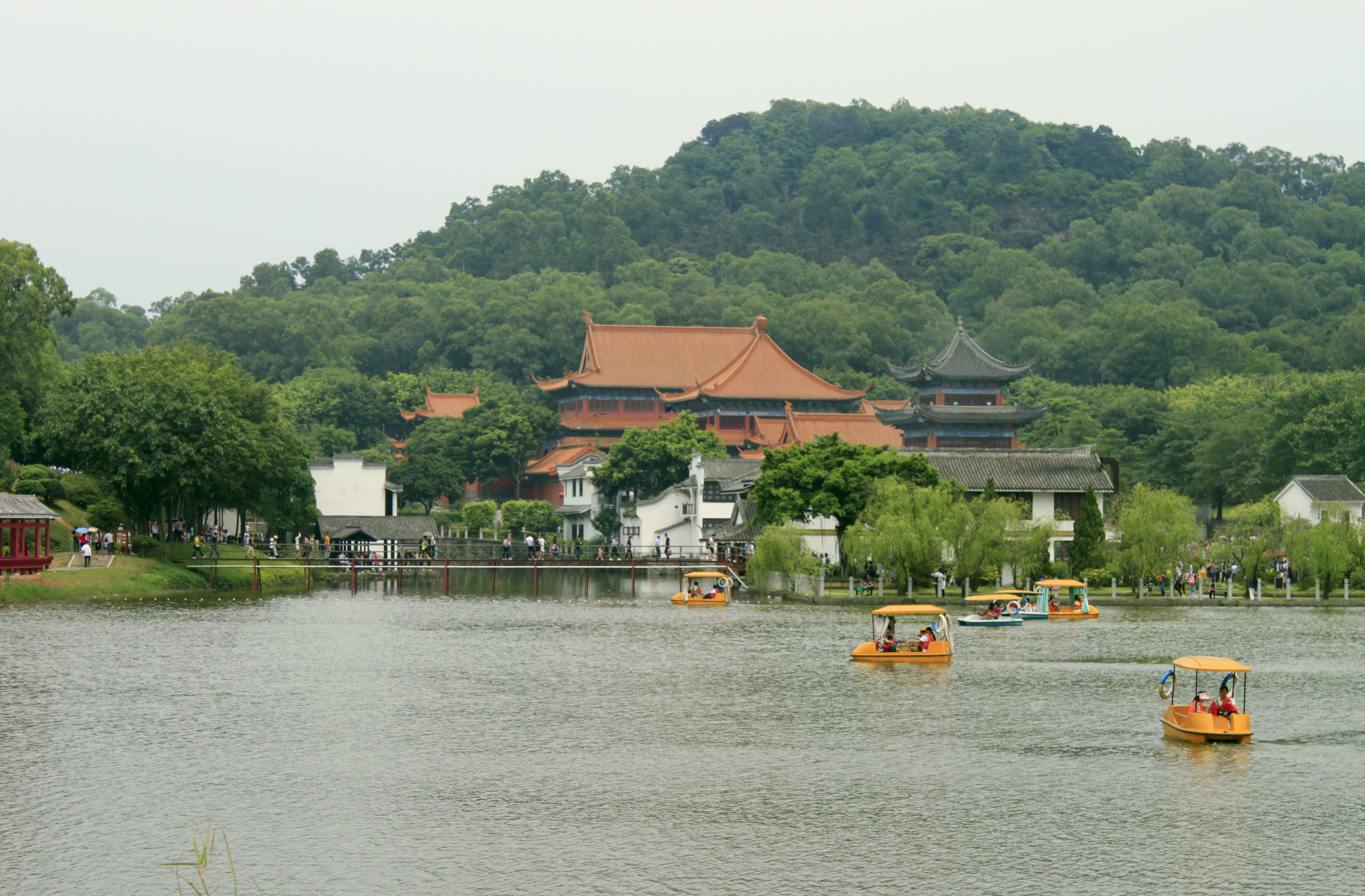
Lake and Water Town and Palace in CCTV Nanhai Studio.

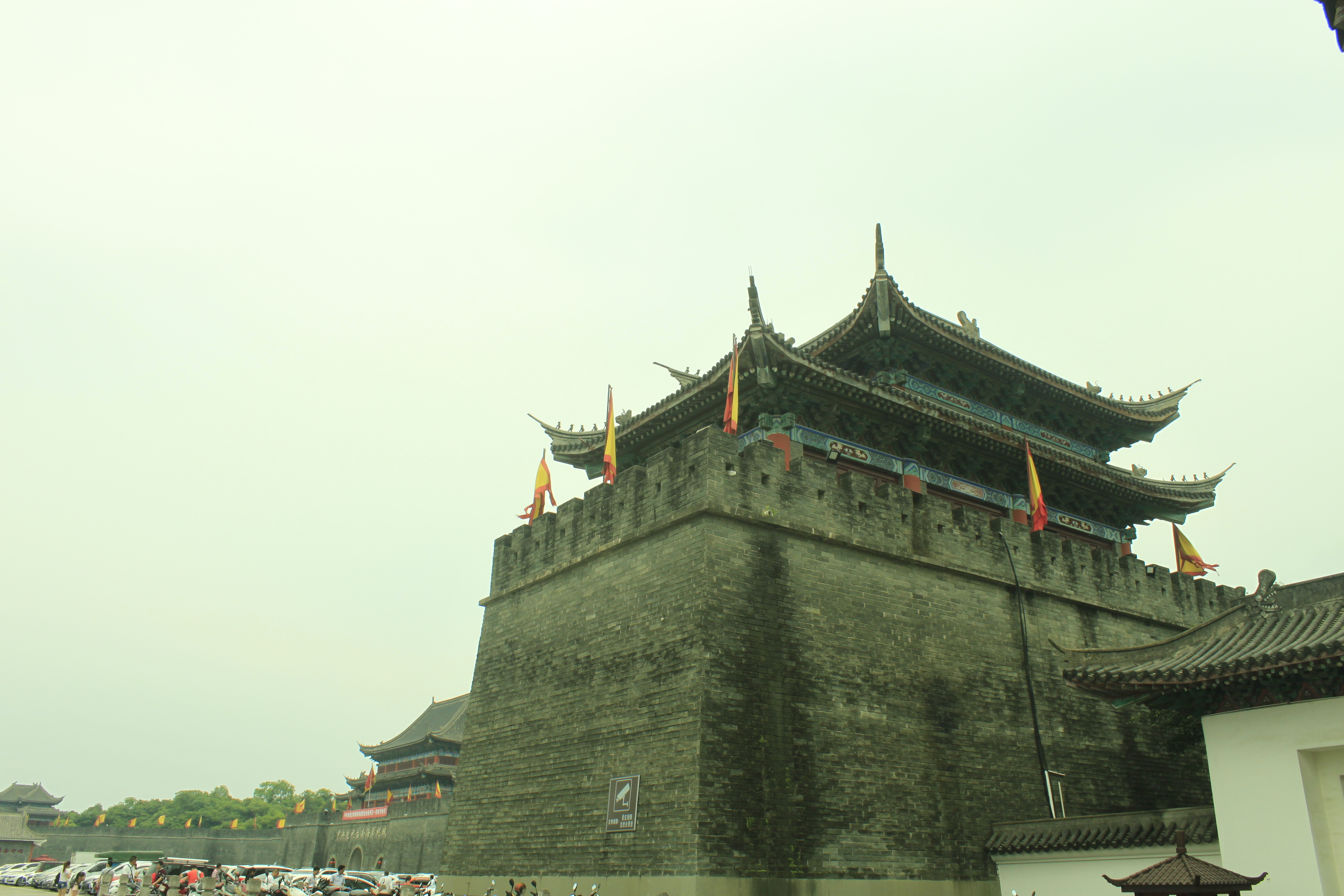
The wall of CCTV Nanhai Studio.

Title	Chinese Title	Notes
The Story of Hong Kong	《香港的故事》	
Bonds of Blood	《千秋家国梦》	
Tracking of Today	《今日追踪》	
Oriental Fairy Godmother	《东方教母》	
General A Fu	《将军阿福》	
Happy Monk	《开心出家人》	
Overrun the Four Seas	《纵横四海》	
Twilight of a Nation	《太平天囯》	
The Story of Macau	《澳门的故事》	
Tianxia Youqing	《天下有情》	
Births and Deaths Marriages	《生死姻缘》	
Past Life	《前世今生》	
Home	《家园》	
Magic Mirror	《魔镜》	
The Mad Phoenix	《南海十三郎》	
Sword Stained with Royal Blood	《碧血剑》	
Heroes Of The Times	《新方世玉》	
The Legend of Master Sou	《醉拳苏乞儿》	
Young Justice Bao	《少年包青天》	
Canghai Qingchou	《沧海情仇》	
Showbiz Ticoon	《影城大亨》	
Sun Yat-sen	《孙中山》	
Rare Treasures	《稀世宝帖》	
Heroes of the East	《中华丈夫》	
The Sun Rises in the East	《日出东方》	
Ridiculous Detective	《荒谬神探》	
Su Dongpo	《苏东坡》	
Founding Hero: Zheng Chenggong	《开台英雄郑成功》	
The Casino Hero	《赌海枭雄》	
Romance of Guangxi Army	《桂系演义》	
Woman Bathing	《女人汤》	
Chivalrous Lady: Ding Dingdang	《侠女丁叮铛》	
Silent Vow	《誓言无声》	
The King Of Adventure	《冒险王》	
I come to the Future	《朕到未来》	
The Story of Su Nu	《素女的故事》	
Red Tie	《红领巾》	
Mare of Qao	《豪门惊梦》	
A Chinese Ghost Story	《倩女幽魂》	
Ruan Aiguo in China	《阮爱国在中国》	
Sui and Tang dynasties	《隋唐传》	
Child Prodigy	《神童》	
Cape Fear	《海角惊魂》	
Kimi Wo wasurenai	《爱与梦飞翔》	
Love In A Miracle	《爱在有情天》	
Cheng Long Guai Xu	《乘龙怪婿》	
Where Is Mama's Boy	《花街欢乐坊》	
The Greatest Hero	《无敌英雄》	
Wind and Rain in Xiguan	《风雨西关》	
The Herbalist's Manual	《本草药王》	
Myth of Ah You	《阿有正传》	
