= Hong Daquan =

Purported Chinese triad leader

- Chinese: 洪大全
- Hanyu Pinyin: Hóng Dàquán
Transcriptions
Standard Mandarin
- Hanyu Pinyin: Hóng Dàquán
- Wade–Giles: Hung Ta-ch'üan

Tian De
- Chinese: 天德王
- Hanyu Pinyin: Tiāndé Wáng
Transcriptions
Standard Mandarin
- Hanyu Pinyin: Tiāndé Wáng
- Wade–Giles: T'ien-te Wang

Hong Daquan (Chinese: 洪大全) or Tian De (天德; 'Heavenly Virtue') was a possibly mythical leader of the early Taiping Rebellion connected to the triads. His identity and even his existence have been a matter of dispute, and the title "Tian De" may refer to multiple people. Modern research suggests that Hong was a triad leader from Hunan Province named Jiao Liang who collaborated with the Taiping rebels but held the title "Tian De" independently of the movement.

== Original reports ==
In the first few years of the 1850s, at the opening of the Taiping Rebellion, European observers in China noted reports of a "shadowy figure" named Emperor Tian De, who was originally confused with Hong Xiuquan. It was rumoured that the rebels had crowned a descendant of the Ming dynasty. Tian De was especially associated with proclamations issued by triad circles, but these manifestos ceased appearing by the time of the fall of Nanjing to the Taiping rebels in 1853. The rebels were then said to have denied his existence.

=== Published confession ===
In 1852, the Qing government published a confession by a man claiming to be Hong Daquan, saying that he had been conferred the title of "Tiande Wang" (天德王; 'King of Heavenly Virtue') by Hong Xiuquan, who had made him co-sovereign of the Taiping Heavenly Kingdom, and that he had been captured in battle in April that year.

The authenticity of the document is a "mystery". As early as 1853, the missionaries Joseph-Marie Callery and Melchior Yvan discounted it as a "political comedy" and a "perfidious attempt to compromise the Christians". Theodore Hamberg believed that the name "Tian De" was simply a misinterpretation of the name of the Taiping Kingdom and referred to Xiuquan himself.

== Later historiography ==
Among later Western historians, William Hail and Têng Ssu-yü argued in favour of Hong Daquan's existence and leading role in the rebellion. Hail accepted the authenticity of the confession. According to his 1927 analysis, Daquan was a more competent leader than Xiuquan, well-connected and perhaps a Ming descendant who could rely on the loyalty of the triads, and characterised by a strategic and political rather than a religious sensibility. With his capture, Hail suggested, the Taiping movement came under the uncontested control of the religious faction led by Xiuquan, who was subsequently deserted by the triads, dealing a critical blow to the rebellion's power. In 1950, Têng stated in his New Light on the History of the Taiping Rebellion that Daquan was considered emperor by the triads, and was a more popular leader than Xiuquan in the period immediately after 1849.

Summarising the consensus of Chinese research up to 1982, Elizabeth J. Perry states that Hong Daquan was a real triad leader from Xinning County, Hunan, originally named Jiao Liang (焦亮). Rather than bearing a title conferred on him by the Taiping Kingdom, he was named "Hong" and "Tian De" by the triads themselves in line with their own longstanding religious tradition. The early Taiping movement used this regnal title in deference to the triads' practice. However, Perry adds that there may have been multiple triad leaders titled Tian De who cooperated with the Taiping revolt: for example, another rebel captured in 1852 claimed that Tian De, whom he had personally encountered, was a 17–18-year-old youth surnamed Zhu (朱, the surname of the Ming emperors).
