= Shi Dakai =

General and honorary king of the Taiping Heavenly Kingdom

Shi Dakai 石達開
- Wing King (翼王)

Wing King of the Heavenly Kingdom
- Reign: 17 December 1851 – 27 June 1863
- Heavenly King: Hong Xiuquan
- Born: March 1, 1831; Gui County, Guangxi, Qing Empire
- Died: June 26, 1863 (aged 32); Chengdu, Sichuan, Qing Empire
- Spouse: Lady Xiong; Lady Huang
- Issue: Hu Yonghuo (son); Shi Dingji (son); Shi Dingzhong (son)
Regnal name
- 殿前吏部又正天僚開朝公忠又副軍師頂天扶朝綱翼王喜千歲
- Military career
- Allegiance: Taiping Heavenly Kingdom
- Service years: 1851–1863
- Rank: Commander
- Nickname: Shigandang
- Commands: Taiping army
- Conflicts: Taiping Rebellion: Battle of Nanjing (1853); Tianjing incident

Chinese name
- Traditional Chinese: 石達開
- Simplified Chinese: 石达开
Transcriptions
Standard Mandarin
- Hanyu Pinyin: Shí Dákāi
- Wade–Giles: Shih^{2} Ta^{2}-k'ai^{1}
Wu
- Wugniu: Zaq^{8} Daq^{8}-khe^{1}
Hakka
- Pha̍k-fa-sṳ: Sa̍k Tha̍t-khôi

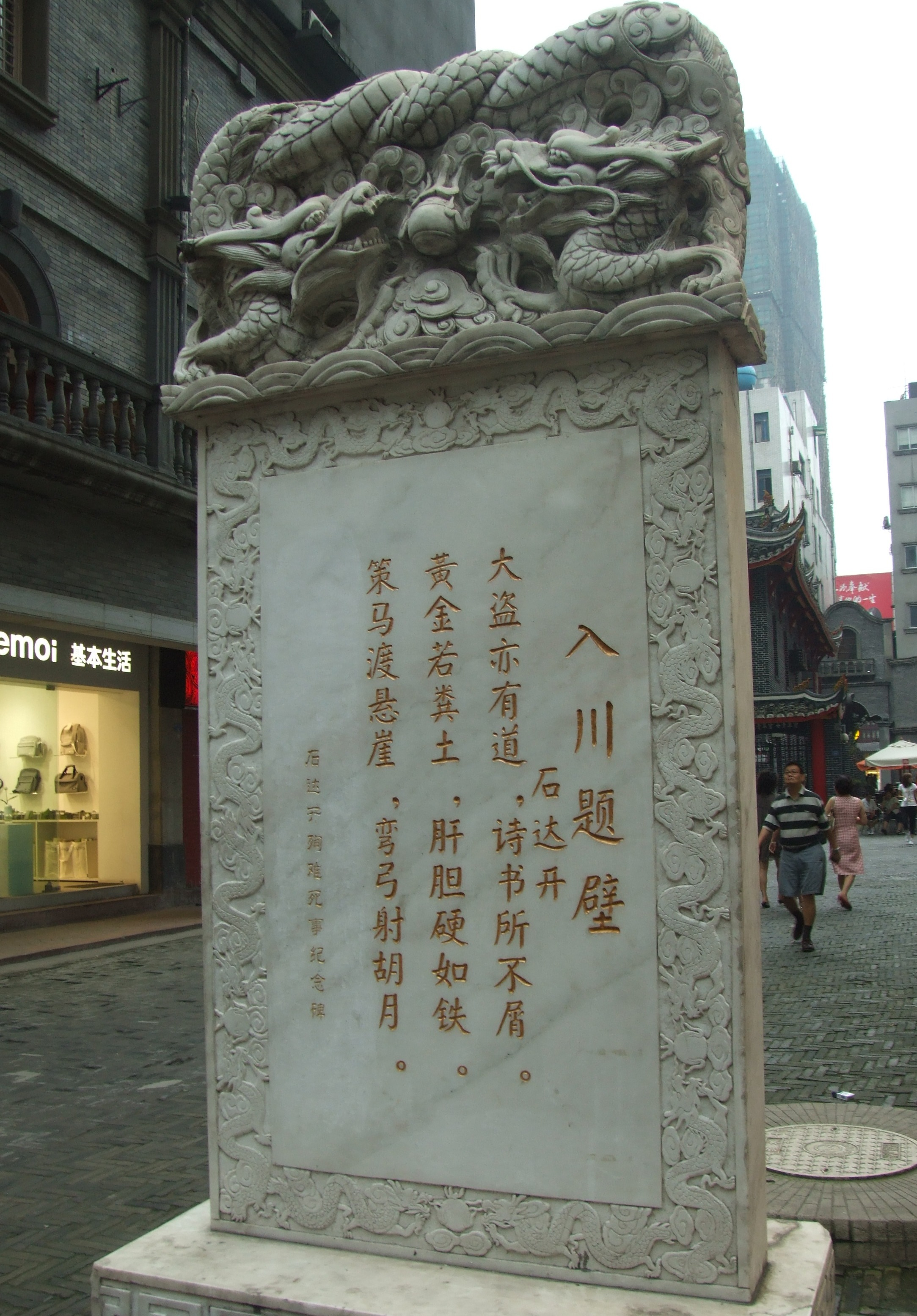
A monument of Shi Dakai in Chengdu, where Shi Dakai was killed by the Qing government

Shi Dakai (1 March 1831 – 25 June 1863; simplified Chinese: 石达开; traditional Chinese: 石達開; pinyin: Shí Dákāi), born in Guigang, Guangxi, also known as the Wing King (Chinese: 翼王五千歲; lit. 'Lord of Five Thousand Years') or phonetically translated as Yi-Wang, was one of the most highly acclaimed leaders in the Taiping Rebellion and a poet.

== Early life ==
Shi Dakai was a Hakka from Gui County, Guangxi. He headed the family at a young age after being orphaned, and was known in the local community for his hospitality, martial skills and justice in handling local affairs. Shi had studied for the imperial examinations, but had failed in his attempts to pass them.

== Taiping Rebellion ==
In 1849, at the age of 16, Shi was sought out by Feng Yunshan and Hong Xiuquan, and joined them in the leadership of the rebellion. Quickly distinguished by his brilliant tactics, skilled training of the troops and fair administration of the public funds, Shi was made commander of his own army at the age of nineteen.

In January 1851, Hong Xiuquan and the five key leaders of the rebellion (among whom Shi was the youngest) formally established the Kingdom of Heavenly Peace in Jintian, Guangxi, with about twenty thousand followers. In May, the Taiping army moved into Guangxi, followed by the Qing army, who launched a fierce attack. At Renyi's watergate, Shi used stealth strategy to win a decisive victory with three hundred men against the enemies' five thousand. In August, after the Taiping conquered the city Yongan, Shi won wide admiration from the populace for his gentle rule and fair administration, people attracted by his reputation coming to join the rebellion in flocks. In October, Hong Xiuquan made the twenty-year-old Shi E-Wang, "Lord of the Holy Lighting". Shi later spearheaded the series of battles that won the city Nanjing for the Taiping, where they established their capital, to be known as Tianjing, or Heavenly Capital (天京). Now legendary and avowed among the Qing army, Shi was also the only Taiping commander who fought through those battles without a single defeat. Both friend and foe noted his kindness in treating civilians, and folk songs that commemorated his victories became popular in the lands the Taiping moved through.

While he did notable work fortifying the capital Tianjing, Shi's most famous political accomplishment was his reform of Anqing (安慶易制). In 1854, Shi arrived in Anqing and undertook military and civil affairs. He created compassionate decrees that encouraged agriculture, lightened taxes and stimulated commerce, and insinuated local talent to create an efficient and honest bureaucracy. He restored the badly neglected public security by encouraging civilians to report the misbehaviours of soldiers and handing out fair punishments. In a few months of Shi's administration Anqing became one of the most loyal and well-managed cities of Taiping, as well as one of the best fortified.

Shi's battle of Hukou, Jiangxi, in 1855, was the most dramatic of Taiping's military victories. The Xiang marines (湘軍水師), led by Zeng Guofan, was considered the elite of Qing forces. Shi arrived on the battlefield in December, receiving command after Taiping had already suffered serious losses. Shi planned the battle meticulously, laying out airtight defenses and using small boats to continuously harass the enemy camps, then trapping the Qing's ships with secretly built dams and chopping the Xiang forces in half. Shi led a series of swift offenses securing decisive victories for Taiping, driving the Qing commander Zeng Guofan to attempt suicide, and later calling Shi "the most cunning and strong amongst the Taiping."

Shi's personal life is the most austere of all Taiping leaders. His dwelling was the most modest and he was the only one who refused to tear down civilian homes in its construction. While the Taiping Kingdom's custom required leaders to have multiple wives, Shi was content with his wife Huang and repeatedly declined the beauties offered to him. He had two sons, Dingji and Dingzhong, with her. The only additional wives he took were those commanded upon him by his superiors. These women and the female officers had the freedom of riding in and out of his dwelling, a liberty unheard of in the house of other Kings. In his youth, Shi's original wife Xiong left him when he decided to join the rebellion, carrying their unborn son with her. The child was born into Xiong's second marriage and later claimed back by Shi's aunt and was renamed to Hu Yonghuo. He was Shi's only surviving issue.

In 1856, civil war broke out between the East King Yang Xiuqing and the North King Wei Changhui murdering tens of thousands, known as the Tianjing Incident. Hearing of the massacre, Shi returned to Tianjing attempting to mediate, but instead was forced to flee the city, and his entire family including his son Dingji were murdered by Wei Changhui. Shi escaped to Anqing and summoned forces against the half-insane Wei Changhui, but upon learning that Qing armies threatened Huannan, he decided to put the Kingdom first and moved the forces to help the defense. This move won him further acclaim. In November, Hong Xiuquan ordered Wei Changhui's execution and requested that Shi return to Tianjing and take over the administration, whereupon he obeyed. He restored order to the city and rebuilt Taiping's broken morale, and the public support for Shi caused Hong Xiuquan to harbor deeper suspicion against him. Hong then handed power to his two brothers and gradually undermined Shi's administration, to the point where Shi realized that he must either leave or risk the eruption of another civil war In 1857, Shi left the capital, writing a poem asking the people to have faith in the Taiping Kingdom, and the people who wish to follow him may do so. The exact number that chose to follow Shi, and the damage this caused the Taiping, is a matter of intense academic debate: Li Xiucheng, Shi's contemporary, claimed that Shi led away tens of thousands with devastating results, but there is little historical evidence to correspond with this while some testifying against it, as Shi had only a small force to mobilize inside Tianjing in the first place, and an enemy record shows that the expedition from Tianjing was small enough to cross the Tongjing river in less than a day.

While Shi left Tianjing, he was not separated from the Taiping command, for he still maintained communication with Hong Xiuquan and sent his forces to assist various Taiping commanders on other battle fronts. He did not completely give up hopes to return until Hong Xiuquan replaced his authority of command, upon which he began the expedition away from Tianjing. Over the course of the expedition, soldiers from various sources came to join Shi. He fought for six years throughout central China against the much larger armies of the Qing dynasty. To this day, many legends about him are still told affectionately in the provinces that his army travelled through. As they were further and further from Tianjing, some of Shi's officers tried to persuade him to shed the name of Taiping and establish his own rule, which he repeatedly refused. Eventually some of the troops split from him and headed back toward Tianjing.

During the course of the expedition, Shi's troops weaved in and out of the geographically harsh Sichuan province. In December 1862, Shi's army crossed the Jinsha River (River of the Golden Sand) under heavy fire from the Qing, using a diversion to mislead the enemy. They set up plans to cross over the banks of the Dadu in order to reach their destination Chengdu. One of Shi's officers led a branch of the army across the river without difficulty, but by the time Shi and his main army arrived, a furious flood suddenly made the river impossible to cross. Several attempts were made with heavy losses, and the army was running out of rations. The Qing army followed a few days behind. On 13 June, Shi Dakai negotiated with the Qing to spare his men's lives if he turned himself in. He entered Qing camps with three followers, dressed in formal Taiping uniform, and spoke to the Qing fearlessly. He was questioned and imprisoned, and on the 25th he was sentenced to be executed by slow slicing in the Anshun Court. His enemies recorded that through the entire torturous execution Shi did not flinch, and never once cried out in pain. He was 32 years old. After his death, 4,000 men among Shi's troops were released, and the remaining 2,000 were executed. His son Dingzhong was also executed. Many of Shi's former troops continued to battle the Qing, most notably the forces led by Lai Yuxin and Li Fuyou.

While Shi Dakai was an accomplished poet, only three of his authentic works survive, along with two more probables. After his death, many romantic poems of the heroism style were written in his name, borrowing his prestige to encourage more and more Chinese people to overthrow the Qing dynasty, something that eventually led to the creation of the Republic of China in 1912.

Shi's heroics as an outstanding general were later to inspire his fellow Hakka clansman Zhu De, who founded the Red Army, later known as the People's Liberation Army.

== Sources ==
- Hessler, Peter (25 April 2006). River Town: Two Years on the Yangtze. HarperCollins. pp. 54, 56. ISBN 0-06-085502-9.
- Shi, Shi 史式 (1985). 太平军在四川 [The Taiping in Sichuan]. Sichuan People's Publishing.
- Shi, Shi 史式 (1991). 太平天国史实考. 重庆出版社. ISBN 7-5366-1502-7.
- Luo, Ergang 罗尔纲 (1977) [1955]. Studies of Surviving Historical Documents on the Kingdom of Heavenly Peace (Second ed.). Sanlian (Three Alliances) Publishing.
- Hummel, Arthur W. Sr., ed. (1943). "Shih Ta-k'ai" . Eminent Chinese of the Ch'ing Period. United States Government Printing Office.
