= Wei Changhui =

Wei Changhui 韋昌輝
- North King (北王)
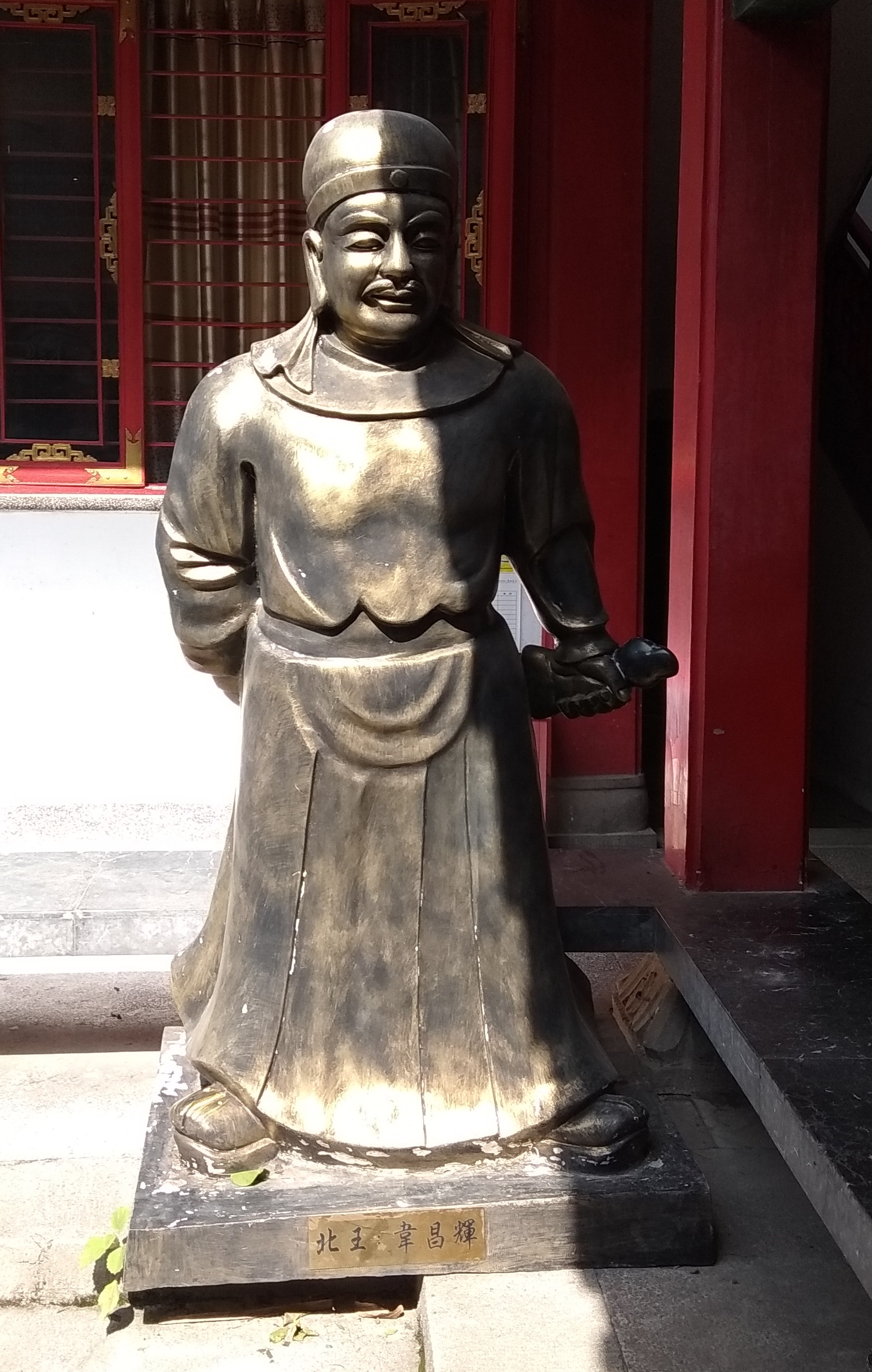

North King of the Heavenly Kingdom
- Reign: 1851 - 1856
- Heavenly King: Hong Xiuquan
- Born: Wei Zheng (韋正); 1823; Jintian, Guangxi, Qing China
- Died: 1856 (aged 32–33); Tianjing, Taiping Heavenly Kingdom (present-day Nanjing, Jiangsu)
Regnal name
- 真天命太平天囯後護又副軍師北王六千歲
- Father: Wei Yuanjie (韋元玠)
- Religion: God Worshipping Society
- Military career
- Allegiance: Taiping Heavenly Kingdom
- Conflicts: Taiping Rebellion: Jintian uprising; Battle of Nanjing (1853); Tianjing incident

Wei Changhui (simplified Chinese: 韦昌辉; traditional Chinese: 韋昌輝; pinyin: Wéi Chānghuī) was the North King of the Taiping Heavenly Kingdom during the Taiping Rebellion.

== Pre-Rebellion involvement ==
Wei Changhui was a wealthy native of Jintian, Guiping, Guangxi, who owned both land and a pawnshop. Wei was also educated and a member of a prosperous clan that had ensured that the market town of Jiantin was a safe haven for the God Worshippers. During the early days of the movement during the 1840s, Wei converted to God Worshipping by Feng Yunshan and Hong Xiuquan. During the summer of 1848, Wei swore brotherhood to Hong Xiuquan, Feng Yunshan, Yang Xiuqing, Xiao Chaogui, Shi Dakai.

== During the Rebellion ==
Wei was a principal Taiping general since the early days of the rebellion. On December 4, 1851, Hong Xiuquan declared Wei to be the North King, Lord of 6,000 Years. Once the Taiping captured Nanjing, Wei began to coordinate the defense of the surrounding region and managed Nanjing's food supplies.

== Tianjing Incident and death ==
In order to consolidate his power, Yang Xiuqing began to humiliate and threaten Wei. Shortly before seeking a title commensurate with Hong Xiuquan's, Yang dispatched Wei, Shi Dakai, and Qin Rigang to separate provinces. Hong, viewing Yang's request as treasonous, alerted the three generals to return at once. Wei returned to Nanjing with three thousand troops on September 1, 1856, and found that Qin Rigang had already arrived. In consultation with Hong Xiuquan and his allies, the two generals decided not to wait for Shi Dakai's arrival. Instead, they and their troops immediately stormed Yang's palace and slew him before he could escape. They then slaughtered his family and followers within the palace, despite having agreed with Hong that only Yang was to die. At this point, six thousand of Yang's followers remained in Nanjing. Hong and his generals agreed to set a trap for those men. Hong pretended to arrest Wei and Qin Rigang for their actions and invited Yang's followers to watch as the two were beaten. Once the majority of Yang's followers were inside, the beatings ceased and Yang's followers were imprisoned inside the halls from which they were watching the beatings. The next morning, they were all systemically slaughtered. Killings of Yang's followers continued for three additional months.

Shi Dakai finally reached Nanjing in October and blamed Wei for the excessive bloodshed. Wei in turn suggested that Shi may be a traitor. Having been warned that he could be assassinated next, Shi fled Nanjing, leaving the same day he arrived. That night, Wei and Qin Rigang stormed Shi's mansion and slaughtered his family and retinue. Shi then consolidated an army of 100,000 and demanded the heads of Wei and Qin. Wei directed Qin to block Shi's advance and began plotting to imprison Hong Xiquan. Hong Xiuquan was able to preempt those plans, however, and had his bodyguards kill Wei. Qin was lured back and killed shortly thereafter.
