= Battle of Nanjing (1853) =

1853 rebellion

- Part of the Taiping Rebellion
Date	March 1853
Location	Nanjing and surrounding areas
Result	Taiping victory
Territorial changes	Fall of Nanjing

Belligerents
(Qing dynasty) Qing Dynasty; Green Standard Army; Eight Banners	Taiping Heavenly Kingdom

Commanders and leaders
(Qing dynasty) Lu Jianying †; Imperial Commissioner Xiang Rong	Qin Rigang; Yang Xiuqing; Wei Changhui

Strength
40,000–60,000 men (included Eight Banners 20,000)	550,000 men

Casualties and losses
~30,000	10,000
- ~30,000 families of Manchu bannermen killed + 40,000 other Local Chinese merchants or civilian

The Battle of Nanjing (1853) (Chinese: 太平軍攻佔南京; pinyin: Taiping jun gongzhan Nánjīng) began after the fall of Wuhan on March 8, 1853, and ended with the fall of the capital city of Nanjing on March 19, 1853, to Taiping troops, a few days after the Qing government evacuated the city.

The remaining Qing garrison surrendered to the Taiping, but they were nonetheless executed.

== Background ==
Taiping forces captured Wuchang in January 1853, but instead of marching north and directly attacking Beijing they decided to head east and first take control of Nanjing with a force of 500,000+ men. The floating bridges initially used in the siege of Wuchang were burned and destroyed to delay Qing advances led by Xiang Rong. Taiping forces took Jiujiang and Anqing in Anhui province virtually unopposed.

The Taiping forces reached Nanjing on March 6, with a strength that had grown to almost 750,000. The Taiping besieged the city for thirteen days, until three tunnels had been dug beneath city walls in order to plant explosives. Two of them exploded on time but the third one detonated late, killing many Taiping troops in friendly fire. On March 20, Taiping forces reached the Imperial City, the home of the Manchu Garrison and defended by more than 30,000 Manchu bannermen families. Qing forces were unable to contain a Taiping human wave attack and the Inner City fell quickly. The Taiping forces murdered about 30,000 family members of the Manchu soldiers after capturing the city.

During the battle the Taiping forces used spies disguised as Buddhist monks who successfully entered the city. They set fires alerting the Taiping where the weak points in the city were.
