= Tianjing Incident =

1856 internal conflict in the Taiping Heavenly Kingdom

- Part of Taiping Rebellion
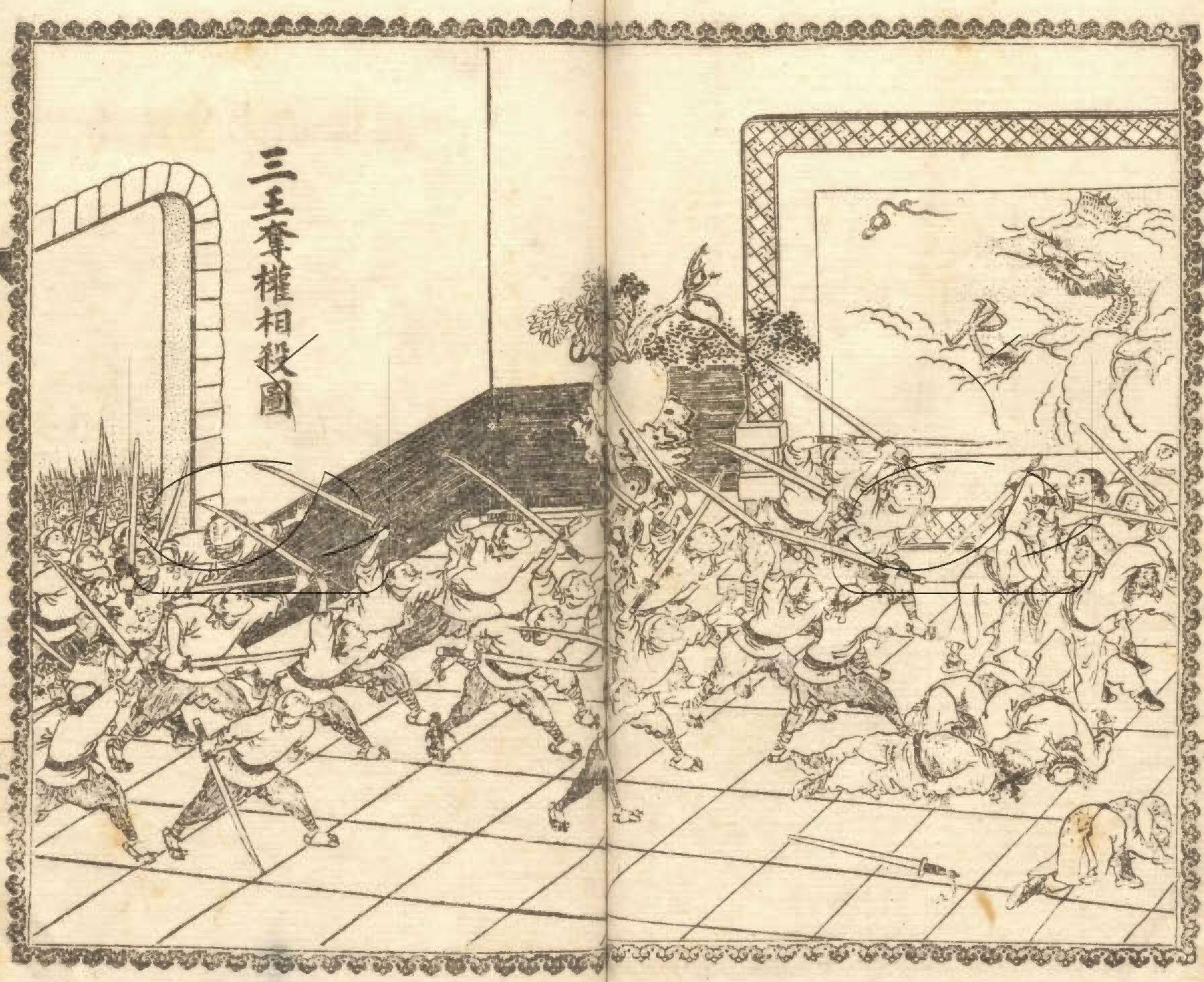
Date	September 2 – October, 1856
Location	Tianjing, Taiping Heavenly Kingdom (modern Nanjing, Jiangsu, China)
Result	Massive setback of the Taiping Rebellion, Shi Dakai takes control of all five Taiping armies

Factions
Yang Xiuqing †	Wei Changhui †; Qin Rigang †	Hong Xiuquan; Shi Dakai

Strength
6,000	Unknown	100,000

Casualties and losses
6,000	Unknown	Unknown
- 27,000+ opposition soldiers

The Tianjing Incident (Chinese: 天京事變; pinyin: Tiānjīng Shìbiàn) was a major internal political conflict within the Taiping Heavenly Kingdom occurring during the late Qing dynasty from September 2 to October 1856. The conflict itself took place in the Taiping's capital city Tianjing. A few key leaders of the Taiping Rebellion were killed: the East King Yang Xiuqing, the North King Wei Changhui and the Yan King Qin Rigang. More than 27,000 other opposition rivals including soldiers perished in the conflict as well. The Tianjing Incident was said to be one of the factors which led to the eventual failure of the Taiping Rebellion, as well as the turning point in its fate.

== Historical background ==
In 1851, the Taiping Rebellion's leader Hong Xiuquan conferred the title of 'King' on five of his most loyal followers and placed them under the jurisdiction of the East King Yang Xiuqing. After the deaths of the South King Feng Yunshan and the West King Xiao Chaogui, most of the power of the Taiping Heavenly Kingdom fell into the hands of Yang Xiuqing.

In the early years of the Taiping Rebellion, the real power of the military was in the hands of the Military Advisor (軍師), the military East King Yang Xiuqing, who gained more power following the deaths of the South and West Kings. Hong Xiuquan declared in 1848 that the spirit of the 'Holy Wind of the Heavenly Father' (天父) would possess Yang Xiuqing and give him orders through Yang. This had allowed Yang to become even more influential and placed him in a position higher than Hong, as Yang often gave orders to Hong, who was supposed to be his superior, in the name of the 'Holy Father'. When this happened, Hong had no choice but to follow the supposed orders of the 'Holy Father', which were actually Yang's orders.

After the Taiping Army captured Nanjing and established its capital city there, renaming it to Tianjing, Yang Xiuqing's relationships with the other Kings gradually worsened. The North King Wei Changhui was flogged on Yang Xiuqing's orders once, as his subordinate had offended Yang. Later, Wei's relative had a dispute over property with Yang's relative, which angered Yang. Yang Xiuqing called Wei Changhui to decide the punishment for Wei's relative together, and Wei replied that his relative should be torn into five parts. Once, the Yi King Shi Dakai's father-in-law Huang Yukun offended Yang Xiuqing and was ordered to be flogged 300 times, and his nobility title removed and demoted. In the same incident, the Yan Prince Qin Rigang and another high-ranking official Chen Chengrong were also flogged on Yang Xiuqing's orders. Even the Heavenly King was not spared from being flogged, as Yang often pretended that the 'Holy Father' had possessed him and used the name of the 'Holy Father' to punish Hong Xiuquan. Yang Xiuqing monopolised the power of the kingdom and became increasingly influential, making him feared and hated by the others, but none dared to oppose him.

== Events ==
On 20 June 1856, the Taiping Army defeated the Qing army led by Xiang Rong and lifted the three-year-long siege on Tianjing. Xiang Rong died on 9 August and news of his death reached Tianjing. The East King Yang Xiuqing saw that the Kingdom was functioning well and began to make his plans to seize power.

Shortly afterwards, Yang Xiuqing pretended to be possessed by the 'Holy Father' and summoned the Heavenly King Hong Xiuquan to his residence. There he asked the title of 'Ten Thousand Years' (Wansui) be conferred onto him in light of his contributions to the rebellion. Previously such a title was exclusively applied to Hong. Hong would outwardly agree, although he would later plan to have Yang executed which would ignite the incident itself.

Shortly before seeking a title commensurate with Hong Xiuquan's, Yang dispatched Wei Changhui, Shi Dakai, and Qin Rigang to separate provinces. Hong, viewing Yang's request as treasonous, alerted the three generals to return at once. Wei returned to Nanjing with three thousand troops on September 1, 1856, and found that Qin Rigang had already arrived. In consultation with Hong Xiuquan and his allies, the two generals decided not to wait for Shi Dakai's arrival. Instead, they and their troops immediately stormed Yang's palace and slew him before he could escape. They then slaughtered his family and followers within the palace, despite having agreed with Hong that only Yang was to die. At this point, six thousand of Yang's followers remained in Nanjing. Hong and his generals agreed to set a trap for those men. Hong pretended to arrest Wei and Qin Rigang for their actions and invited Yang's followers to watch as the two were beaten. Once the majority of Yang's followers were inside, the beatings ceased and Yang's followers were imprisoned inside the halls from which they were watching the beatings. The next morning, they were all systemically slaughtered. Killings of Yang's followers continued for three additional months.

Shi Dakai finally reached Nanjing in October and blamed Wei Changhui for the excessive bloodshed. Wei in turn suggested that Shi was a traitor Having been warned that he could be assassinated next, Shi fled Nanjing, leaving the same day he arrived. That night, Wei and Qin Rigang stormed Shi's mansion and slaughtered his family and retinue. Shi then consolidated an army of 100,000 and demanded the heads of Wei and Qin. Wei directed Qin to block Shi's advance and began plotting to imprison Hong Xiuquan. Hong Xiuquan was able to preempt those plans, however, and had his bodyguards kill Wei. Qin was lured back and killed shortly thereafter.

Later, Hong Xiuquan granted the deceased Yang Xiuqing amnesty and acquitted Yang of his crimes of harbouring the intention of usurping the throne. Yang Xiuqing's death was later marked as 'The East King ascends to Heaven'.

== Impacts ==
After the Tianjing Incident, the leaders of the rebellion gradually lost popular support from the people, and the rebellion started to decline. The military's morale was greatly shaken and they started losing battles against the Qing armies. The turn of tide caused the Taiping Heavenly Kingdom's territories to become gradually reduced and it fell towards the losing end.

After the deaths of the East King Yang Xiuqing and the North King Wei Changhui, the Yi King Shi Dakai was put in command of the Taiping Army and wielded control over the entire military. Hong Xiuquan was irate over Shi Dakai's popularity and feared that he might attempt to seize power again as Yang and Wei did, hence he appointed his brothers as Kings in order to weaken Shi Dakai's influence and prevent Shi from consolidating too much power. As Hong Xiuquan worked to undermine him, Shi Dakai realized that Hong's suspicions would not be dispelled, and that if he stayed he would either face murder or risk another civil war, Shi Dakai left Tianjing in 1857 with his army, which caused the Kingdom to be in greater peril. After the Tianjing Incident and Shi Dakai's departure, the position of Military Advisor (軍師) was not succeeded by anyone and existed only in name.
