= Qin Rigang =

19th-century Chinese military leader in the Taiping Rebellion

King of Yen Qin Rigang
- Born: 1821
- Died: 1856 (aged 34–35); Tianjing, Taiping Heavenly Kingdom (modern Nanjing, Jiangsu, China)
- Military career
- Nicknames: Guiping, Guangxi
- Conflicts: Taiping Rebellion: Jintian uprising; Battle of Nanjing (1853); Battle of Wuhan (1855); Tianjing incident

Qin Rigang (秦日綱, 1821 – 1856), né Qin Richang (秦日昌), was a Hakka military leader of the Taiping Rebellion, known during his military tenure as the King of Yan (燕王). He served under Hong Xiuquan's Taiping Administration and led Taiping forces to many military victories. He was executed by Hong Xiuquan in 1856 because he had killed the family and followers of Shi Dakai during the Tianjing Incident. Chen Yucheng and Li Xiucheng were trained and taught by Qin.

== Early life ==
Born in the Guiping district of Guangxi, Qin was a miner by trade, but had studied the military arts. He began following Hong Xiuquan in the early days of the God Worshipper movement and was counted among Hong's most trusted friends.

== Leadership in the Taiping Rebellion ==
Qin was entrusted with key military assignments by Hong Xiuquan and eventually became a marquis of the Taiping Heavenly Kingdom and its fourth most senior military officer, behind only Yang Xiuqing, Wei Changhui, and Shi Dakai. in 1854, Hong Xiuquan elevated him to the status of king, but this honor was subsequently revoked by Yang Xiuqing.

- Battle of Nanjing (1853): occupied Nanjing with Yang Xiuqing
- Occupied Wuhan (1855)
- Killed governor Jeer Hungar (1856)

The Jiangnan Daying were a military force employed twice by the Qing government to encircle Nanjing. The first time, 80,000 soldiers encircled Nanjing in March 1853, led by Qin Rigang and Li Xiucheng. In May 1856, he defeated forces under Imperial Commissioner Xiang Rong, forcing him to commit suicide.

== Tianjing Incident and Death ==
Qin was executed, along with Wei Changhui, during the Tianjing Incident, a major internal conflict within the Taiping Rebellion. While consolidating power, Yang Xiuqing had sought to humiliate Qin, going so far as to threaten him with imprisonment and enslavement for alleged failures in fulfilling his duties. Shortly before seeking a title commiserate with Hong Xiuquan's, Yang dispatched Qin, Shi Dakai, and Wei Changhui to separate provinces. Hong, viewing Yang's request as treasonous, alerted the three generals to return at once. Qin arrived in Nanjing before the other two generals and was joined by Wei and his three thousand troops on September 1, 1856. In consultation with Hong Xiuquan and his allies, the two generals decided not to wait for Shi Dakai's arrival. Instead, they and their troops immediately stormed Yang's palace and slew him before he could escape. They then slaughtered his family and followers within the palace, despite having agreed with Hong that only Yang was to die. At this point, six thousand of Yang's followers remained in Nanjing. Hong and his generals agreed to set a trap for those men. Hong pretended to arrest Qin and Wei Changhui for their actions and invited Yang's followers to watch as the two were beaten. Once the majority of Yang's followers were inside, the beatings ceased and Yang's followers were imprisoned inside the halls from which they were watching the beatings. The next morning, they were all systemically slaughtered. Killings of Yang's followers continued for three additional months.

Shi Dakai finally reached Nanjing in October and blamed Wei for the excessive bloodshed. Wei in turn suggested that Shi may be a traitor Having been warned that he could be assassinated next, Shi fled Nanjing, leaving the same day he arrived. That night, Wei and Qin Rigang stormed Shi's mansion and slaughtered his family and retinue. Shi then consolidated an army of 100,000 and demanded the heads of Wei and Qin. Qin was directed by Wei to block Shi's advance, while Wei plotted the imprisonment of Hong Xiuquan. Hong Xiuquan was able to preempt those plans, however, and had his bodyguards kill Wei. Qin was lured back and killed shortly thereafter.
