= Taiping Rebellion =

Major rebellion in China (1850–1864)

- Part of the century of humiliation
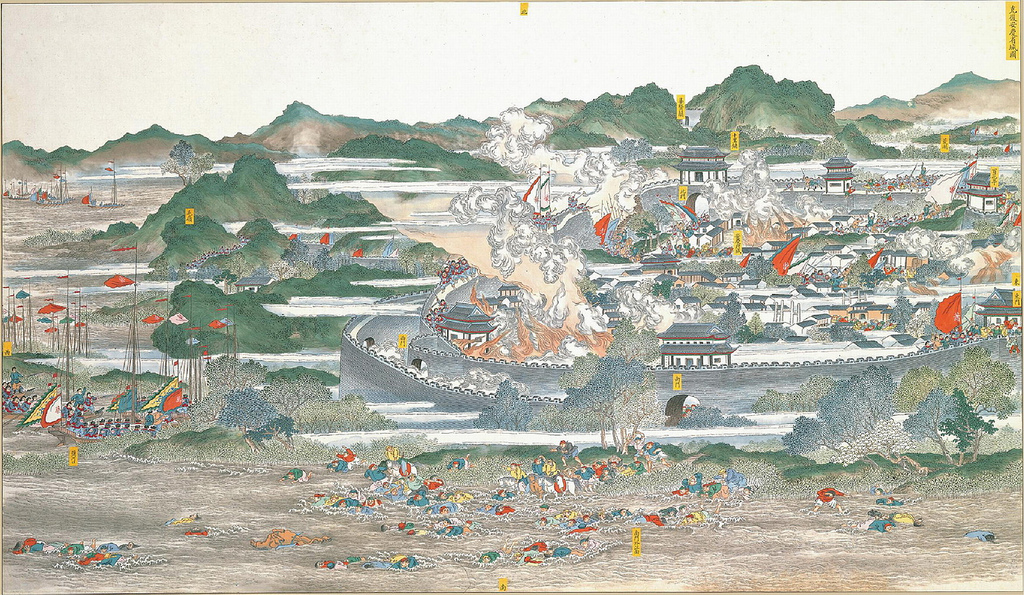
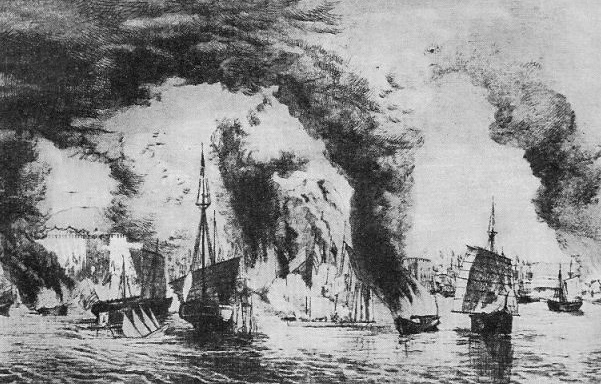
- Top: The Battle of Anqing (1861), 1884 painting Bottom: A battle on the Yangtze between Qing and Taiping naval forces
Date	December 1850 – August 1864
Location	China
Result	Qing victory

Belligerents
China; Later stages: France; United Kingdom	Taiping Heavenly Kingdom; Co-belligerents: Nian rebels; Red Turban rebels (Tiandihui); Small Swords Society; Miao rebels; Black Flag Army

Commanders and leaders
Xianfeng Emperor #; Empress Dowager Cixi; Zeng Guofan; Qishan #; Sengge Rinchen; Guanwen; Li Hongzhang; Luo Bingzhang; Jirhangga †; Zuo Zongtang; Zhang Guoliang †; He Chun †; Xiang Rong †; Frederick Townsend Ward †; Auguste Protet †; Charles George Gordon; Hampden Clement Blamire Moody	Hong Xiuquan #; Hong Tianguifu (executed); Hong Xuanjiao; Yang Xiuqing †; Feng Yunshan †; Xiao Chaogui †; Wei Changhui †; Hong Rengan (executed); Shi Dakai (executed); Li Xiucheng (executed); Chen Yucheng (executed); Li Shixian X; Qin Rigang (executed); Co-commanders: Zhang Lexing (executed) (Nian rebels); Su Sanniang (PKIA) (Nian rebels); Qiu Ersao † (Red Turban rebels); Liu Yongfu (Black Flag Army)

Strength
Eight Banners Army 250,000 Green Standard Army 611,200 (1851) Hunan Army 130,000 Huai Army 60,000‍–‍70,000 Chu Army 40,000 (1864) Ever Victorious Army 3,500‍–‍5,000 (1862)	Taiping Army 500,000 (1852) Combined Pro-Taiping Forces 2–10 million (at height)
- 10 million (all combatants involved)

Casualties and losses
- Total dead: 20–100 million

The Taiping Rebellion (1850–1864) was a civil war in late imperial China fought between the ruling Qing dynasty and the rebelling Taiping Heavenly Kingdom. It was the deadliest civil war in history and the second-deadliest conflict in history overall. Estimates of the war's death toll range from 20 to 30 million, around 5–10% of the total Chinese population at the time, to 73–100 million, around 25% of the population. The Rebellion is widely considered to be the most important event in 19th-century Chinese history, and although the kingdom was defeated, the victory came at a great cost to the Qing dynasty's economy and political stability.

The uprising was led by Hong Xiuquan, an ethnic Hakka who, after a series of visions, proclaimed himself to be the younger brother of Jesus Christ. Hong sought the religious conversion of the Han people to his syncretic version of Christianity, as well as the political overthrow of the Qing dynasty, and a general transformation of the mechanisms of state. Rather than supplanting China's ruling class, the Taiping rebels sought to entirely upend the country's social order. The Taiping Heavenly Kingdom in Nanjing seized control of significant portions of southern China. At its peak, the Heavenly Kingdom ruled over a population of nearly 30 million.

For more than a decade, Taiping armies occupied and fought across much of the mid- and lower Yangtze valley, ultimately devolving into civil war. It was the largest war in China since the Ming–Qing transition, involving most of Central and Southern China. It ranks as one of the bloodiest wars in human history, the bloodiest civil war, and the largest conflict of the 19th century, comparable to World War I in terms of deaths. Thirty million people fled the conquered regions to foreign settlements or other parts of China. The war was characterized by extreme brutality on both sides. Taiping soldiers carried out widespread massacres of Manchus, the ethnic minority of the ruling Imperial House of Aisin-Gioro. Meanwhile, the Qing government also engaged in massacres, most notably against the civilian population of Nanjing.

Weakened severely by internal conflicts following the failure of the campaign against Beijing (1853–1855) and an attempted coup in September and October 1856, the Taiping rebels were defeated by decentralised provincial armies such as the Xiang Army organised and commanded by Zeng Guofan. After moving down the Yangtze River and recapturing the strategic city of Anqing, Zeng's forces besieged Nanjing during May 1862. After two more years, on June 1, 1864, Hong Xiuquan died during the siege, caused from the consumption of weeds in the palace grounds as well as suspicions of poison. Nanjing fell barely a month later.

The 14-year civil war, along with the internal and external conflicts of the Opium Wars and the Boxer Rebellion, weakened the Qing dynasty's grasp on central China. The Taiping rebellion prompted the government's initially successful "Self-Strengthening Movement", but continued social and religious unrest exacerbated ethnic disputes and accelerated the rise of provincial powers. The Warlord Era, the loss of central control after the establishment of the Republic of China, would begin in earnest in 1912.

== Names ==
Territories of the Taiping Heavenly Kingdom. Held at various times during the rebellion Early period Late period

The terms which writers use for the conflict and its participants often represent their different opinions. During the 19th century, the Qing did not describe the conflict as either a civil war or a movement, because doing so would have lent credibility to the Taiping. Instead, they referred to the tumultuous civil war as a period of chaos (亂; luàn), rebellion (逆; nì) or military ascendancy (軍興; jūnxìng). They often referred to it as the Hong-Yang Rebellion (洪楊之亂; Hóngyáng zhī luàn), referring to the two most prominent leaders. It was also dismissively referred to as the Red Sheep Rebellion (紅羊之亂; Hóngyáng zhī luàn) because the two names sound similar in Chinese.

In modern China, the war is often referred to as the Taiping Heavenly Kingdom Movement (太平天國運動; Tàipíng tiānguó yùndòng), due to the fact that the Taiping espoused a doctrine which was both nationalist and communist, and the Taiping represented a popular ideology which was based on either Han nationalism or protocommunist values. The scholar Jian Youwen is among those who refer to the rebellion as the "Taiping Revolutionary Movement" on the grounds that it worked towards a complete change in the political and social system, rather than working towards the replacement of one dynasty with another.

Many Western historians refer to the conflict in general as the "Taiping Rebellion". In 2013, scholars such as Tobie Meyer-Fong and Stephen Platt argued that the term "Taiping Rebellion" is biased, because it insinuates that the Qing government was a legitimate government which was fighting against the illegitimate Taiping rebels. Instead, they argue that the conflict should be called a "civil war". Other historians such as Jürgen Osterhammel term the conflict the "Taiping Revolution" because of the rebels' radical transformational objectives and the social revolution that they initiated.

Little is known about how the Taiping referred to the war, but the Taiping often referred to the Qing in general and the Manchus in particular as some variant of demons or monsters (妖; yāo), representing Hong's proclamation that they were fighting a holy war to rid the world of demons and establish paradise on earth. The Qing referred to the Taiping as "Yue Bandits" (粵匪; Yuèfěi or 粵賊; Yuèzéi) in official sources, a reference to their origins in the southeastern province of Guangdong.

More colloquially, the Chinese called the Taiping some variant of Long-Hairs (長毛鬼, 長髪鬼, 髪逆, 髪賊), because they did not shave their foreheads and braid their hair into a queue as Qing subjects were obligated to do, allowing their hair to grow long.

== Background ==
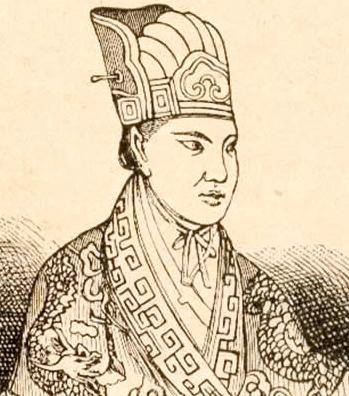
An alleged (Note: According to P. Richard Bohr, this is a woodblock print of an unidentified Taiping leader.) drawing of Hong Xiuquan, dating from around the early 1850s

During the 19th century, the Qing dynasty experienced a series of famines, natural disasters, economic problems and defeats at the hands of foreign powers. Farmers were heavily overtaxed, rents rose dramatically, and peasants started to desert their lands in droves. The Qing military had recently suffered a disastrous defeat in the First Opium War, while the Chinese economy was severely impacted by a trade imbalance caused by the large-scale and illicit importation of opium. Banditry became common, and numerous secret societies and self-defense units formed, all of which led to an increase in small-scale warfare.

Meanwhile, the population of China had nearly doubled between 1766 and 1833, while the amount of cultivated land remained the same. The government, commanded by ethnic Manchus, had become increasingly corrupt, and was weak in southern regions where local clans dominated. Anti-Manchu sentiment was strongest in southern China among the Hakka community, a Han Chinese subgroup. Meanwhile, Christian missionaries were active.

In 1837, Hong Huoxiu, a Hakka from a poor village in Guangdong, failed the imperial examination for the third time, frustrating his ambition to become a scholar-official in the civil service and leading him to a nervous breakdown. While recovering, Hong dreamed of visiting Heaven, where he discovered that he possessed a celestial family distinct from his earthly family. His heavenly father lamented that men were worshiping demons rather than himself and informed Hong that his given name violated taboos and had to be changed, suggesting "Hong Xiuquan", the moniker ultimately adopted by Hong. In later embellishments, Hong declared that he saw Confucius being punished by his celestial father for leading the people astray.

In 1843, Hong failed the imperial examinations for the fourth and final time. It was only then, prompted by a visit by his cousin, that Hong took time to carefully examine Christian pamphlets he had received from a Protestant Christian missionary several years earlier. After reading these pamphlets, Hong came to believe that they had given him the key to interpreting his visions: his celestial father was God the Father, the elder brother that he had seen was Jesus Christ, and he had been directed to rid the world of demons, including the corrupt Qing government and Confucian teachings.

In 1847, Hong went to Guangzhou, where he studied the Bible with Issachar Jacox Roberts, an American Baptist missionary. Roberts refused to baptize him and later stated that Hong's followers were "bent on making their burlesque religious pretensions serve their political purpose".

A map of the Qing dynasty c. 1820

In 1844, soon after Hong began preaching across Guangxi, his follower Feng Yunshan founded the God Worshipping Society, a movement which followed Hong's fusion of Christianity, Taoism, Confucianism and indigenous millenarianism, which Hong presented as a restoration of the ancient Chinese faith in Shangdi. The Taiping faith, says one historian, "developed into a dynamic new Chinese religion ... Taiping Christianity".

In the late 1840s, the movement at first grew by suppressing groups of bandits and pirates in southern China. Suppression by Qing authorities led it to evolve into guerrilla warfare and subsequently a widespread civil war. Eventually, two other God Worshipers claimed to possess the ability to speak as members of the "Celestial Family", the Father in the case of Yang Xiuqing and Jesus Christ in the case of Xiao Chaogui.

== 1850–1853: Outbreak and initial stages ==
The Taiping Rebellion began in the southern province of Guangxi when local officials launched a campaign of religious persecution against the God Worshipping Society. In early January 1851, following a small-scale battle in late December 1850, a 10,000-strong rebel army organized by Feng Yunshan and Wei Changhui routed Qing forces stationed in Jintian (present-day Guiping, Guangxi). Taiping forces successfully repulsed an attempted imperial reprisal by the Green Standard Army against the Jintian uprising.

On January 11, 1851, Hong declared himself the Heavenly King of the Heavenly Kingdom of Peace, or Taiping Heavenly Kingdom, from which comes the term "Taipings" commonly used for them in English-language studies. In September 1851, the Taipings began marching north to escape Qing forces closing in on them. The Taiping army pressed north into Hunan following the Xiang River, besieging Changsha, occupying Yuezhou, and capturing Wuchang in December 1852 after reaching the Yangtze River. At this point, the Taiping leadership decided to move east along the Yangtze River. In February 1853, Anqing was captured.

Taiping leaders may have reached out to Triad organizations, which had many cells in South China and among government troops. Taiping titles echoed Triad usage, whether consciously or not, which made it more attractive for Triads to join the movement. In 1852, Qing government troops captured Hong Daquan, a rebel who had assumed the title Tian De Wang (King of Heavenly Virtue). Hong Daquan's confession claimed that Hong Xiuquan had made him co-sovereign of the Heavenly Kingdom and given him that title, but was more likely an echo of an earlier but unconnected White Lotus Rebellion. However, the capture of Nanjing in that year led to a deterioration of relations between the Taiping rebels and the triads.

== 1853–1860: Control of Nanjing and expeditions ==
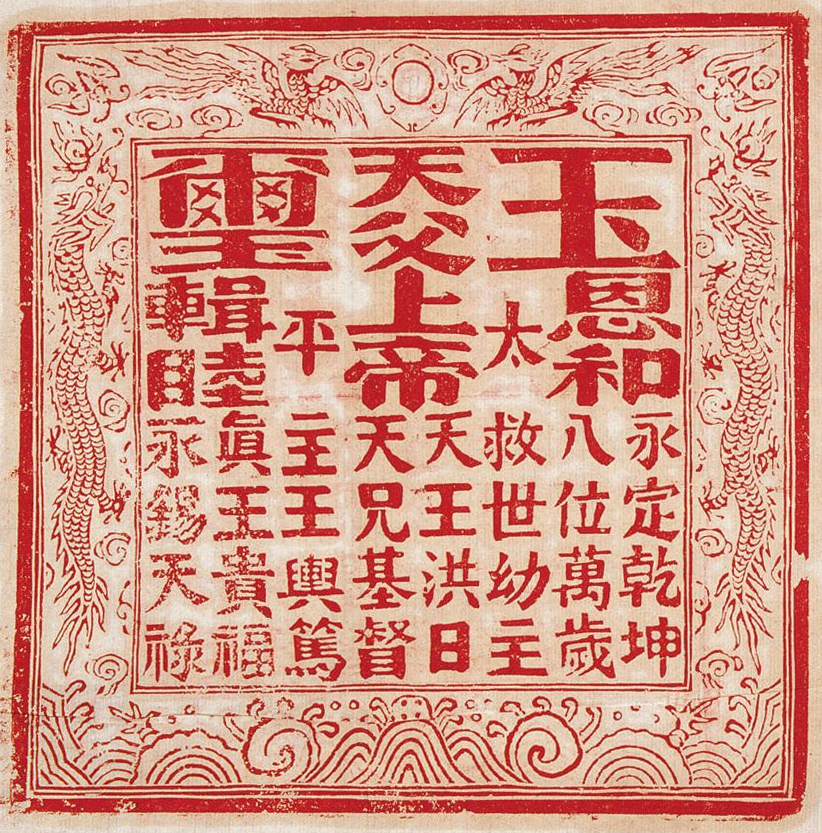
The royal seal of the Taiping Heavenly Kingdom

On March 19, 1853, the Taipings captured the city of Nanjing and Hong renamed it "Tianjing", or the 'heavenly capital' of his kingdom. Since the Taipings considered the Manchus to be demons, they first killed all the Manchu men, then forced the Manchu women outside the city and burned them to death. Shortly thereafter, the Taiping launched concurrent Northern and Western expeditions, in an effort to relieve pressure on Nanjing and achieve significant territorial gains. The Northern expedition was a complete failure but the Western achieved limited success.

In 1853, Hong Xiuquan withdrew from active control of policies and administration to rule exclusively by written proclamations. He lived in luxury and had many women in his inner chamber, and often issued religious strictures. He clashed with Yang Xiuqing, who challenged his often impractical policies, and became suspicious of Yang's ambitions, his extensive network of spies and his claims of authority when "speaking as God". This tension culminated in the 1856 Tianjing Incident, with Yang and his followers slaughtered by Wei Changhui, Qin Rigang, and their troops on Hong Xiuquan's orders.

Shi Dakai's objection to the bloodshed led to his family and retinue being killed by Wei and Qin with Wei ultimately planning to imprison Hong. Wei's plans were ultimately thwarted and he and Qin were executed by Hong. Shi Dakai was given control of five Taiping armies, which were consolidated into one. Fearing for his life, he departed from Tianjing and headed west towards Sichuan.

With Hong withdrawn from view and Yang out of the picture, the remaining Taiping leaders tried to widen their popular support and forge alliances with European powers, but failed on both counts. The Europeans decided to stay officially neutral, though European military advisors served with the Qing army.

Inside China, the rebellion faced resistance from the traditionalist rural classes because of hostility to Chinese culture and Confucian values. The landowning upper class, unsettled by the Taiping ideology and the policy of strict separation of the sexes, even for married couples, sided with government forces.

In Hunan, the local irregular Xiang Army under the personal leadership of Zeng Guofan, became the main force fighting the Taiping on behalf of the Qing. Zeng's Xiang Army proved effective in gradually turning back the Taiping advance in the western theater of the war and ultimately retaking much of Hubei and Jiangxi provinces. In December 1856, Qing forces retook Wuchang for the final time. In May 1858, the Xiang Army captured Jiujiang and then the rest of Jiangxi by September.

In 1859, Hong Rengan, Hong Xiuquan's cousin, joined the Taiping forces in Nanjing and was given considerable power by Hong. Hong Rengan developed an ambitious plan to expand the Taiping Heavenly Kingdom's boundaries.

In May 1860, the Taiping defeated the imperial forces that had been besieging Nanjing since 1853, eliminating them from the region and opening the way for a successful invasion of southern Jiangsu and Zhejiang provinces, the wealthiest region of the Qing Empire. The Taiping rebels were successful in taking Hangzhou on March 19, 1860, Changzhou on May 26, and Suzhou on June 2 to the east. While Taiping forces were preoccupied in Jiangsu, Zeng's forces moved down the Yangtze River.

== 1861–1864: Faltering and collapse ==
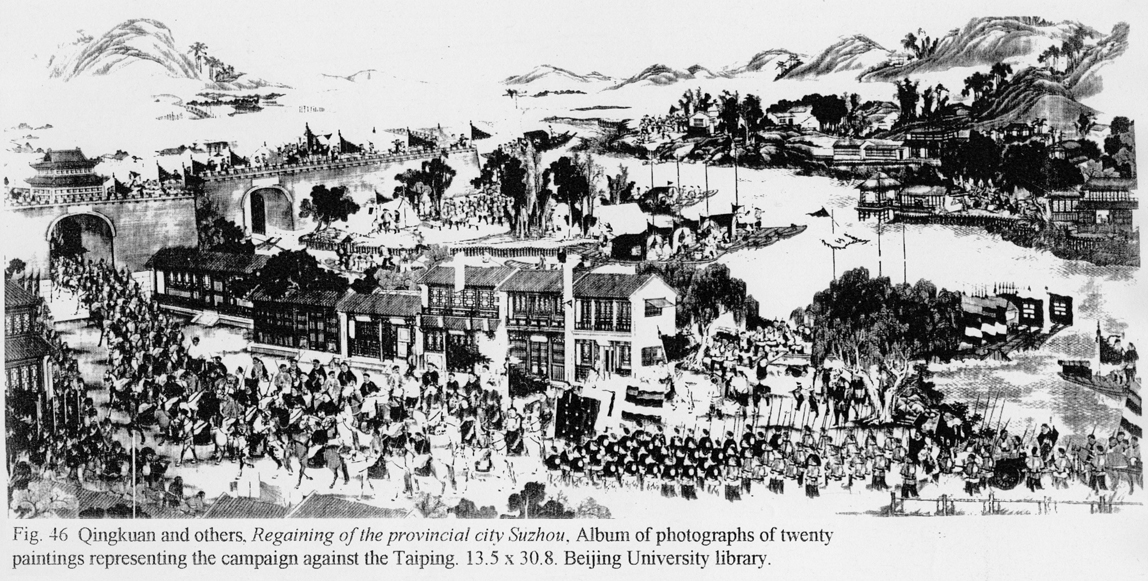
Qing troops retaking Suzhou

An attempt to take Shanghai begun in June 1861 was repulsed after 15 months by an army of Qing troops supported by European officers under the command of Frederick Townsend Ward. This army would become known as the "Ever Victorious Army", a seasoned and well-trained Qing military force commanded by Charles George Gordon.

In 1861, around the time of the death of the Xianfeng Emperor and ascension of the Tongzhi Emperor, Zeng Guofan's Xiang Army captured Anqing with help from a naval blockade imposed by the Royal Navy on the city. Near the end of 1861 the Taipings launched a final Eastern Expedition. Ningbo was easily captured on December 9. Hangzhou was besieged and captured on December 31. In January 1862, Taiping troops surrounded Shanghai, but were unable to capture it.

In 1862, the Ever-Victorious Army repulsed another attack on Shanghai and helped to defend other treaty ports such as Ningbo, reclaimed on May 10. They also aided imperial troops in reconquering Taiping strongholds along the Yangtze River.

In 1863, Shi Dakai surrendered to the Qing near the Sichuan capital Chengdu and was executed by slow-slicing. Some of his followers escaped or were released and continued the fight against the Qing.

Qing forces were reorganized under the command of Zeng Guofan, Zuo Zongtang, and Li Hongzhang, and the Qing reconquest began in earnest. Zeng Guofan had initially failed so badly that he attempted suicide, but he then adopted the teachings of the 16th-century Ming general Qi Jiguang. He bypassed the professional regular armies and recruited from local villages, paying and drilling them well. Zeng, Zuo, and Li led personally loyal soldiers. By early 1864, Qing control in most areas had been reestablished.

In May 1862, the Xiang Army besieged Nanjing. Attempts to break the siege by the numerically superior Taiping Army failed. Hong Xiuquan declared that God would defend the city. The city's food supplies ran low. Hong contracted food poisoning from eating wild vegetables; the intent may have been suicide. He died in June 1864 after a 20-day illness.

Hong was succeeded by his eldest son Hong Tianguifu, who was 15 years old. The younger Hong was inexperienced and powerless; Nanjing fell in July 1864 to the imperial armies after protracted street-by-street fighting in the Third Battle of Nanjing. Tianguifu and few others escaped but were soon caught and executed. Most of the Taiping princes were executed.

On August 1, Zeng Guofan ordered Hong's body exhumed for verification, and desecrated as spiritual punishment. After exhumation, it was dismembered, cremated, and its ashes were fired from a cannon to scatter them irretrievably.

A small remainder of loyal Taiping forces had continued to fight in northern Zhejiang, rallying around Tianguifu. After Tianguifu's capture on October 25, 1864, Taiping resistance was gradually pushed into the highlands of Jiangxi, Zhejiang, Fujian, and finally Guangdong, where one of the last Taiping loyalists, Wang Haiyang, was defeated on January 29, 1866.

== Aftermath ==
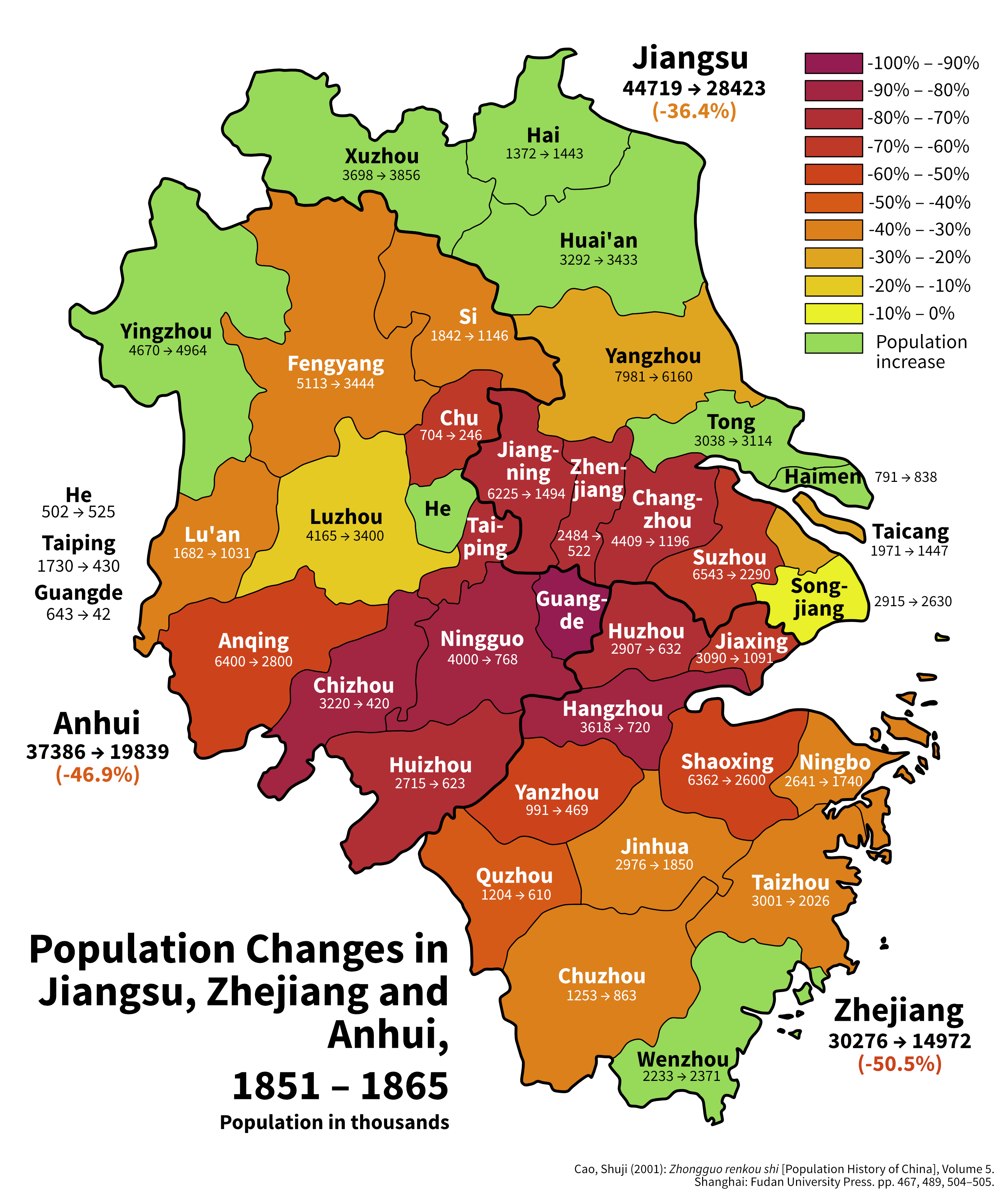
Estimated population change by prefecture in Jiangsu, Zhejiang and Anhui from 1851 to 1865

Although the fall of Nanjing in 1864 marked the destruction of the Taiping regime, the fight was not yet over. There were still several hundred thousand Taiping troops continuing the fight, with more than a quarter-million fighting in the border regions of Jiangxi and Fujian alone. In August 1871, the last Taiping army led by Shi Dakai's commander, Li Fuzhong (李福忠), was completely wiped out by government forces in the border region of Hunan, Guizhou and Guangxi.

Taiping wars also spilled over into Vietnam with devastating effects. In 1860, Wu Lingyun (吳凌雲), an ethnic Zhuang Taiping leader, proclaimed himself King of Tingling (廷陵國) in the Sino-Vietnamese border regions. Dingling was destroyed during a Qing campaign in 1868. His son Wu Yazhong, also called Wu Kun (吳鯤), fled to Vietnam. He was killed in 1869 in Thái Nguyên by a Qing-Vietnamese coalition headed by Feng Zicai.

Wu Kun's troops broke up and became marauding armies such as the Yellow Flag Army led by Huang Chongying (黃崇英) and the Black Flag Army led by Liu Yongfu. Liu Yongfu became a prominent warlord in Upper Tonkin and later helped the Nguyễn dynasty to engage against the French during the Sino-French War in the 1880s. He later became the second and last leader of the short-lived Republic of Formosa.

Other "Flag Gangs" armed with the latest weapons, disintegrated into bandit groups that plundered remnants of the Lan Xang kingdom. They were then engaged in the Haw wars (misnamed due to conflation with Chinese Muslims) against the forces of King Rama V until 1890, when the last of the groups eventually disbanded.

=== Death toll ===
With no reliable census at the time, estimates of the death toll of the Taiping Rebellion are speculative. The most widely cited sources estimate the total number of deaths during the almost 14 years of the rebellion to be approximately 20 to 30 million civilians and soldiers. Most of the deaths were attributed to plague and famine. Some analysts have claimed that the death toll may have reached 100 million.

=== Concurrent rebellions ===
A battle during the Panthay Rebellion, from the Victory over the Muslims silk painting set

The Nian Rebellion (1853–1868), and several Chinese Muslim rebellions in the southwest (the Panthay Rebellion, 1855–1873) and the northwest (Dungan revolt, 1862–1877) continued to pose considerable problems for the Qing dynasty.

Occasionally, the Nian rebels collaborated with Taiping forces, for instance, they collaborated during the Northern Expedition. As the Taiping rebellion lost ground, particularly after the fall of Nanjing in 1864, former Taiping soldiers and commanders like Lai Wenguang were incorporated into Nian ranks.

After the failure of the Red Turban Rebellion (1854–1856) to capture Guangzhou, their soldiers retreated north into Jiangxi and joined forces with Shi Dakai. After the defeat of the Li Yonghe and Lan Chaoding rebellion in Sichuan, remnants combined with Taiping forces in Shaanxi. Remnant forces of the Small Swords Society uprising in Shanghai regrouped with the Taiping army.

Du Wenxiu, who led the Panthay Rebellion in Yunnan, was in contact with the Taiping Heavenly Kingdom. He was not waging his rebellion against Han Chinese, instead, he was anti-Qing and he wanted to destroy the Qing government. Du's forces led many non-Muslim forces, including Han Chinese, Li, Bai, and Hani peoples. They were assisted by non-Muslim Shan and Kachin people and other hill tribes in the revolt.

The other Muslim rebellion, the Dungan revolt, was the reverse: it was not aiming to overthrow the Qing dynasty because its leader Ma Hualong had accepted an imperial title. Instead, it erupted as a result of intersectional fighting between Muslim factions and Han Chinese. During the Dungan revolt, various groups fought against each other without any coherent goal. According to modern researchers, the Dungan rebellion began in 1862, not as a planned uprising but as a coalescence of local brawls and riots triggered by trivial causes. Among these causes were false rumors that the Hui Muslims were aiding the Taiping rebels. The Hui Ma Xiaoshi claimed that the Shaanxi Muslim rebellion was connected to the Taiping. Jonathan Spence claims that a key reason for the Taiping's defeat was its inability to coordinate its rebellion with other rebellions.

== Policies ==
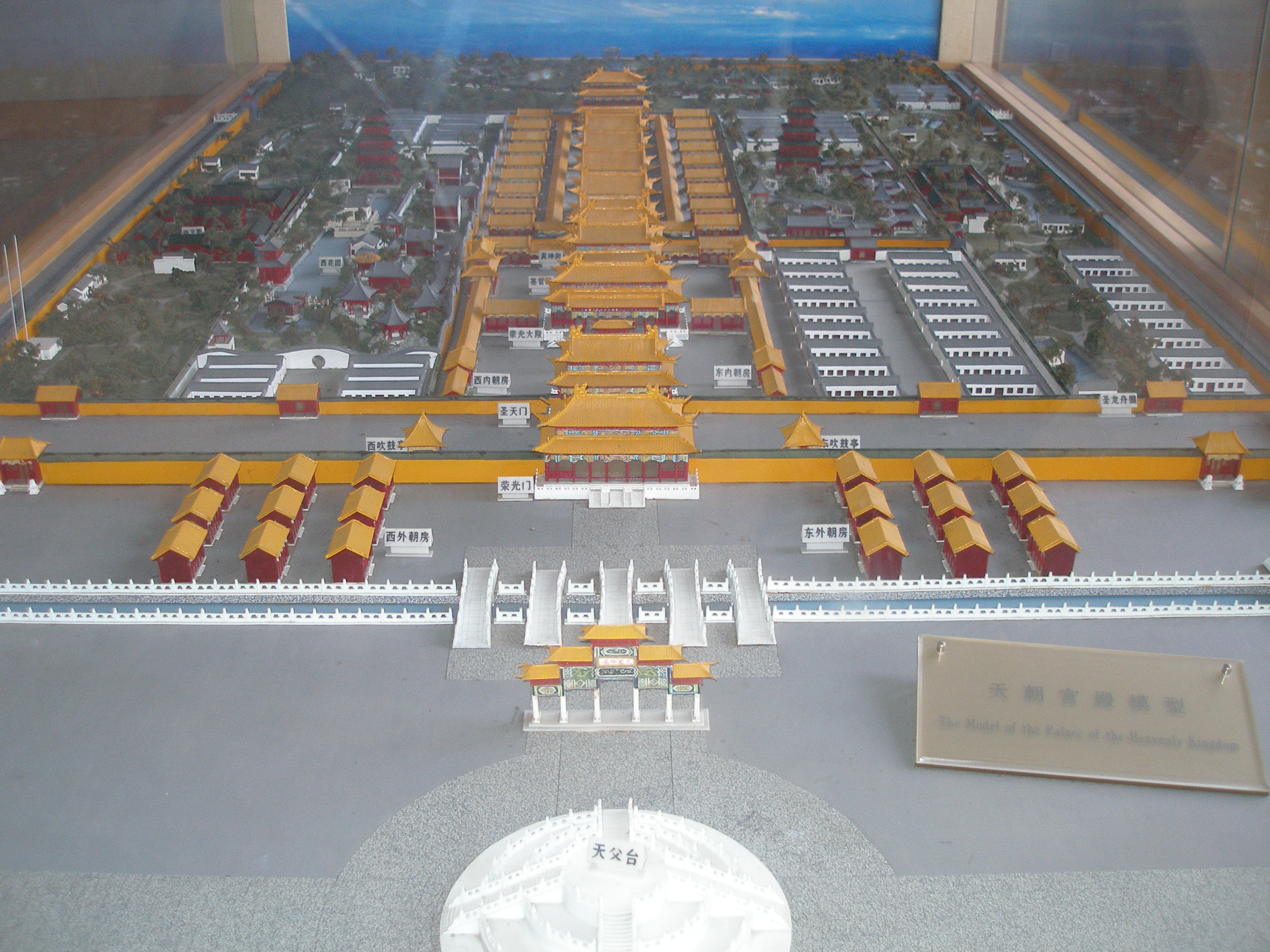
A miniature of the Palace of Heavenly Kingdom in Nanjing

The rebels announced social reforms, including strict separation of the sexes, abolition of foot binding, land socialisation, and "suppression" of private trade. They also outlawed the importation of opium into all Taiping territories. In regard to religion, the Kingdom replaced Confucianism, Buddhism, and Chinese folk religion with the Taiping Christianity, God Worshipping, which held that Hong Xiuquan was the younger brother of Jesus and the second son of God. Buddhist libraries were burned. Because Hong saw Confucianism was a shadow of its noble origin, being now a tool of the Qing to tyrannize Han people, libraries of the Confucian monasteries were destroyed—in the Yangtze delta, almost entirely—and the temples were often defaced or turned into temples of his new religion or hospitals and libraries.

Traditionalist works like those of Confucius were burned and their sellers executed. The Taiping were especially opposed to idolatry, destroying idols wherever found with great prejudice. Though the destruction of idols was initially welcomed by foreign missionaries, missionaries eventually came to fear the zealotry of the Taiping that they had a hand in creating.

Separation of the sexes was strictly enforced in the first few years, although it tapered off in later years. Part of the extremeness came from a mistranslation of the Ten Commandments, which led to the seventh commandment also forbidding "licentiousness" as well as adultery. It was so severe that parents and children of the opposite sex could not interact, and even married couples were discouraged from having sex.

== Military ==
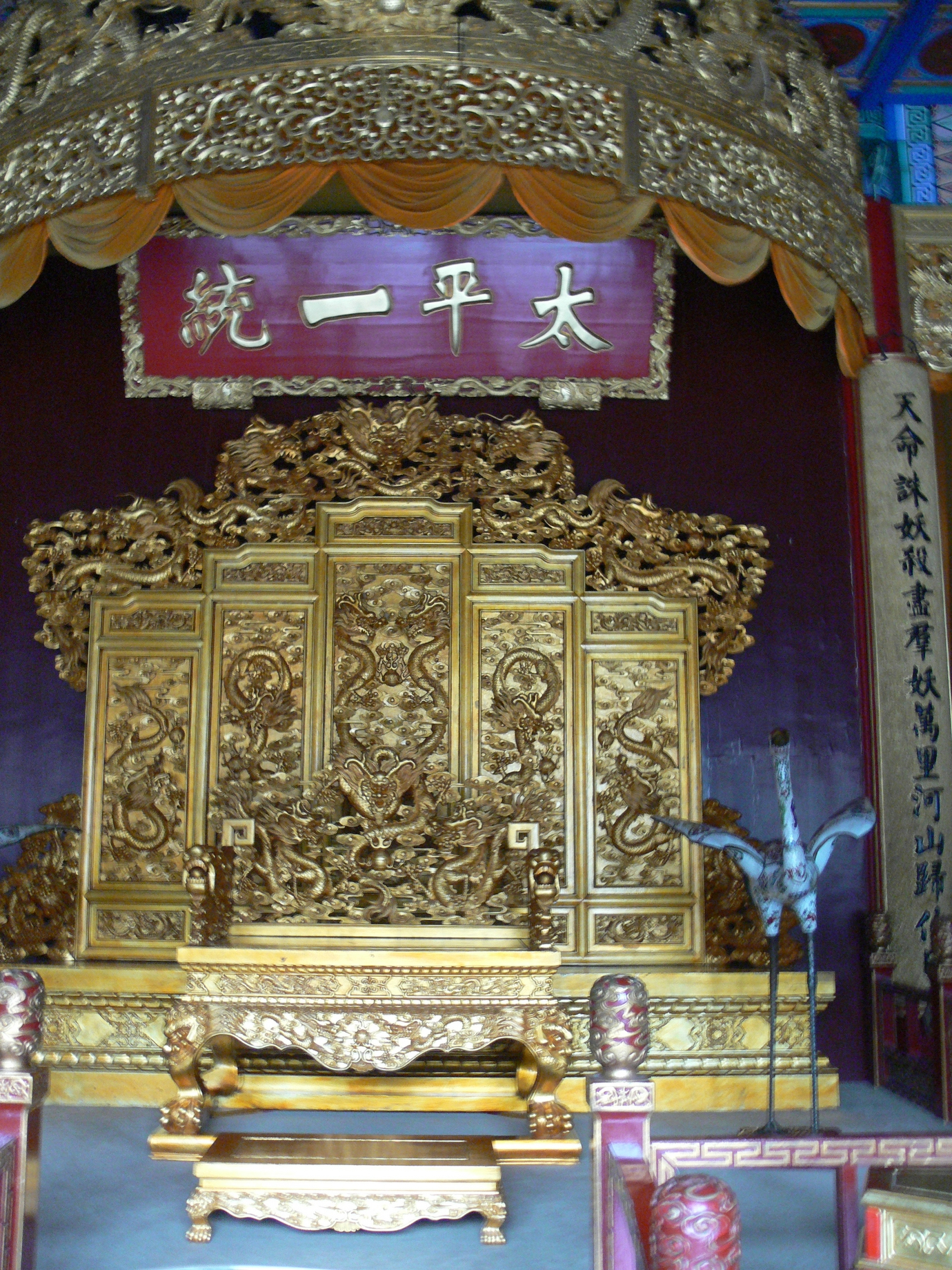
The Heavenly King's throne in Nanjing

The rebels used brilliant unorthodox strategies that nearly toppled the dynasty but inspired it to adopt what one historian calls "the most significant military experimentation since the seventeenth century." The Taiping army was marked by a high level of discipline and fanaticism. They typically wore a uniform of red jackets with blue trousers, and grew their hair long so in China they were nicknamed "long hair". In the beginning of the rebellion, the large numbers of women serving in the Taiping army also distinguished it from other 19th-century armies. However, after 1853 there ceased being many women in the Taiping army. Hong Xuanjiao, Su Sanniang, and Qiu Ersao are examples of women who became leaders of the Taiping army's female soldiers.

Combat was always bloody and extremely brutal, with little artillery but huge forces equipped with small arms. Both armies would attempt to push each other off of the battlefield, and though casualties were high, few battles were decisively won. The Taiping army's main strategy of conquest was to take major cities, consolidate their hold on the cities, then march out into the surrounding countryside to recruit local farmers and battle government forces.

Estimates of the size of the Taiping army are around 500,000 soldiers in 1852. The army's organization was allegedly inspired by that of the Qin dynasty. Each army corps consisted of roughly 13,000 men. These corps were placed into armies of varying sizes. In addition to the main Taiping forces organized along the above lines, there were also thousands of pro-Taiping groups fielding their own forces of irregulars.

The rebels were relatively well equipped with modern weapons. They were not supported by foreign governments, but they bought modern munitions—including firearms, artillery, and ammunition—from foreign suppliers. The rebels were buying weapons by 1853. Munitions—partially sourced from Western manufacturers and military stores—were smuggled into China, mainly by the English and Americans. In fact due to English and American smuggling through the British Concession and American Concession of Shanghai, the Qing dynasty had a brief battle with them, in which the British and Americans teamed up with the Taiping rebels, in the Battle of Muddy Flat. Later, in April 1862, a shipment from an American dealer "well known for their dealings with rebels" included 2,783 (percussion cap) muskets, 66 carbines, 4 rifles, and 895 field artillery guns; the dealer carried passports signed by the Loyal King.

The rebels also manufactured weapons, and imported manufacturing equipment. In the summer of 1862, a Western observer noted that rebel factories in Nanjing were producing superior guns—including heavy cannon—than the Qing. The rebels augmented their modern arsenal with captured equipment. Just before his execution, Taiping Loyal King Li Xiucheng advised the Qing to buy, and to learn how to replicate, the best foreign cannon and gun carriages to prepare for war with foreign powers.

As early as 1853, foreigners from various countries joined the rebels in combat and administrative roles, and were in a position to observe the Taiping in battle. The rebels were courageous under fire, erected defensive works quickly, and used mobile pontoon bridges. One tactic was to ring a Qing emplacement in fire and kill the fleeing Qing troops as they emerged individually.

There was also a small Taiping Navy, composed of captured boats, that operated along the Yangtze and its tributaries. Among the Navy's commanders was the Hang king Tang Zhengcai.

=== Demographics ===
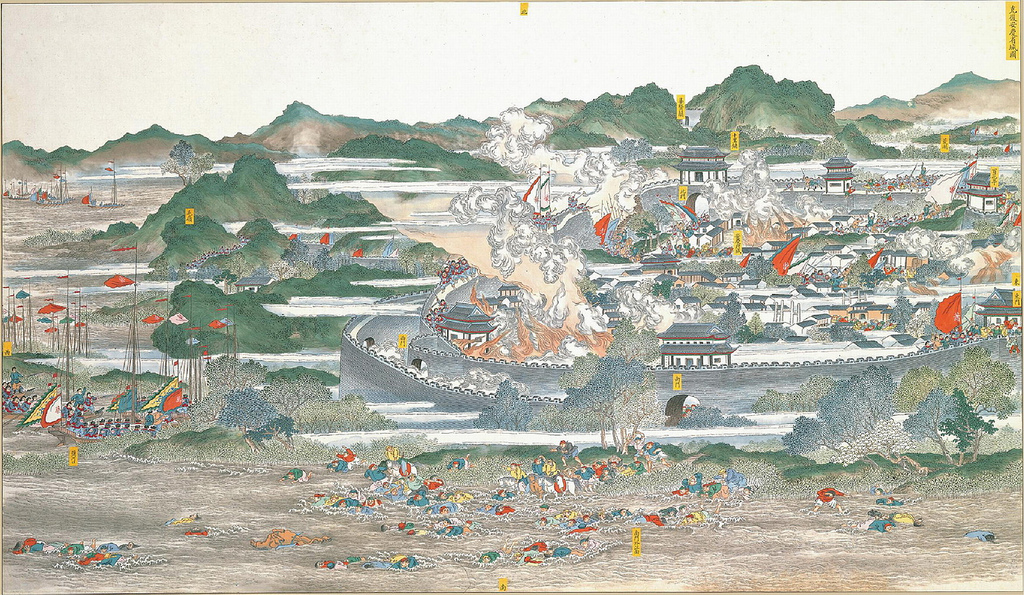
Retaking the provincial city of Anqing

Ethnically, the Taiping army was at the outset formed largely from these groups: the Hakka, a Han Chinese subgroup; local residents of Guangdong; and the Zhuang (a non-Han ethnic group). However, as the territories expanded to the Yangtze River Delta, including cities of Nanjing and Suzhou, its army largely became sourced from the Yangtze River Delta population. At the end of the war, the Yangtze River Delta provinces of Anhui, Southern Jiangsu, Northern Zhejiang, and Northern Jiangxi were severely depopulated.

=== Social structure ===
Socially and economically, the Taiping rebels came almost exclusively from the lowest classes. Many of the southern Taiping troops were former miners, especially those coming from the Zhuang. Very few Taiping rebels, even in the leadership caste, came from the imperial bureaucracy. Almost none were landlords and in occupied territories landlords were often executed.

=== Qing forces ===
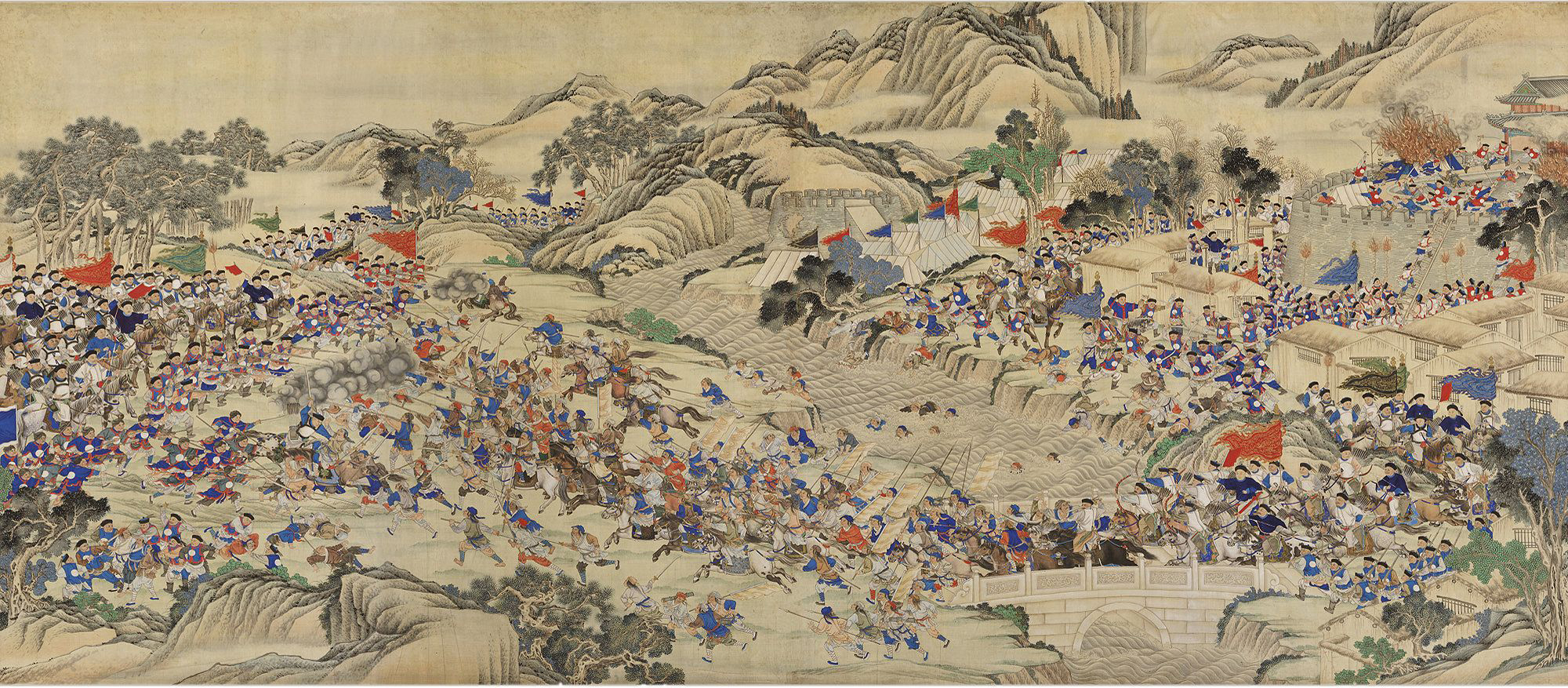
Qing forces retaking Run Prefecture

Opposing the rebellion was an imperial army with over a million regulars and unknown thousands of regional militias and foreign mercenaries operating in support. Among the imperial forces was the elite Ever Victorious Army, consisting of Chinese soldiers led by a Western officer corps (see Frederick Townsend Ward and Charles Gordon) and supplied by European arms companies like Willoughbe & Ponsonby.

A particularly famous imperial force was Zeng Guofan's Xiang Army. Zuo Zongtang from Hunan province was another important Qing general who contributed in suppressing the Taiping Rebellion. Where the armies under the control of dynasty itself were unable to defeat the Taiping, these gentry-led Yong Ying armies were able to succeed.

Although keeping accurate records was something imperial China traditionally did very well, the decentralized nature of the imperial war effort (relying on regional forces) and the fact that the war was a civil war and therefore very chaotic, meant that reliable figures are impossible to find. The destruction of the Taiping Heavenly Kingdom also meant that the majority of any records it possessed were destroyed, the percentage of records said to have survived is around 10%.

Over the course of the conflict, around 90% of recruits to the Taiping side were killed or defected.

Aside from local militias, the organisation of the Qing army was:

- Eight Banners Army: 250,000 soldiers
- Green Standard Army: 611,200 soldiers in 1851
- Xiang Army (Hunan): 130,000 soldiers
- Huai Army (Anhui): 60,000–70,000 soldiers
- Chu Army: 40,000 soldiers in 1864
- Ever Victorious Army: 3,500–5,000 soldiers in 1862

== Relationship with the Western powers ==
The Taiping government maintained an ambivalent relationship with the Western powers who were active in China during this period. Due to the religious aspects of the rebellion, the Taiping government perceived Westerners as "brothers and sisters from overseas". The Taiping government proved especially welcoming to Western missionaries. In 1853, Hong Xiuquan invited American missionary Issachar Jacox Roberts to come to Nanjing to aid in the administration of his government. After Roberts arrived in Nanjing in 1861 and met with Hong, he was commissioned by him as the director of foreign affairs.

While some missionaries like Roberts were enthusiastic in the first few years about the Taiping rebellion, Western skepticism existed from the inception of the rebellion. According to historian Prescott Clarke, Westerners in China became separated into two different groups in regards to their views on the rebellion, with one side depicting the rebels as mere robbers whose intention was to gather wealth through revolting against the Qing, and the other side depicting the rebel army as religious fanatics provoked by skillful leaders to fight against the Qing to the death.

The government officials of the Western powers were optimistic about the Taiping government's chance of victory in the early stages. According to historian Eugene P. Boardman, the Qing dynasty's enforcement of the treaty of 1842–1844 was frustrating US and British officials, especially in terms of open trade. According to Boardman the Christian nature of the Taiping opened up the possibility for a more cooperative trade partnership. Many Western officials visited the capital of Taiping between 1863 and 1864, and American commissioner Robert Milligan McLane considered granting official recognition of the Taiping government.

According to Clarke the Western missionaries changed their opinions upon further inspections of the rebellion. That change was captured in a letter from the American missionary Divie Bethune McCartee. Upon visiting Nanjing, McCartee described the situation in the city as "Dreadful destruction of life." As for the actual practice of Christianity in the city, McCartee said "I saw no signs of anything resembling Christianity in or near [Nanjing]". Similarly to McCartee, Hong's director of foreign affairs I. J. Roberts wrote, "His religious toleration, and multiplicity of chapels turns out to be a farce, of no avail in the spread of Christianity—worse than useless."

After the conclusion of the Second Opium War, Royal Navy officer Sir James Hope led an expedition to Nanjing in February 1861. This expedition was the largest party of Westerners to visit Taiping territories, with the inclusion of many British military personnel, entrepreneurs, missionaries, other unofficial observers and two French representatives. Upon visiting the capital, some members of the expedition wrote that "devastation marked our journey" in reference to the conditions in Taiping territories. Some reports suggested a great deal of indiscriminate slaughter of civilians conducted by the Taiping army in newly controlled areas.

In late 1861, Hope made a brief visit to Nanjing to come to an agreement with the Taiping rebels not to attack the city of Shanghai, a proposal which was refused by the Taiping government. According to Clarke, this refusal of cooperation and Taiping's occupation of Ningbo in December led to the limited intervention against the rebellion by the British and French in the following years. Western assistance for the Qing was also driven by the fear that a successful rebellion would lead to a stronger China able to resist Western power.

== Total war ==
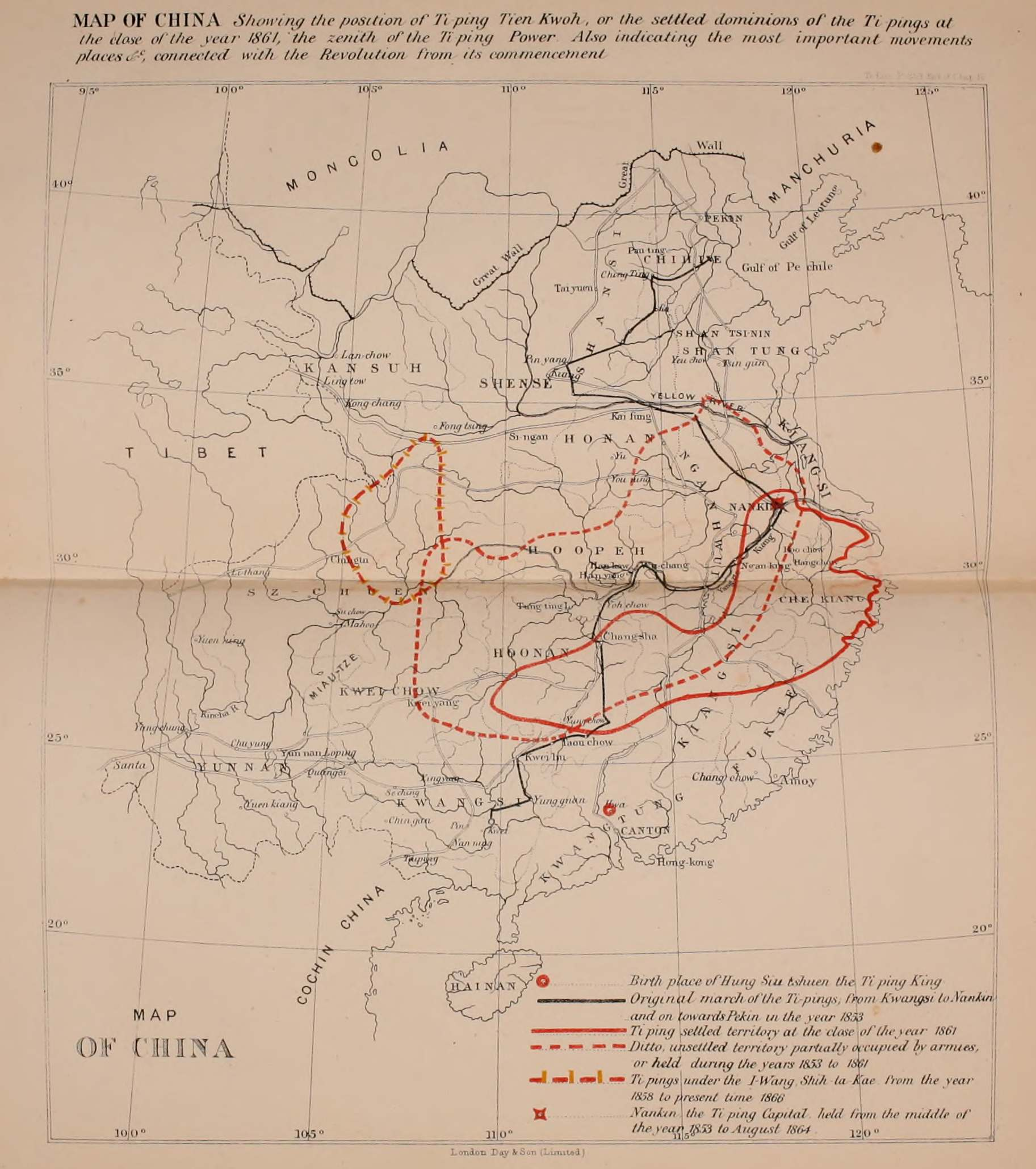
A map of the Taiping Rebellion, 1866

The Taiping Rebellion was a total war. Almost every citizen who had not fled the Taiping Heavenly Kingdom was given military training and conscripted into the army to fight against Qing imperial forces. Under the Taiping household registration system, one adult male from each household was to be conscripted into the army.

During this conflict, both sides tried to deprive each other of the resources which they needed in order to continue the war and it became standard practice for each to destroy the opposing side's agricultural areas, butcher the populations of cities and generally exact a brutal price from the inhabitants of captured enemy lands in order to drastically weaken the opposition's war effort. This war was total in the sense that civilians on both sides participated in the war effort to a significant extent and the armies on both sides waged war against both the civilian population and military forces. Contemporary accounts describe the amount of desolation which befell rural areas as a result of the conflict.

In every area which they captured, the Taiping immediately exterminated the entire Manchu population. In the province of Hunan, one Qing loyalist who observed the genocidal massacres which the Taiping forces committed against the Manchus wrote that the "pitiful Manchus"—men, women, and children—were executed by the Taiping forces. The Taiping rebels were seen chanting while slaughtering the Manchus in Hefei. After capturing Nanjing, Taiping forces killed about 40,000 Manchu civilians. On October 27, 1853, they crossed the Yellow River in Cangzhou and murdered 10,000 Manchus.

Since the rebellion began in Guangxi, Qing forces allowed no rebels speaking its dialect to surrender. Reportedly in the province of Guangdong, it is written that one million were executed, because after the collapse of the Taiping Heavenly Kingdom, the Qing dynasty launched waves of massacres against the Hakkas, that at their height killed up to 30,000 each day. These policies of mass murder of civilians occurred elsewhere in China, including Anhui and Nanjing. This resulted in a massive civilian flight and death toll with some 600 towns destroyed and other bloody policies resulting.

== Legacy ==
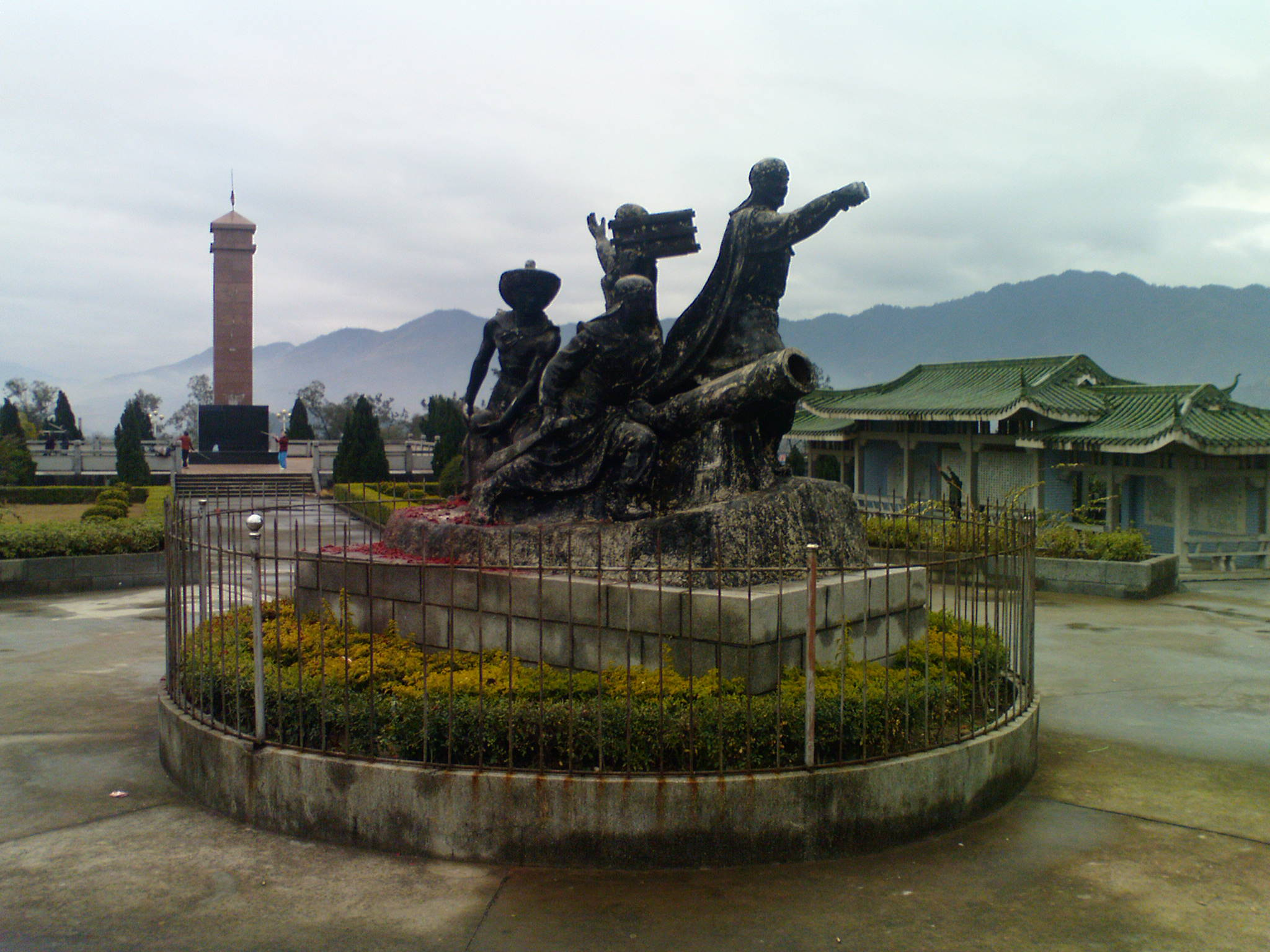
A historic monument to the Taiping Rebellion in Mengshan, Wuzhou, Guangxi, an early seat of the Taiping government

Beyond staggering human and economic devastation, the Taiping Rebellion inflicted profound changes within the late Qing dynasty. The rebels destroyed most of the Manchu quarters—segregated urban garrisons where the Manchu households resided and used to oppress the local Han Chinese—in southern China, severely weakening the control of the Manchu elites over the Han populace in the south. As a result, the Qing court was forced to rely heavily upon local Han gentries to raise Yong Ying militias for law enforcement and suppression of insurgencies, as the traditional Manchu Eight Banners forces and Green Standard Army that the Qing dynasty had long depended upon could no longer suffice. Power became decentralized to a limited extent, and ethnic Han Chinese officials were more widely employed in high positions than they had previously been. Franz H. Michael wrote that these gentry militias later evolved into private armies used by local warlords who dominated China after the fall of the Qing dynasty. Diana Lary, in a review-of-the-field article, cited studies that were skeptical of these claims, since the armies created to put down the Taiping operated in a different context from later regional armies.

The Taiping example of insurgent organization and its mix of Christianity and radical social equality influenced Sun Yat-sen and other future revolutionaries. Some Taiping veterans joined the Revive China Society, whose Christian members organized short-lived Heavenly Kingdom of the Great Mingshun in 1903. Although Karl Marx wrote several articles about the Taipings, he did not perceive a social program or agenda for change, only violence and destruction. Chinese Communist historians, following the lead of Mao Zedong, characterized the rebellion as a proto-communist uprising. Both Communist and Nationalist commanders studied Taiping organization and strategy during the Chinese Civil War. American General Joseph Stilwell, who commanded Chinese troops during the Second Sino-Japanese War, praised Zeng Guofan's campaigns for combining "caution with daring" and "initiative with perseverance."

Famine, disease, massacres, and social disruption led to a sharp decline in population, especially in the Yangtze Delta. The result was a shortage in labor supply for the first time in centuries, making labor relatively more valuable than land. The Xiang Army used scorched earth tactics, refusing to take prisoners. Anhui, Southern Jiangsu, Northern Zhejiang, and Northern Jiangxi were severely depopulated and had to be repopulated with migrants from Henan. The landed gentry of the Lower Yangtze region were reduced in numbers and concentration of land ownership was reduced.

The defeat of the Taiping Rebellion by military forces from Hunan led to the dramatic increase of Hunanese representation in the government, who played a role in reform efforts. By 1865, five of the eight viceroys were Hunanese. The Hunanese gentry, based on their experience with the Taiping, were more guarded against the influence of Westerners than other provinces.

Merchants in Shanxi and the Huizhou region of Anhui became less prominent because the rebellion disrupted trade in much of the country. Trade in coastal regions, especially in Guangzhou and Ningbo was less affected by violence than trade in inland areas was. Streams of refugees who entered Shanghai contributed to the economic development of the city, which was previously less commercially relevant than other cities in the area were. Only a tenth of Taiping-published records survive to this day because they were mostly destroyed by the Qing in an attempt to rewrite the history of the conflict.

Historian John King Fairbank compares the Taiping rebels with the communists under Mao Zedong who came to power a century later:

In addition to the zeal, vigor, and puritanical discipline so often found in new political movements, they shared certain traditional Chinese interests, such as propagating and maintaining doctrinal orthodoxy, recruiting an elite of talent, realizing a utopian social order, and developing military power based on farmer-soldiers. Furthermore, both made use of foreign ideologies which required translation into Chinese with inevitable modifications in the process.

== In popular culture ==
The Taiping Rebellion has been treated in historical novels. Robert Elegant's 1983 Mandarin depicts the time from the point of view of a Jewish family living in Shanghai. In Flashman and the Dragon, the fictional Harry Paget Flashman recounts his adventures during the Second Opium War and the Taiping Rebellion. In Lisa See's novel Snow Flower and the Secret Fan the title character is married to a man who lives in Jintian and the characters get caught up in the action.

Amy Tan's The Hundred Secret Senses takes place in part during the time of the Taiping Rebellion. Rebels of the Heavenly Kingdom by Katherine Paterson is a young adult novel set during the Taiping Rebellion. Li Bo's Tienkuo: The Heavenly Kingdom takes place within the Taiping capital at Nanjing.

The war has been depicted in a few television shows and films. In 1988, a 45-episode drama series about the Taiping Rebellion called Twilight of a Nation was produced in Hong Kong by TVB. In 2000, China Central Television produced The Taiping Heavenly Kingdom, a 46-episode series about the Taiping Rebellion. The Warlords is a 2007 historical film set in the 1860s showing Gen. Pang Qinyun, leader of the Shan Regiment, as responsible for the capture of Suzhou and Nanjing.

== See also ==
- Boxer Rebellion
- Cannibalism in Asia § Ming and Qing dynasties
- Miao Rebellion (1854–1873), uprising of ethnic Miao and other groups in Guizhou province during the reign of the Qing dynasty.
- Nian Rebellion, insurrection against the Qing dynasty in northern China from 1851 to 1868
- Punti–Hakka Clan Wars, conflict between the Hakka and the Cantonese people in Guangdong, China between 1855 and 1867
- Shengbao, the currency of the Taiping Heavenly Kingdom
- Taqibu

General:

- Christianity in China
- Millenarianism in colonial societies
- List of revolutions and rebellions
- List of wars by death toll
