= Yang Xiuqing =

19th-century Chinese military leader; commander-in-chief of the Taiping Rebellion

Yang Xiuqing 楊秀清
- East King (東王)
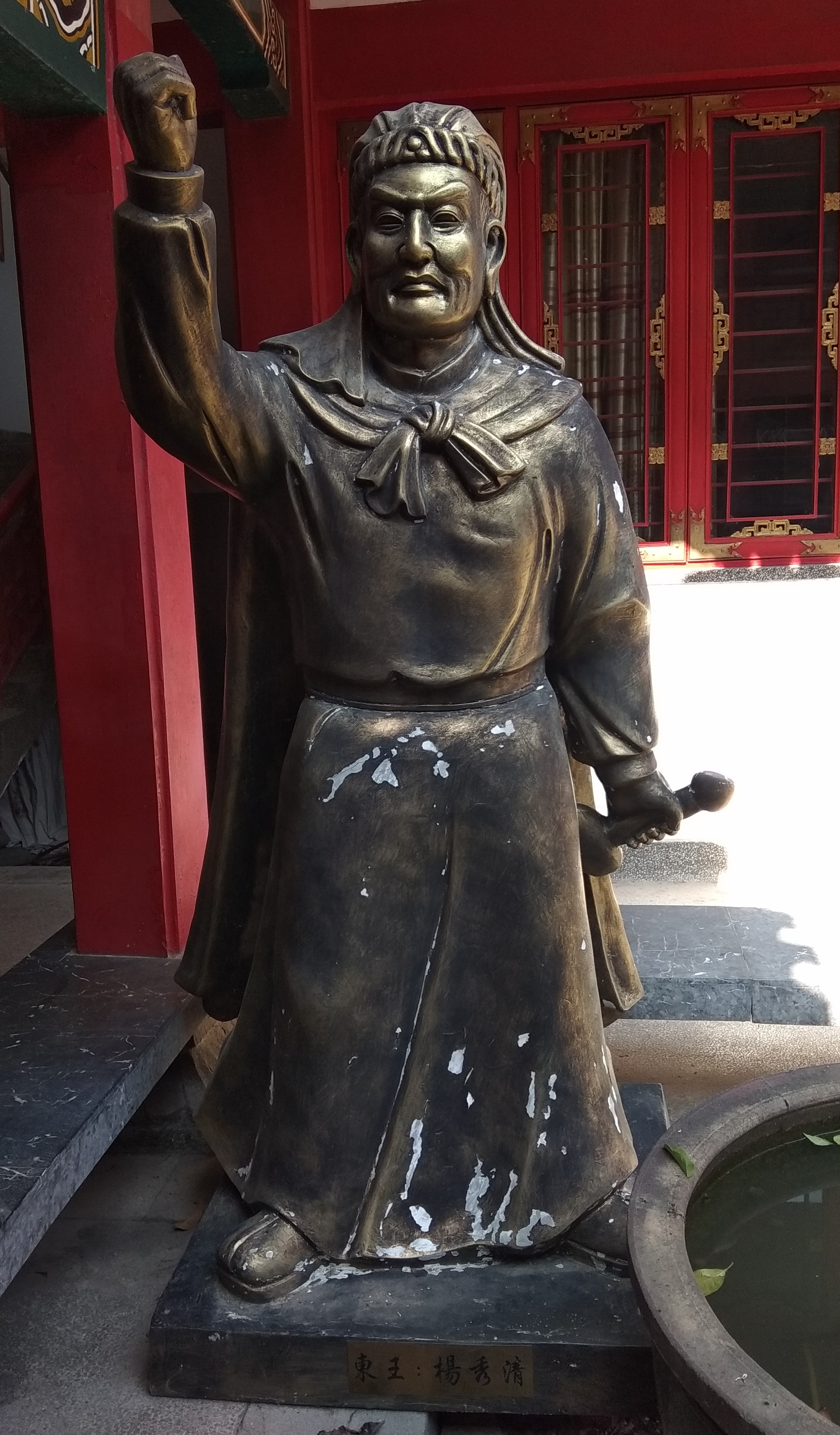

East King of the Heavenly Kingdom
- Reign: 1851–1856
- Successor: Hong Tianyou
- Heavenly King: Hong Xiuquan
- Born: Yang Silong (楊嗣龍); September 23, 1821; Xincun, Guiping, Guangxi, Qing China
- Died: September 2, 1856 (aged 34); Tianjing, Taiping Heavenly Kingdom (modern Nanjing, Jiangsu, China)
Regnal name
- 真天命太平天囯傳天父上主皇上帝真神真聖旨勸慰師聖神上帝之風雷禾乃師贖病主左輔正軍師後師殿中軍兼右軍東王九千歲
- Father: Yang Yaqi (楊亞齊)
- Mother: Gu Shi (古氏)
- Religion: God Worshipping Society
- Military career
- Allegiance: Taiping Heavenly Kingdom
- Conflicts: Taiping Rebellion: Battle of Nanjing (1853); Tianjing incident

Chinese name
- Traditional Chinese: 楊秀清
- Simplified Chinese: 杨秀清
Transcriptions
Standard Mandarin
- Hanyu Pinyin: Yáng Xiùqīng
- Wade–Giles: Yang^{2} Hsiu^{4}-Ch'ing^{1}
Wu
- Wugniu: Yan^{6} Shieu^{5}-chin^{1}
Hakka
- Pha̍k-fa-sṳ: Yòng Siu-chhîn
Yue: Cantonese
- Jyutping: Joeng^{4} Sau^{3}-cing^{1}

Yang Xiuqing (simplified Chinese: 杨秀清; traditional Chinese: 楊秀清; 1821-1856), was an organizer and commander-in-chief of the Taiping Rebellion.

== Early life ==
Yang Xiuqing's family were farmers from Xincun near Jintian, Guangxi, His father died when he was five, and his mother died when he was nine. Raised by his uncle, he was unable to attend school and remained illiterate. He made a living by farming, logging, and charcoal burning. According to imperial reports, Yang was a charcoal burner who later organized a convoy system used to protect from bandits merchandise that was being transported through the area. His brother Yang Fuqing also later became a Taiping military commander.

== Society of God-Worshippers ==
In April 1848, while Feng Yunshan and Hong Xiuquan were in a neighboring province, Yang assumed a leadership role in the God-Worshipping Society. Yang claimed to have been stricken deaf and mute only to have regained his hearing and speech at a meeting of the God Worshippers. He began to claim that he could enter trances in which he claimed "the Heavenly Father Descending to Earth" (God possessing him), allowing God the Father to speak through him. This became a major source of Yang Xiuqing's authority. Hong Xiuquan, who denied the Trinity, acknowledged Yang Xiuqing's position as a spokesperson for the Heavenly Father, and bestowed upon Yang Xiuqing the title Holy Spirit Wind, addressed as "Comforter." Hong Xiuquan believed that "Holy Spirit Wind" is like the Rain Master and Fengbo of China, an ordinary deity in charge of the weather. It does not appear that Yang truly believed that this was occurring, but that he instead acted as such in service of his own ambitions, as while speaking as God Feng necessarily possessed greater authority than even Hong Xiuquan. Upon Hong and Feng's return in the summer of 1849, they investigated Yang's claims and recognized them as genuine. From May to November 1850, Yang once again claimed to be deaf and mute. Once he recovered, Yang alleged that God was angered that Hong Xiuquan was not being allowed to establish the kingdom of God on Earth and sought to punish mankind with disease. According to this tale, only by suffering his illness was Yang able to redeem others. In 1850, perhaps in service of his political ambitions, he began to claim that he could miraculously heal true believers.

== Taiping Rebellion ==
He was an early participant in the rebellion and rose quickly to prominence; in 1851, when Hong Xiuquan took the title of Heavenly King for himself, he made Yang, in spite of having no military knowledge or experience, commander-in-chief of the army. Yang was further named "East King" as one of the five kings. In 1851, Yang announced a vision in which it was revealed that there were traitors in the highest levels of the movement, and two years later that words of the Eastern King, that is, Yang himself, were divine. He devised an extensive network of spies to root out the intrigues of loyalists in the kingdom. Shrewd, ruthless, and ambitious, Yang ultimately proved himself to be a brilliant strategist and organizer, as well as the administrative mastermind of the Taiping Movement. By the 1850s, Yang had become the most powerful leader of the Taiping Rebellion.

With this presumed divine guidance, Taiping troops captured the city of Nanjing (Nanking), which became the capital of the Heavenly Kingdom in 1853. Yang took control of the city. He disciplined the troops after an initial period of violence and slaughter by declaring that he would execute any officer who entered a private home. City residents were ordered to return to work. Men and women were required to live separately, and were prohibited from walking together or even speaking to each other (there continued to be male and female military units). As Hong, the Heavenly King, became less interested in politics and more interested in his harem, he named Yang as prime minister of the Heavenly Kingdom. Many of the basic laws and regulations were issued during this period of Yang's control.

In August 1856, Yang defeated the government troops besieging Nanking. He first led them to divide their forces by forcing them to send relief forces to other cities, then sent all his own troops against them in a massed attack. Arrogance over victory, however, led to his downfall. Yang clashed with Hong over the rebellion's policies and views toward Confucianism and iconoclasm; Yang believed that Confucian morality was essentially positive, and that its basic tenets were compatible with the rebellion's interpretation of Christianity. Hong, however, rejected this notion and believed that Confucianism ought to be eradicated, considering that the belief system is irredeemable after centuries of corruption by the Manchus, used to oppress the Han majority.

== Fall ==
Yang plotted to take the throne. Shortly before seeking a title equivalent to Hong Xiuquan's, Yang dispatched Wei Changhui, Shi Dakai, and Qin Rigang to separate provinces. Hong, viewing Yang's request as treasonous, alerted the three generals to return at once. Meanwhile, Yang demanded to be called Wansui (Ten Thousand Years), a title reserved for the emperor (Hong had assumed it in 1852). Wei returned to Nanjing with three thousand troops on September 1, 1856, and found that Qin Rigang had already arrived. In consultation with Hong Xiuquan and his allies, the two generals decided not to wait for Shi Dakai's arrival. Instead, they and their troops immediately stormed Yang's palace and slew him before he could escape. They then slaughtered his family and followers within the palace, despite having agreed with Hong that only Yang was to die. At this point, six thousand of Yang's followers remained in Nanjing. Yang's remaining followers in the capital were all systemically slaughtered over the next three months. Within a few years, the fortunes of the Taiping Rebellion declined as the rebellion's leaders became involved in the ensuing conspiracies and intrigues.

== Further references ==
- Teng, Ssu-yu (1943). "Yang Hsiu-ch'ing" . In Hummel, Arthur W. Sr. (ed.). Eminent Chinese of the Ch'ing Period. Vol. II. United States Government Printing Office. pp. 886–888.
