= Chinese civil wars =

Civil wars occurred throughout the history of present-day China. The following examples are:

== Historic conflicts and periods of conflict ==
Civil wars in ancient China always created dramatic disasters and usually the change of ruling house. Civil wars often occurred when people went intolerate with the central government, and often caused the fall of the empire and long time division of China with frequent conflicts.

- Spring and Autumn period and the Warring States period
- Chen Sheng rebellion and later Chu-Han Contention
- Agrarian revolts during Wang Mang's reign
- Yellow Turban Rebellion and later the Three Kingdoms
  - Partition of Jin
- War of the Eight Princes, later the Sixteen Kingdoms and the Northern and Southern Dynasties
- Anshi Rebellion and later Divisions of Fanzhen
- Huang Chao Rebellion and later Five Dynasties & Ten Kingdoms
- Jingnan Campaign
- Li Zicheng revolt
- Zhang Xianzhong rebellion and later the transition from Ming to Qing

== Modern conflicts ==
- Taiping Rebellion (1850–1864) between the Qing Dynasty and the Taiping Heavenly Kingdom
- Xinhai Revolution (1911–1912) between the Qing Dynasty and the Tongmenghui
- Second Revolution (1913) between Yuan Shikai's republican government in Beijing and seven southern provinces
- National Protection War (1915–16) between the Hongxian Emperor and Yunnan general Cai E
- Warlord Era (1916–28):
  - Constitutional Protection Movement (1917–18) between the Beiyang government and Sun Yat-sen
  - Zhili–Anhui War (1920)
  - Guangdong–Guangxi War (1920–21)
  - First Zhili–Fengtian War (1922)
  - Second Zhili–Fengtian War (1924)
  - Yunnan–Guangxi War (1925)
  - Anti-Fengtian War (1925–26)
  - Northern Expedition (1925–1928)
- Chinese Civil War, whose two phases—1927–37 and 1946–49—were divided by the Second Sino–Japanese War of World War II
  - Central Plains War (1930)
  - Fujian Rebellion (1933–34)
- 1959 Tibetan uprising (1959)
- Violent Struggle (1966–1968)
- Cultural Revolution (1966-1976)
- Xinjiang conflict (1933–present)

== See also ==
- Chinese Civil War (wargame), a board wargame that simulates the 1946–50 Chinese Civil War
- Chinese Revolution (disambiguation)
- Century of humiliation
- Dissolution of China
- List of wars and battles involving China
- List of rebellions in China
- Taiwan Strait Crises
