= Ren Zhu =

- Born: Unknown; Mengcheng, Anhui, Qing Empire
- Died: 19 November 1867; Ganyu, Jiangsu, Qing Empire
- Military career
- Allegiance: Qing Empire (to 1855); Nien Rebellion (to 1867)
- Service years: 1856–1867
- Conflicts: Battle of Sanhe (1858); Battle of Guanzhong (1861)-1863; Battle of Hubei (1864); Battle of Inlon river(1867)

Ren Zhu (Chinese: 任柱; died November 1867), born in Mengcheng Anhui, China was an eminent military leader of the Nien Rebellion who was known during his military tenure as the King of Lu (魯王). He led Nien (捻軍) forces to many military victories. Li Hongzhang praised Ren Zhu's ability to command hundreds of thousands of cavalry. In May 1865, during a campaign against the Qing in Shandong, he shot the Qing general Sengge Rinchen during the Battle of Gaolouzhai, which sent a shock to the Qing Dynasty and resulted in the promotion of field marshal Zeng Guofan to commander of the Huai Army, Li Hongzhang.

In June 1865, he with Lai Wenguang, he commanded the Nien cavalry forces numbering 90,000 in surrounding and attacking the capital of Beijing, which was nearly successful. He died in battle in Ganyu in November 1867, killed by the Qing dynasty general Liu Mingchuan.
