= Zhang Zongyu =

Zhang Zongyu (Chinese: 張宗禹; died 1868) was a commander of the Nian Rebellion. He was the nephew of Nian leader Zhang Lexing who was killed by Qing dynasty forces in battle in 1863. Taking over command after his uncle's death, Qing commander Sengge Rinchen pursued Zhang's forces to the city of Caozhou, Shandong. However Senge Rinchen was killed in early 1865, allowing Nian troops to retreat to northern Anhui. In October 1866 Zhang returned to Shandong with reinforcements, among them former Taiping rebels. At this point the Nian army became a full-name army.

The Nian domains were split into the Eastern Nian, led by former Taiping King Lai Wenguang and Western Nian, led by Zhang Zongyu.

After the surrender and death of Lai, Western Nian moved into Shanxi and southern Zhili, advancing as far as the edge of Tianjin. Qing General Zuo Zongtang led a blockade that trapped the Western Nian between the Tuxie and Yellow Rivers and the Grand Canal. On August 16, 1868, Zhang Zongyu committed suicide by drowning himself in a river in Shandong.
