= Battle of Guanzhong (1861) =

1861–64 part of the Taiping Rebellion

Date	October 1861 – February 1864
Location	Whole Guanzhong
Result	Qing Dynasty lost Hanzhong and Guanzhong's many cities. Taiping forces (250,000 soldiers) withdrew because Hong Xiuquan ordered them back to aid Nanjing
Territorial changes	Northwestern China and Hanzhong Taiping army liberated central part of Shaanxi

Belligerents
Qing Dynasty	Taiping Heavenly Kingdom

Commanders and leaders
Viceroy Guan Wen; Gov. Liu Rong Capt.-Gen. Dor lonare †	Cmdr. Chen Decai Vice Cmdr. Lai Wenguang; Gen. Qiu Yuancai; Gen. Lan Chengchun; Liang Chengfu Cmdr. Zhang Zongyu

Strength
200,000 Green Standard Army, 50,000 Xiang Army	180,000 Taipings, series wins to supply over 250,000 troops

Casualties and losses
Unknown; Capt. Gen. Dor lonare was Killed in action	Unknown;

The Battle of Guanzhong (Chinese: 關中攻防戰) occurred during the Taiping Revolution that took place in October 1861. When Taiping's Western Army was defeated at Wuhan, they lost their connection with their capital of Nanjing. Former Western Army Commander Chen Yucheng then decided to resupply at Guanzhong. Some of their soldiers were troops who once fought for the Nian Rebellion, so Yucheng decided not to provide them with supplies, as he was uncertain of their loyalty.

== Background ==
On August 22 the Xianfeng Emperor of the Qing Dynasty died at age 30. Gen. Guan Wen ordered the stationary Green Standard Army, consisting of 500,000 men, to move to Eastern Henan to guard the capital at Beijing.

However, the campaign began to look like an ambush to Chen. His uncle Chen Decai did not obey Chen's orders. In November Chen Decai directed an offensive in southern and western Henan that he easily won. The attack created a long front for the Taiping Western Army. At the time Chen Yucheng commanded only the remaining 50,000 of the Taiping Western Army and guarded its tail, but was surrounded by the 150,000-strong Qing army in Hefei.

When Chen Decai discovered it had been a trick he went back to save Chen Yucheng, but was too late. Chen Yucheng and his entire force were destroyed in May 1862.

== Battle of Anqing ==
The Battle of Anqing was intense and ended on September 5. Its loss cost the Western Army 90,000 men and severely affected their morale.

Chen Yucheng believed that they could recover Anqing in a short time, but his generals disagreed.

=== Death of Hu Linyi ===
News of the death of the Xianfeng Emperor encouraged the Governor of Hubei, Hu Linyi, to attempt the recovery of Anqing for Qing. However, he died on September 30. This was good news for Chen Yucheng, because Hu Linyi was the most formidable of his enemies.

=== Fatigue ===
An important factor in the actions of the Western Army was their own fatigue after so many years of fighting. A series of defeats damaged troop morale, and so an escape from the fighting was desired. However, the supply of soldiers and food could have just been an excuse by Chen Yucheng.

== Taiping's third and last western offensive ==
The Taiping army had been raised three times in large-scale western offensives. The first was in Hunan and Hubei in 1853, led by Qin Rigang, Shi Dakai and Lai Hanying, with an army of over 300,000. The second offensive took place in Wuhan in 1855, led by Wei Jun, Chen Yucheng and Yang Fuqing; this offensive was the largest, with over 700,000 troops. The final was the Battle of Guanzhong in 1861.
