= List of rebellions in China =

This is an incomplete list of some of the rebellions, revolts and revolutions that have occurred in China.

== Xia dynasty ==
- The rebellion of Han Zhuo, a 20-year semi-mythological interregnum of the Xia dynasty, in which Han Zhuo murdered Xiang of Xia and installed himself as ruler until his defeat by Shao Kang and the restoration of the Xia.

== Zhou dynasty ==
- Rebellion of the Three Guards (late 11th century BC) was a three-year rebellion of the Shang and three uncles of King Cheng of Zhou against their nephew and his regent, the Duke of Zhou.
- Compatriots Rebellion (842 BC) was an uprising against King Li of Zhou, ending with the King's exile, establishing the interregnum Gonghe Regency until King Xuan of Zhou took the throne.

== Qin dynasty ==
- The Dazexiang Uprising (simplified Chinese: 大泽乡起义; traditional Chinese: 大澤鄉起義; July – December 209 BC) was the first uprising against Qin rule following the death of Qin Shi Huang. Chen Sheng and Wu Guang were both army officers who were ordered to lead their bands of commoner soldiers north to participate in the defense of Yuyang (漁陽). However, they were stopped halfway in Dazexiang, Qixian (modern Suzhou, Anhui) by a severe rainstorm and flooding. Harsh Qin law stated that anyone who showed up late for a government job would be executed, regardless of the nature of the delay. Chen and Wu realized they could never make it on time, and decided to organize a band that would rebel against the government, and declared they would rather fight than accept execution. They became the center of armed uprisings all over China, and in a few months, their strength congregated to around ten thousand men, composed mostly of discontented peasants. However, on the battlefield, they were no match for the highly professional Qin soldiers, and the uprising was in trouble in less than a year.
- Liu Bang's Insurrection (206 BC) was a popular revolt that overthrew the Qin dynasty and, after a period of contention, crowned Liu Bang the first emperor of the Han dynasty.

== Western Han dynasty ==
- The Rebellion of the Seven States or Kingdoms (simplified Chinese: 七国之乱; traditional Chinese: 七國之亂, 154 BC) was a revolt by members of the Han imperial family against attempts to centralize the government under Emperor Jing.

At the beginning of the Han dynasty, Emperor Gao had made many of his relatives princes of certain sections, about one-third to one-half of the empire. This was an attempt to consolidate Liu family rule over the parts of China that were not ruled directly from the capital under the junxian (郡縣) commandery system. During the reign of Emperor Wen, these princes were still setting their own laws, but they were also casting their own coins (albeit with Emperor Wen's approval) and collecting their own taxes. Many princes were effectively ignoring the imperial government's authority within their own principalities. When Jing became emperor in 157 BC, the rich Principality of Wu was especially domineering. Liu Pi, therefore, started a rebellion. The princes participating were: Liu Pi, the Prince of Wu; Liu Wu, the Prince of Chu; Liu Ang, the Prince of Jiaoxi Xing; Liu Sui (劉遂), the Prince of Zhao; Liu Xiongqu (劉雄渠), the Prince of Jiaodong (roughly modern Qingdao, Shandong); Liu Xian (劉賢), the Prince of Zaichuan (roughly part of modern Weifang, Shandong); and Liu Piguang (劉辟光), the Prince of Jinan (roughly modern Jinan, Shandong)

Two other principalities agreed to join—Qi (modern central Shandong) and Jibei (modern northwestern Shandong)— but neither actually did. Liu Jianglü (劉將閭), the Prince of Qi, changed his mind at the last moment and chose to resist the rebellion forces. Liu Zhi (劉志), the Prince of Jibei, was put under house arrest by the commander of his guards and prevented from joining the rebellion. Three other princes were persuaded to join, but either refused, or did not actually agree to join Liu An (劉安), the Prince of Huainan (roughly modern Lu'an, Anhui).

Other participants included Liu Ci (劉賜), the Prince of Lujiang (roughly modern Chaohu, Anhui), and Liu Bo (劉勃), the Prince of Hengshan (roughly part of modern Lu'an, Anhui). The princes also requested help from the southern independent kingdoms of Donghai (modern Zhejiang) and Minyue (modern Fujian), and the powerful northern Xiongnu. Donghai and Minyue sent troops to participate in the campaign, but Xiongnu, after initially promising to do so as well, did not. The seven princes, as part of their political propaganda, claimed that Chao Cuo was aiming to wipe out the principalities, and that they would be satisfied if Chao were executed.

== Xin dynasty ==
- Lülin (綠林) or Lülin Force (綠林兵) refers, as an umbrella term, to one of the two major agrarian rebellion movements against Wang Mang's Xin dynasty in the modern southern Henan and northern Hubei region who banded together to pool their strengths, and whose collective strength eventually led to the downfall of the Xin dynasty and the establishment of a temporary reinstatement of the Han dynasty under Liu Xuan (Gengshi Emperor). Many Lülin leaders became important members of Gengshi Emperor's government, but infighting and incompetence (both of the emperor and his officials) in governing the empire led to the fall of the regime after only two years, paving the way for the eventual rise for Liu Xiu (Emperor Guangwu). The name Lülin came from the Lülin Mountains (in modern Yichang, Hubei), where the rebels had their stronghold for a while.

In AD 17, Jing Province (modern Hubei, Hunan, and southern Henan) was suffering from a famine that was greatly exacerbated by the corruption and incompetence of Xin officials. The victims of the famine were reduced to consuming wild plants, and even those were in short supply, causing the suffering people to attack each other. Two men named Wang Kuang (王匡) and Wang Feng (王鳳), both from Xinshi (新市, in modern Jingmen, Hubei), became arbiters in some of these disputes, and they became the leaders of the starving people. They were later joined by many others, including Ma Wu (馬武), Wang Chang (王常), and Cheng Dan (成丹). Within a few months, 7,000 to 8,000 men gathered together under their commands. They had their base at Lülin Mountain, and their modus operandi was to attack and pillage villages far from the cities for food. This carried on for several years, during which they grew to tens of thousands in size.

Wang sent messengers issuing pardons in hopes of causing these rebels to disband. Once the messengers returned to the Xin capital Chang'an, some honestly reported that the rebels gathered because the harsh laws made it impossible for them to make a living, and therefore they were forced to rebel. Some, in order to flatter Wang Mang, told him that these were simply evil resistors who needed to be killed, or that this was a temporary phenomenon. Wang listened to those who flattered him and generally relieved those who told the truth from their posts. Wang made no further attempts to pacify the rebels, but instead decided to suppress them by force. In reality, the rebels were forced into rebellion to survive, and they were hoping that eventually, when the famine was over, they could return home to farm. As a result, they never dared to attack cities.

In AD 21, the governor of Jing Province mobilized 20,000 soldiers to attack the Lülin rebels, and a battle was fought at Yundu (雲杜), a major victory for the rebels, who killed thousands of government soldiers and captured their food supply and arms. When the governor tried to retreat, his route was temporarily cut off by Ma Wu who allowed him to escape, not wanting to offend the government more than the rebels had done already. Instead, the Lülin rebels roved near the area, capturing many women, and then returning to the Lülin Mountain. By this point, they had 50,000 men.

- Chimei (赤眉) refers, as an umbrella term, to one of the two major agrarian rebellion movements against Wang Mang's Xin dynasty, initially active in the modern Shandong and northern Jiangsu region, that eventually led to Wang Mang's downfall by draining his resources, allowing the leader of the other movement (the Lülin), Liu Xuan (Gengshi Emperor) to overthrow Wang and temporarily establish an incarnation of the Han dynasty under him. Eventually, Chimei forces overthrew Gengshi Emperor and placed their own puppet emperor, Liu Penzi, on the throne briefly, before the Chimei leaders' incompetence in ruling the territories under their control, which matched their brilliance on the battlefield, caused the people to rebel against them, forcing them to try to withdraw home. When their path was blocked by Liu Xiu (Emperor Guangwu)'s newly established Eastern Han regime, they surrendered to him.

Circa AD 17, due to Wang Mang's incompetence in ruling—particularly in the implementation of his land reform policy—and a major Yellow River flood affecting modern Shandong and northern Jiangsu regions, the people, who could no longer subsist on farming, were forced into rebellion to try to survive. The rebellions were numerous and fractured.

== Eastern Han dynasty ==
- The Yellow Turban Rebellion or Yellow Scarves Rebellion (simplified Chinese: 黄巾之乱; traditional Chinese: 黃巾之亂; pinyin: Huángjīnzhī Luàn; AD 184) was a peasant rebellion against Emperor Ling. It is named for the scarves the rebels wrapped around their heads. They were associated with secret Taoist societies, and the rebellion marked an important point in the history of Taoism. The rebellion is the opening event in the historical novel Romance of the Three Kingdoms by Luo Guanzhong.

A major cause of the Yellow Turban Rebellion was an agrarian crisis where famine forced many farmers and former military settlers in the north to seek employment in the south, whose large landowners took advantage of the labor surplus and amassed large fortunes. The situation was further aggravated by smaller floods along the lower course of the Yellow River. Further pressure was added on the peasants by high taxes imposed on them in order to build fortifications along the Silk Road, and garrisons against foreign infiltrations and invasions. From AD 170 on, landlords and peasants formed irregular armed bands, setting the stage for class conflict.

At the same time, the Han dynasty showed internal weakness. The power of the landowners had been a problem for a long time already (see Wang Mang), but in the run-up to the Yellow Turban Rebellion, the court eunuchs, in particular, gained considerable influence over the emperor, which they abused to enrich themselves. Ten of the most powerful eunuchs formed a group known as the Ten Regular Attendants and the emperor referred to one of them, Zhang Rang, as his "foster father." Consequently, the government was widely regarded as corrupt and incapable. Against this backdrop, the famines and floods were seen as an indication that a decadent emperor had lost his mandate of heaven.

The Yellow Turban Rebellion was led by Zhang Jiao (or Zhang Jue) and his two younger brothers Zhang Bao and Zhang Liang, who were born in Julu District, Ye Prefecture. The brothers had founded a Taoist religious sect in Shandong Province. They considered themselves followers of the "Way of Supreme Peace" and venerated the deity Huang-Lao, who according to Zhang Jiao had given him a sacred book called the Crucial Keys to the Way of Peace (Tai Ping Yao Shu). Zhang Jiao was said to be a sorcerer and styled himself as the Great Teacher. The sect propagated the principles of equal rights of all peoples and equal distribution of land; when the rebellion was proclaimed, the sixteen-word slogan was created by Zhang Jiao: 苍天已死，黄天当立，岁在甲子，天下大吉 ("The Blue Sky (ie. the Han dynasty) has perished, the Yellow Sky (ie. the rebellion) will soon rise; in this year of Jia Zi, let there be prosperity in the world!")

- The Five Pecks of Rice Rebellion (AD 184) was a religious rebellion instigated by Zhang Lu, the grandson of the Taoist leader Zhang Daoling. The name of the rebellion derives from the name of his movement, the Way of the Five Pecks of Rice (Chinese: 五斗米道; pinyin: Wǔdǒumǐdào), in turn, named for the amount of rice paid as dues or for cures.

Early in the 2nd century AD, Zhang Daoling used his popularity as a faith healer and religious leader to organize a theological movement against the Han dynasty from the widespread poverty and corruption that oppressed the peasants under its rule. He gathered many followers from the Sichuan area by not only providing a source of hope for the disparaged, but also by reforming religious practices into a more acceptable format. This created one of the first organized religious movements in China.

In AD 184, the successor of his son Zhang Heng, his grandson Zhang Lu, revolted against the Han dynasty and created his own state, Zhang Han. This state continued for over 30 years until Zhang Lu's defeat and surrender to the general Cao Cao. After Zhang Lu's surrender, he relocated to the Han court where he continued to live until the Han dynasty was replaced by the Cao Wei regime. Zhang Lu then used his own popularity as a religious leader to lend legitimacy to the new Wei court, proclaiming that the Wei court had inherited divine authority from the Tao church, as well as from Confucian laws.

== Three Kingdoms (220 - 280) ==
=== Eastern Wu ===
- In 248, the people of Jiaozhi and Jiuzhen districts of Jiaozhou province rebelled against the Wu Chinese. A local woman named Triệu Ẩu in Jiuzhen led the rebellion, followed by a hundred chieftains led fifty thousand families in her revolt. The uprising of Lady Triệu is usually depicted in modern Vietnamese National History as one of many chapters constituting a "long national independence struggle to end foreign domination."

== Eastern Jin dynasty ==
- The Sun En Rebellion (c. 399 – c. 403) was a rebellion led by Sun En, the nephew of an executed southern Taoist leader. The rebels planned to flee to Penglai Island after their success and the campaign was notable for its major naval battles and the government's dependence on Liu Laozhi, a general risen from among common stock. Their discarded rafts are sometimes credited with the early formation of Chongming Island in northern Shanghai.

== Tang dynasty ==
- The An Shi Rebellion (Chinese: 安史之亂; pinyin: Ānshǐzhī Luàn; 756–763) was a rebellion by An Lushan and Shi Siming against the Tang dynasty. It was also known as the Tianbao Rebellion (Chinese: 天寶之亂; pinyin: Tiānbǎozhī Luàn) from the name of the Chinese era during which it began.

The rebellion spanned the reigns of three emperors. The first, Emperor Xuanzong, escaped to Sichuan. Along the way, his soldiers demanded the death of an official, Yang Guozhong, and his cousin, Consort Yang. Emperor Suzong, a son of Emperor Xuanzong, was proclaimed emperor by the Tang army and eunuchs, while another group of local officials and Confucian literati proclaimed another prince as the new emperor in Jinling (present-day Nanjing).

It was begun by An Lushan in the 14th year of Tianbao but, after the assassination of his son An Qingxu, the revolt was led by his former subordinate Shi Siming. The rebellion was suppressed during the reign of Emperor Daizong by generals Pugu Huai'en, Guo Ziyi and Li Guangbi. Although successful at suppressing the rebellion, the Tang dynasty was badly weakened by it, and in its remaining years was troubled by persistent warlordism.

- The Huang Chao Rebellion (Chinese: 黄巢起义 or (Chinese: 黄巢之乱; 875 - 884) was a rebellion by Huang Chao.

== Yuan dynasty ==
- The Red Turban Rebellion (Chinese: 紅巾起義; pinyin: Hóngjīn Qǐyì) was an uprising against the Mongol-led Yuan dynasty. Since the 1340s, the Yuan dynasty was experiencing problems. The Yellow River flooded constantly, and other natural disasters also occurred. At the same time, the Yuan government required considerable military expenditure to maintain its vast empire. This was solved mostly through additional taxation that fell mainly on the Han Chinese population which constituted the lowest two of the four castes of people under Yuan rule — much influenced by the White Lotus Society members that targeted the ruling Yuan government.

== Ming dynasty ==
- Li Zicheng's rebellion was a peasant rebellion aimed at the overthrow of the Ming dynasty; it led to the establishment of the Manchu-led Qing dynasty. Li Zicheng began recruiting troops at Xi'an in Shaanxi province, and later went on to gain power throughout northeastern China. From 1620, towards the end of the Wanli Emperor's reign, social and economic conditions under Ming rule worsened drastically. Li Zicheng did not become the emperor, but he paved the way for the rising of the new Qing dynasty, after overthrowing the Ming emperor by capturing Beijing and declaring the short-lived Shun dynasty. The Qing troops, arriving from the northeast (originally from Manchuria) were allied with Wu Sangui, a former Ming general, an alliance which eventually led to the defeat of Li Zicheng, though the impact of his rebellion was tremendous.
- There were also other peasant rebellions at the time, such as those led by Zhang Xianzhong who ruled Sichuan and declared the short-lived Xi dynasty.
- Nurhaci who established the Later Jin dynasty was often regarded the founding father of the Qing dynasty. He was originally a vassalage to the Ming dynasty and later renounced the Ming overlordship and rebelled against the Ming with the Seven Grievances.

== Qing dynasty ==
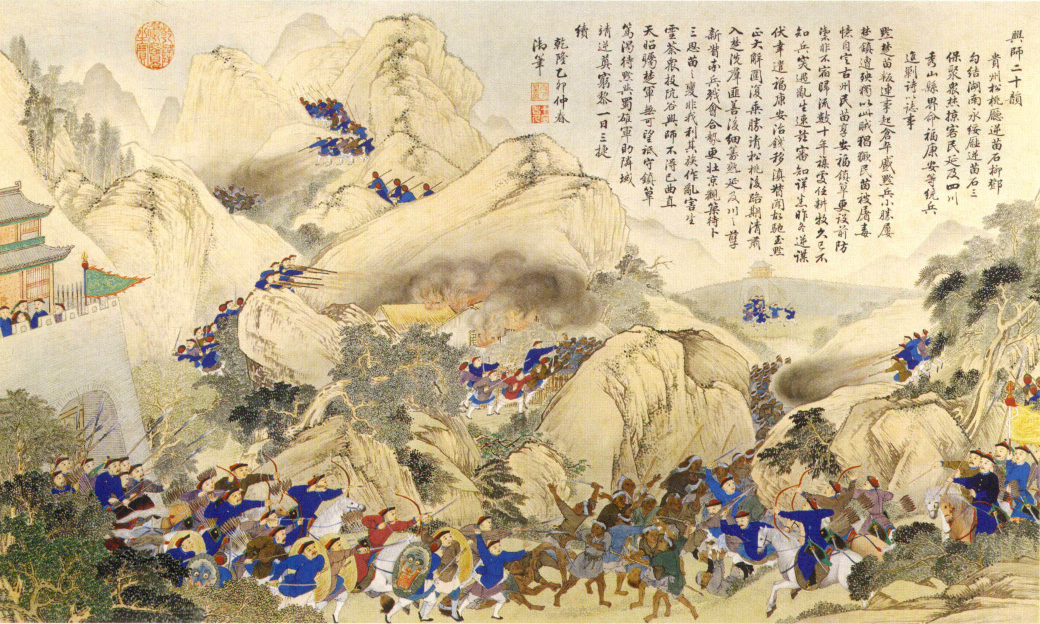
A scene of the campaign against the Miao people in 1795

=== Revolt of the Three Feudatories ===
The Revolt of the Three Feudatories was led by three territories (Chinese: 三藩; pinyin: Sānfàn) in southern China bestowed by the early Manchu rulers on three Han Chinese generals — Wu Sangui, Geng Jingzhong, and Shang Zhixin. In the second half of the 17th century, they revolted against the Qing government. This rebellion came as the Qing rulers were establishing themselves after their conquest of China in 1644 and was the last serious threat to their imperium until the 19th-century conflicts that ultimately brought about the end of the dynasty in 1912. The revolt was followed by almost a decade of civil war which extended across the breadth of China.

In 1655, the Qing government granted Wu Sangui, a man to whom they were indebted for the conquest of China, both civil and military authority over the province of Yunnan. In 1662, after the execution of Zhu Youlang, the last claimant to the Ming throne, Wu was also given jurisdiction over Guizhou. In the next decade he consolidated his power, and by 1670 his influence had spread to include much of Hunan, Sichuan, Gansu and even Shaanxi. Two other powerful defected military leaders also developed similar powers: Shang Zhixin in Guangdong and Geng Jingzhong in Fujian. They ruled their feudatories (territories) as their own domains and the Qing government had virtually no control over the provinces in the south and southwest.

By 1672, the Kangxi Emperor had determined that these feudatories were a threat to the Qing regime. In 1673, Shang Zhixin submitted a memorial requesting permission to retire and in August of the same year, a similar request arrived from Wu Sangui, designed to test the court's intentions. The Kangxi Emperor went against the majority view in the Council of Princes and High Officials and accepted the request. News of Wu's rebellion reached Beijing in January 1674.

=== White Lotus Rebellion ===
The White Lotus Rebellion (1796–1804) was an anti-Qing uprising that occurred during the Qing dynasty.

It broke out among impoverished settlers in the mountainous region that separates Sichuan province from Hubei and Shaanxi provinces. It apparently began as a tax protest led by the White Lotus Society, a secret religious society that forecasted the advent of the Buddha Maitreya, advocated the restoration of the Ming dynasty, and promised personal salvation to its followers. At first, the Qing government, under the control of Heshen, sent inadequate and inefficient imperial forces to suppress the ill-organized rebels. On assuming effective power in 1799, however, the Jiaqing Emperor (r. 1796–1820) overthrew Heshen's clique and gave support to the efforts of the more vigorous Qing commanders as a way of restoring discipline and morale. A systematic program of pacification followed in which the populace was resettled in hundreds of stockaded villages and organized into a militia by the name of tuanlian. In its last stage, the Qing suppression policy combined pursuit and extermination of rebel guerrilla bands with a program of amnesty for deserters. Although the Qing finally crushed the rebellion, the myth of the military invincibility of the Manchus was shattered, perhaps contributing to the greater frequency of rebellions in the 19th century.

=== Eight Trigrams uprising of 1813 ===
The Eight Trigrams uprising of 1813 broke out in China under the Qing dynasty. The rebellion was started by some elements of the millenarian Tianli Sect (天理教) or Heavenly Principle Sect, which was a branch of the White Lotus Sect. Led by Lin Qing (林清; 1770–1813) and Li Wencheng, the revolt occurred in the Zhili, Shandong, and Henan provinces of China.

In 1812, the leaders of the Eight Trigram Sect (Bagua jiao) also known as the Sect of Heavenly Order (Tianli jiao) announced that leader Li Wencheng was a 'true lord of the Ming' and declared 1813 as the year for rebellion, while Lin Qing declared himself the reincarnation of Maitreya, the prophesied future Buddha in Buddhism, using banners with the inscription "Entrusted by Heaven to Prepare the Way", a reference to the popular novel Water Margin. They considered him sent by the Eternal Unborn Mother of esoteric Chinese religions, to remove the Qing dynasty whom they regarded as having lost the Mandate of Heaven to rule.

The third leader was Feng Keshan, who was called the "King of Earth", Li titled the "King of Men", and Lin referred to as "King of Heaven".

The group won support from several powerful Eunuchs in the Forbidden City. On 15 September 1813, the group attacked the imperial palace in Beijing. The rebels made it into the city, and may have been successful in overthrowing the Qing had not Prince Mianning—the future emperor—used his forbidden musket to repel the invaders.

The rebellion is seen as being similar to the previous White Lotus Rebellion, with the former being of religious intent and the latter leaders of the Eight Trigram appearing more interested in personal power by overthrowing the Qing dynasty.

=== Taiping Rebellion ===
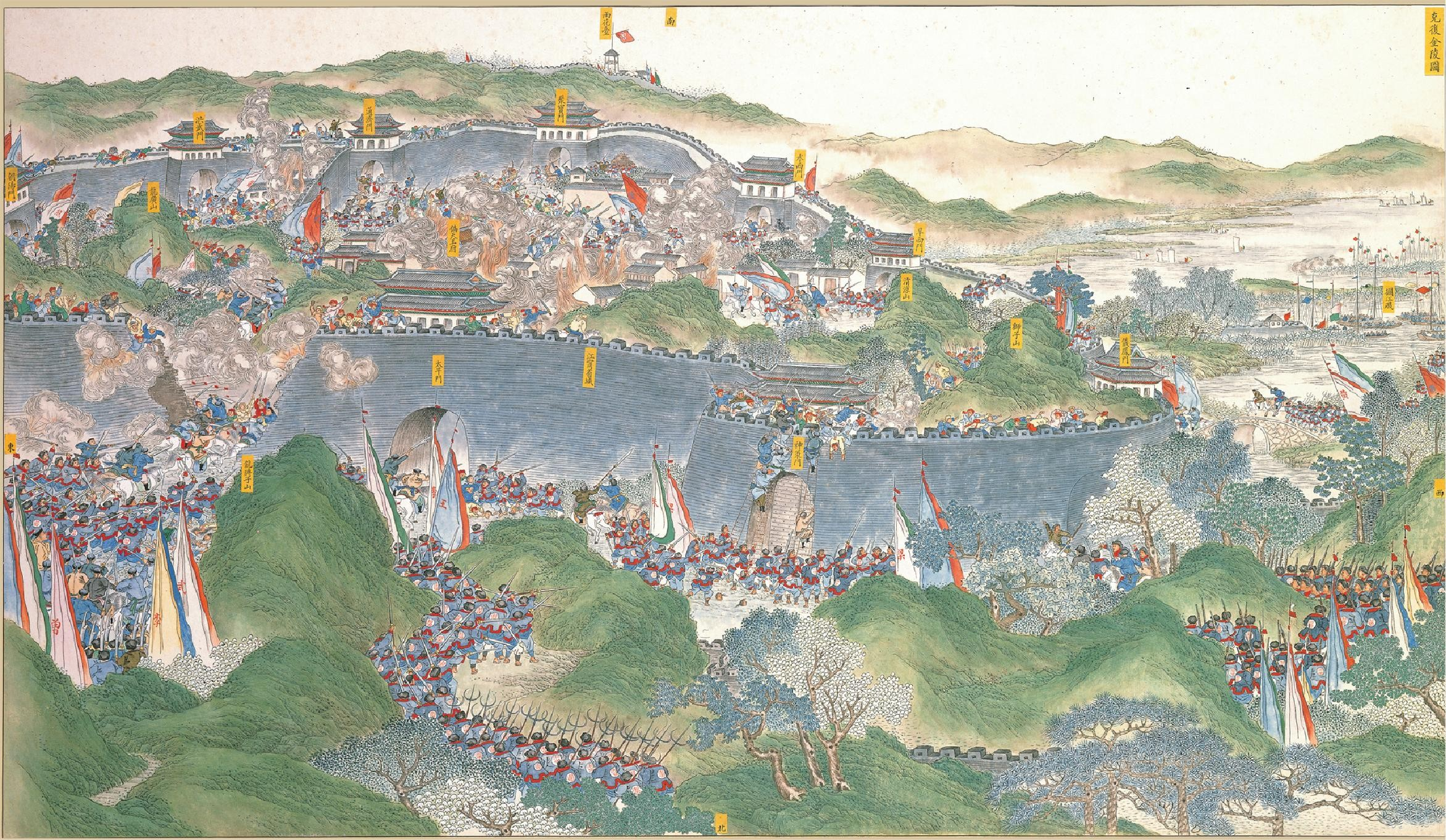
The retaking of Nanjing by Qing troops

The Taiping Rebellion (1850–1864), usually known in Chinese after the name of the Taiping Heavenly Kingdom (simplified Chinese: 太平天国; traditional Chinese: 太平天國; pinyin: Tàipíng Tiānguó) proclaimed by the rebels, was a rebellion in southern China inspired by a Hakka named Hong Xiuquan, who had claimed that he was the brother of Jesus Christ. Most sources put the total deaths at about 20 million, although some claim tolls as high as 50 million. Altogether, some historians have estimated that political insurrections such as the rebellion combined with natural disasters may have cost on the order of 200 million Chinese lives between 1850 and 1865. The figure is unlikely, as it is approximately half the estimated population of China in 1851.

Hong Xiuquan gathered his support in a time of considerable turmoil. The country had suffered a series of natural disasters, economic problems and defeats at the hands of the Western powers, problems that the ruling Qing dynasty did little to lessen. Anti-Qing sentiment was strongest in the south, and it was these disaffected that joined Hong. The sect extended into militarism in the 1840s, initially against banditry. The persecution of the sect was the spur for the struggle to develop into guerrilla warfare and then into full-blown war. The revolt began in Guangxi province. In early January 1851, a ten-thousand-strong rebel army routed Qing imperial forces at the town of Jintian in the Jintian Uprising. The Qing forces attacked but were driven back. In August 1851, Hong declared the establishment of the Taiping Heavenly Kingdom with himself as absolute ruler. The revolt spread northwards with great rapidity. 500,000 Taiping soldiers took Nanjing in March 1853, killing 30,000 Qing soldiers and slaughtering thousands of civilians. The city became the movement's capital and was renamed Tianjing (lit. "Heavenly Capital"; not to be confused with Tianjin) until its recapture.

=== Nian Rebellion ===
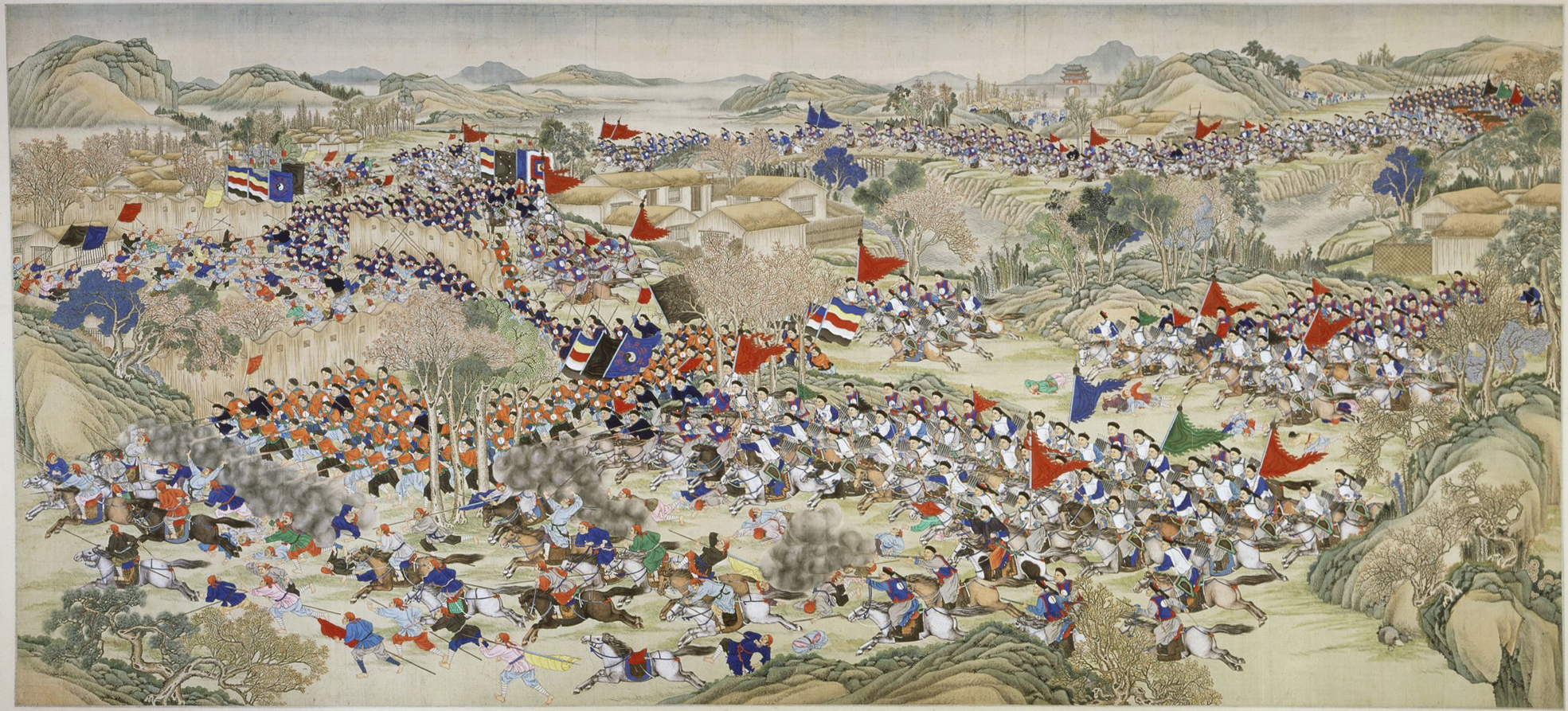
A scene of the Nien Rebellion. Probably represents the Battle of Inlon River, 1867

The Nian Rebellion (simplified Chinese: 捻军起义; traditional Chinese: 捻軍起義; pinyin: Niǎnjūn Qǐyì; 1851–1868) was a large armed uprising that took place in northern China. The rebellion failed to topple the Qing dynasty, but caused immense economic devastation and loss of life that became one of the major long-term factors in the collapse of the Qing regime.

The Nian movement was formed in the late 1840s by Zhang Lexing and, by 1851, numbered approximately 40,000. Unlike the Taiping Rebellion, though, the Nian movement initially had no clear goals or objectives aside from criticism of the Qing government. However, the Nian rebels were provoked into taking direct action against the Qing regime following a series of ecological disasters. In 1851, the Yellow River burst its banks, flooding hundreds of thousands of square miles and causing immense loss of life. The Qing government slowly began cleaning up after the disaster, but were unable to provide effective aid as government finances had been drained during the Opium War with the British, and the ongoing slaughter of the Taiping Rebellion. The damage created by the disaster had still not been repaired when, in 1855, the river burst its banks again, drowning thousands and devastating the fertile province of Jiangsu. At the time, the Qing government was trying to negotiate a deal with the Western powers, and as state finances had been so severely depleted, the regime was unable to provide effective relief aid. This enraged the Nian movement, who blamed the Westerners for contributing to China's troubles, and increasingly viewed the Qing government as incompetent and cowardly in the face of the Western powers.

In 1855, Zhang Lexing took direct action by launching attacks against government troops in central China. By the summer, the fast-moving Nian cavalry, well-trained and fully equipped with modern firearms, had cut the lines of communication between Beijing and the Qing armies fighting the Taiping rebels in the south. Qing forces were badly overstretched as rebellions broke out across China, allowing the Nian armies to conquer large tracts of land and gain control over economically vital areas. The Nian fortified their captured cities and used them as bases to launch cavalry attacks against Qing troops in the countryside, prompting local towns to fortify themselves against Nian raiding parties. This resulted in constant fighting which devastated the previously rich provinces of Jiangsu and Hunan.

In early 1856, the Qing government sent the Mongol general Sengge Rinchen, who had recently crushed a large Taiping rebel army, to defeat the Nian. Sengge Rinchen's army captured several fortified cities and destroyed most of the Nian infantry, and killed Zhang Lexing himself in an ambush. However, the Nian movement survived as Taiping commanders arrived to take control of the Nian forces, and the bulk of the Nian cavalry remained intact. Sengge Rinchen's infantry-based army could not stop the fast moving cavalry from devastating the countryside and launching surprise attacks on Qing troops. In 1865, Sengge Rinchen and his bodyguards were ambushed by Nian troops and killed, depriving the government of its best military commander. The Qing regime sent general Zeng Guofan to take command of Qing imperial forces, providing him with modern artillery and weapons, purchased from the Europeans at extortionate prices. Zeng's army set about building canals and trenches to hem in the Nian cavalry — an effective, but slow and expensive method. Zeng was removed from the post after the Nian rebels broke one of his defense fronts. Generals Li Hongzhang and Zuo Zongtang were put in charge of the suppression. In late 1866, the Nian movement split into two — east Nian stayed in central China and west Nian sneaked close to Beijing. By late 1867, Li and Zuo's troops had recaptured much territory from the Nian rebels, and in early 1868, the movement was crushed by the combined forces of imperial troops and the Ever Victorious Army.

=== Du Wenxiu Rebellion ===
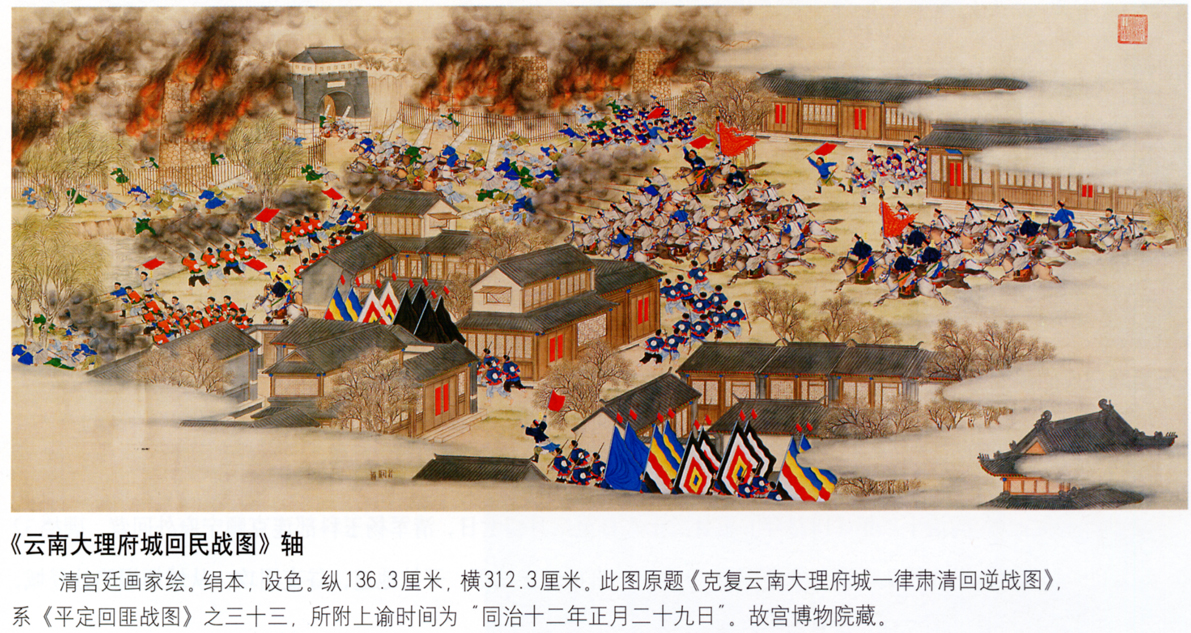
Capture of Dali, the capital of the Pingnan Sultanate in Yunnan, 1873

The Du Wenxiu Rebellion, or Panthay Rebellion (1856–1872) was a separatist movement of Muslim Hui in western Yunnan, led by Du Wenxiu (born Sulayman ibn `Abd ar-Rahman).

Du claimed the title of Qa´id Jami al-Muslimin ("Leader of the Community of Muslims"). He was known in English as the Sultan of Dali upon the city's capture. It became the base for the rebels, who declared themselves "Pingnan" (Chinese: 平南國; lit. 'The Pacified South'). The rebels besieged the city of Kunming four times (1857, 1861, 1863, and 1868) and briefly held the city during the third attempt. Later, as Qing forces began to gain the upper hand against the rebellion, the rebels sent a letter to Queen Victoria, asking the British for formal recognition and for military assistance; the British demurred. The rebellion was eventually suppressed by Qing troops, who killed and posthumously decapitated Du. The brutal suppression led to many Hui people fleeing to neighboring countries bordering Yunnan. Surviving Huis escaped to Burma, Thailand and Laos, forming the basis of a minority Chinese Hui population in those nations. Hundreds of thousands of Hui people were massacred or died in these purges.

The rebellion had a significant negative impact on the Burmese Konbaung dynasty. After losing lower Burma to the British, Burma lost access to vast tracts of rice-growing land. Not wishing to upset China, the Burmese kingdom agreed to refuse trade with the Hui rebels in accordance with China's demands. Without the ability to import rice from China, Burma was forced to import rice from the British. In addition, the Burmese economy had relied heavily on cotton exports to China, and suddenly lost access to the vast Chinese market.

=== Dungan revolts ===
In the Jahriyya revolt sectarian violence between two suborders of the Naqshbandi Sufis, the Jahriyya Sufi Muslims and their rivals, the Khafiyya Sufi Muslims, led to a Jahriyya Sufi Muslim rebellion which the Qing dynasty in China crushed with the help of the Khafiyya Sufi Muslims.

The First Dungan Revolt or Muslim Rebellion (simplified Chinese: 回变; traditional Chinese: 回變; pinyin: Huíbiàn; 1862–1877), known in China as the Hui Minority War, was an uprising by members of the Muslim Hui community in Shaanxi, Gansu, and Ningxia.

Chinese Muslims had been traveling to West Asia for many years prior to the Hui Minorities' War. Some of them had adopted radical Sufi Islamic teachings referred to as New Teachings. There had been attempted uprisings by followers of these New Teachings in 1781 and 1783. In 1862 the prestige of the Qing dynasty was low and their armies were busy elsewhere. In 1867 the Qing government sent one of their best officials, Zuo Zongtang, a hero of the suppression of the Taiping Rebellion, to Shaanxi. His forces were ordered to help put down the Nian Rebellion, and he was unable to deal with the Muslim rebels until December 1868. Zuo's approach was to rehabilitate the region by promoting agriculture, especially cotton and grain, as well as supporting orthodox Confucian education. Due to the poverty of the region, Zuo had to rely on financial support from outside the North-West. After building up enough grain reserves to feed his army, Zuo attacked the most important Muslim leader, Ma Hualong. Ma was besieged in the city of Jinjibao for sixteen months before surrendering in March 1871. Zuo sentenced Ma and over eighty of his officials to death by slicing. Thousands of Muslims were exiled to different parts of China. Despite repeated offers of amnesty, many Muslims continued to resist until the fall of Suzhou in Gansu. The failure of the uprising in 1873 led to some immigration of Hui people into Russia. The descendants of the immigrants continue to live in the border region of Kazakhstan, Uzbekistan, and Kyrgyzstan.

The Second Dungan Revolt (1895–1896), known in China as the Second Hui Minority War, was a second Muslim revolt against the Qing. They were defeated by loyalist Muslim troops.

=== Boxer Rebellion ===
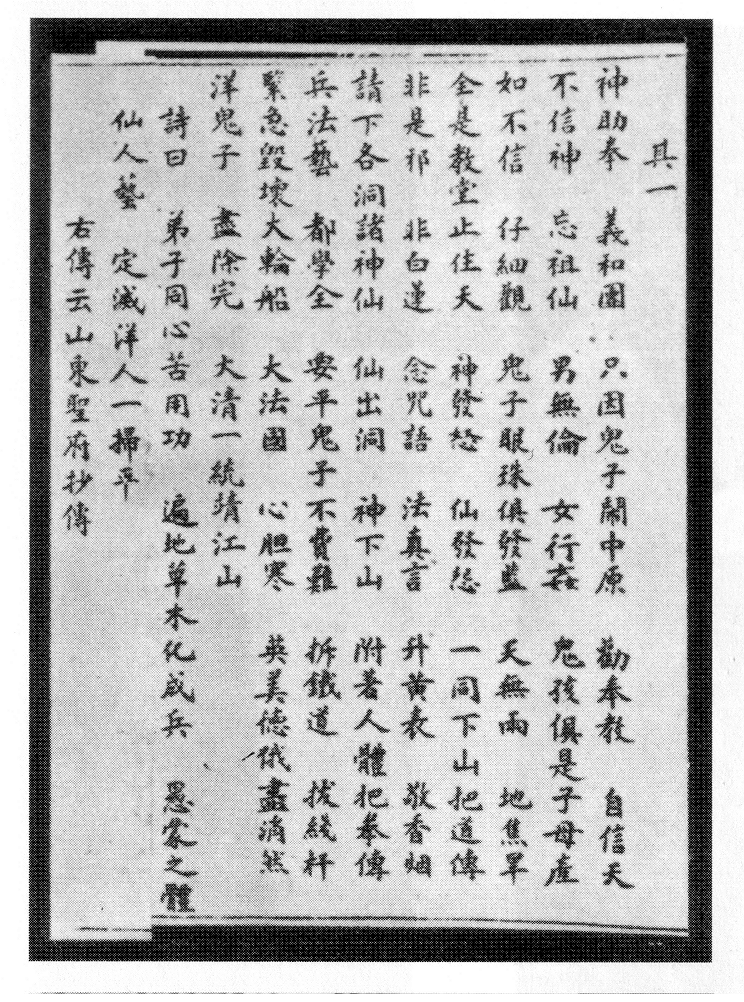
Anti-Foreign pamphlet, c. 1899

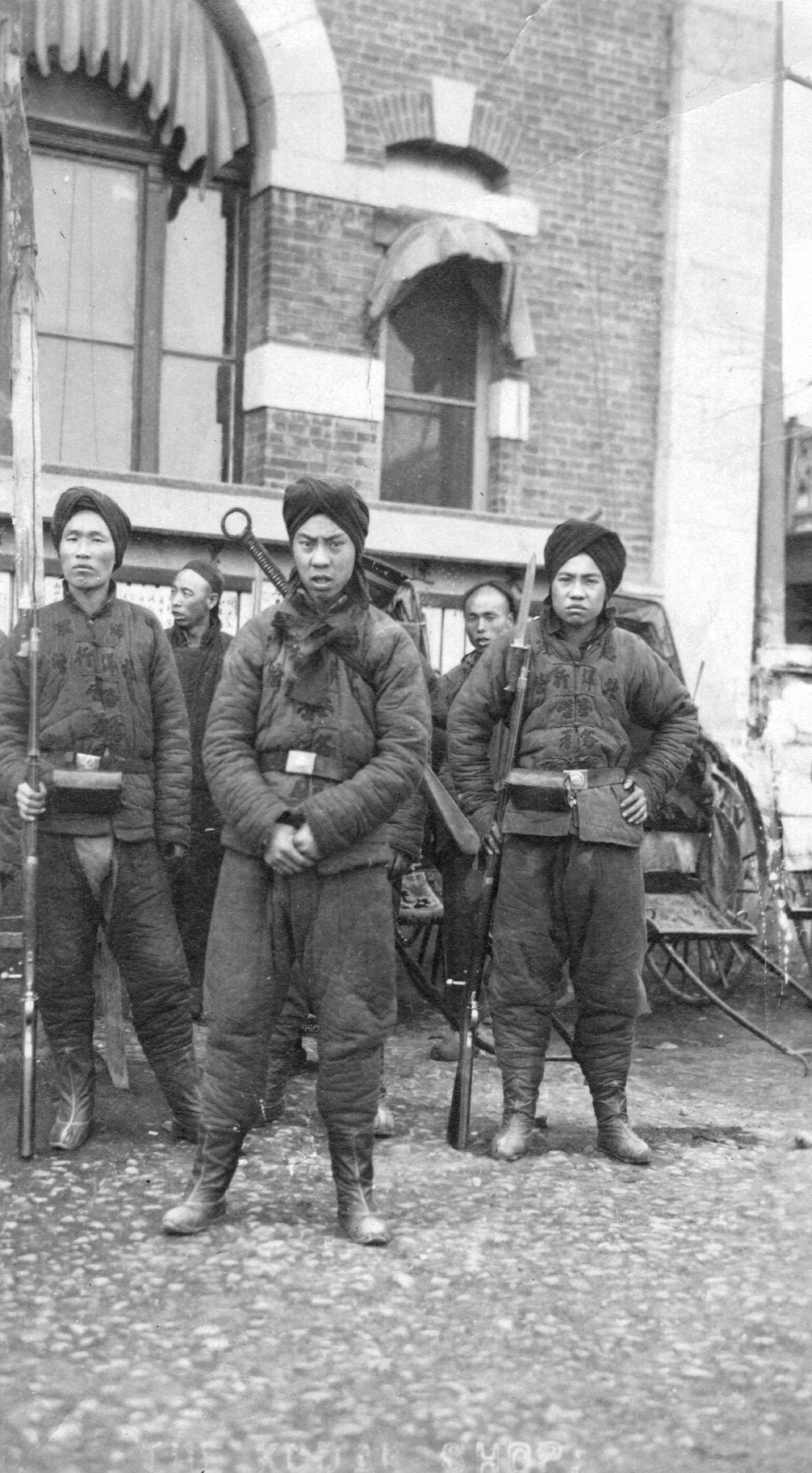
Boxer forces, 1900 photo

The Boxer Rebellion (simplified Chinese: 义和团之乱; traditional Chinese: 義和團之亂) or Uprising (simplified Chinese: 义和团起义; traditional Chinese: 義和團匪亂; pinyin: Yìhétuán Qǐyì; November 1899 –September 7, 1901) was a revolt against European commercial, political, religious, and technological influence in China. By August 1900, over 230 foreigners, thousands of Chinese Christians, an unknown number of rebels and sympathizers and other Chinese were killed in the revolt and its suppression.

In 1840, the First Opium War broke out, and China was defeated by Britain. In view of the weakness of the Qing government, Britain and other nations such as France, Russia and Japan started to exert influence over China. Due to their inferior army and navy, the Qing dynasty was forced to sign many agreements which became known as the Unequal Treaties. These include the Convention of Chuenpi (1841), Treaty of Nanking (1842), the Treaty of Aigun (1858), the Treaty of Tientsin (1858), the Convention of Peking (1860), the Treaty of Shimonoseki (1895), and the Second Convention of Peking (1898).

Such treaties were regarded as grossly unfair by many Chinese, whose prestige was sorely damaged by the treaties, as foreigners were perceived to receive special treatment compared to Chinese. Rumours circulated of foreigners committing crimes as a result of agreements between foreign and the Chinese governments over how foreigners in China should be prosecuted. In Guizhou, local officials were reportedly shocked to see a cardinal using a sedan chair decorated in the same manner as one reserved for the governor. The Catholic Church's prohibition on some Chinese rituals and traditions was another issue of contention. Thus in the late 19th century such feelings increasingly resulted in civil disobedience and violence towards both foreigners and Chinese Christians.

The rebellion was initiated by a society known as the Boxers (Chinese: Righteous Harmony Society), a group which initially opposed—but later reconciled itself to—the Qing dynasty. The Boxer Rebellion was concentrated in northern China where the European powers had begun to demand territorial, rail and mining concessions. Germany responded to the killing of two missionaries in Shandong province in November 1897 by seizing the port of Qingdao. A month later a Russian naval squadron took possession of Lushun, in southern Liaoning. Britain and France followed, taking possession of Weihai and Zhanjiang respectively.

=== Xinhai Revolution ===
The Xinhai Revolution (Chinese: 辛亥革命; pinyin: Xīnhài Gémìng) was a republican revolution which overthrew the Qing dynasty and led to the establishment of the Republic of China. The revolution ended the monarchy which had a history for 4000 years in China and replaced it with a republic, with democratic ideals. The ensuing revolutionary war lasted from October 10, 1911, and ended upon the formation of the Republic of China on February 12, 1912. Since 1911 is a Xinhai Year in the sexagenary cycle of the Chinese calendar, this is how Xinhai Revolution had got its name.

The revolution began with the armed Wuchang Uprising and the spread of republican insurrection through the southern provinces, and culminated in the abdication of the Xuantong Emperor after lengthy negotiations between rival imperial and republican regimes based in Beijing and Nanjing respectively.

The revolution inaugurated a period of struggle over China's eventual constitutional form, which saw two brief monarchical restorations and successive periods of political fragmentation before the Republic's final establishment.

The Xinhai Revolution is commemorated as the National Day of the Republic of China, also known as Double Ten Day (雙十節). Today the National Day is mainly celebrated in Taiwan. In addition, numerous overseas Chinese also celebrate Double Ten Day and events are usually held in Chinatowns across the world.

A plan backed by foreign bankers was reported in place to declare the Duke Yansheng as Emperor of China as a Han emperor, if the revolutionary's republican plan failed.

== Republic of China ==
After Western ideologies came to China during the May Fourth Movement, Li Dazhao and other communists established the Chinese Communist Party in 1921 with the support of the Comintern. Communist Party members are allowed to join the Kuomintang (KMT; Nationalist Party), which, under the leadership of Sun Yat-sen, was seeking an alliance to end the Warlord Era and unify China. As the new leader of the KMT, Chiang Kai-shek, launched the Northern Expedition to unify China in 1924. Conservatives within the KMT in Nanking grew hostile to the communists, while the leftists in Wuhan were in favour of the alliance with them. The first KMT-CCP alliance was broken when communists were arrested and executed in Shanghai in the April 12 Purge. The Communists, under the leadership of Zhou Enlai and Zhu De, rebelled against the National Revolutionary Army at the Nanchang Uprising on 1 August 1927, and consequently established the Chinese Soviet Republic which controlled the self-proclaimed "Soviet Area" in Jiangxi. The headquarters of the secessionist republic was recovered by the Nationalist Government in 1934 but the communists evaded the Nationalist Revolutionary Army in the Long March and retreated to Shaanxi.

There was a temporary cease-fire when the second KMT-CCP alliance was formed in 1937 to combat the Japanese invasion. The Chinese Soviet Republic was renamed Shaan-Gan-Ning Border Region, and the communist-led Chinese Workers' and Peasants' Red Army became the New Fourth Army and the Eighth Route Army of the National Revolutionary Army. All these changes were nominal, however, as the CCP expanded in power and its fighting with the government persisted in the course of the war. After the surrender of Japan in 1945, the Communists took over several regions formerly occupied by Japan. Full-scale war broke out amid the adoption of the Constitution of the Republic of China in 1947. By October 1949, the Communists occupied most of the mainland China, and Mao Zedong of the CCP declared the People's Republic of China in Beijing. The Government of the Republic of China relocated to Taipei and has failed to retake the mainland since then. Taiwan and part of Fujian Province became known as the Free Area of the Republic of China, despite constant threats of communist invasion. The Temporary Provisions Effective During the Period of Communist Rebellion remained in effect until 1991.

== People's Republic of China ==
Some of the largest and most significant rebellions and mass uprisings in the history of the PRC:

- Spirit Soldier rebellion (1959)
- Tibetan uprising (1959)
- Cultural Revolution (1966–1976)
- Tiananmen Square protests and massacre (1989)
- Xinjiang unrest (1950s-present}
- Hong Kong protests (2019–2020)

== See also ==
- Chen Shuozhen
- Miao rebellions
- Ten Great Campaigns
- Zhang Xianzhong
- Jinchuan campaigns
- Chinese Revolution (disambiguation)
