= Battle of Inlon River =

1867 conflict during the Nian Rebellion

- Part of the Nien Rebellion
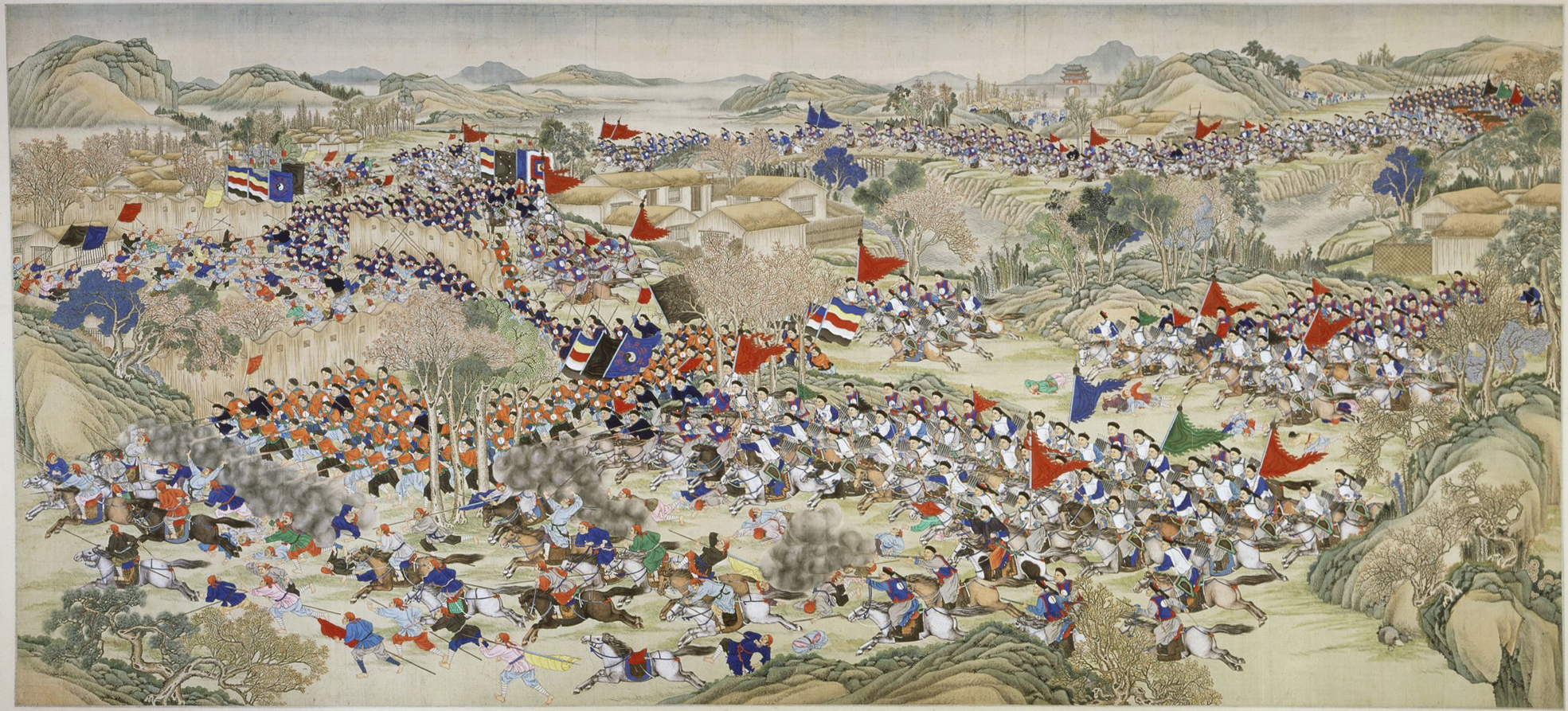
Date	February 19 Lantern Festival, 1867 0500--1800
Location	Inlon River, Anlu, Hubei, China
Result	Decisive Qing victory
Territorial changes	Nien Rebels lost the entire Hubei region

Belligerents
Qing Dynasty	Nien rebels

Commanders and leaders
(Qing dynasty) Liu Mingchuan (Qing dynasty) Bao Chao	Lai Wenguang; Ren Zhu; Niu Hongsheng

Strength
26,000	41,000

Casualties and losses
3,000 soldiers killed, both commanders KIA	8,000 killed 9000 surrendered 5,000 horses captured

The Battle of Inlon River (Chinese: 尹隆河戰役) was a major engagement of the Nian Rebellion, occurring in 1867.
