= Ye Yunlai =

Ye Yunlai (Chinese: 葉芸來; pinyin: Yè Yúnlái, died 1861) was a military leader of the Taiping Rebellion. He began his military career in the Jintian Uprising, later becoming a general, leading Taiping forces to many military victories. He was the chief commander defending Anqing city and never surrendered, ultimately dying in battle. He was awarded the E An in 1857.

== Combat against the Qing military forces ==
The Anqing city, located between Nanjing and Wuhan, was a strategically important city and transfer base of rice. The Qing military forces recovered Wuhan and they prepared to attack Anqing by the Xiang Army.

The Army group of Chen Yucheng commanded over 400,000 for saving Ye Yenlai inner Anqing. Chen and Ye face faced the Xiang Army, numbered at 180,000 soldiers, commanded by general Zeng Guoquan. He later united the 90,000-strong Green Standard Army commanded by the Governor of Hubei province, Hu Linyi (胡林翼).

This large-scale and tough combat lasted from spring 1860 until 1861.

== Sources ==
- Tiān Guó Zhi (天國志)
