= Liang Chengfu =

- Born: 1 January 1820; Yulin, Guangxi, Qing Empire
- Died: 26 June 1865 (aged 45); Chengdu, Sichuan
- Military career
- Allegiance: Qing Empire (to 1849); Taiping (to 1864)
- Service years: 1850–1865
- Rank: Taiping's Lieutenant General
- Conflicts: Western Front: Battle of Guanzhong (1861); Hubei Pocket (1864)

Liang Chengfu (Chinese: 梁成富; died 26 June 1865) was a military leader of the Taiping Rebellion, and known during his military tenure as the King of Qi (啟王). He led Taiping forces to many military victories especially at Hubei and Shaanxi in central and northwest China. He was awarded the E An in 1860. Liang was an important general for late-Taiping and broke out the Hubei Pocket in August 1864 till 1865. He later joined in the Nien Rebellion.

Liang died in battle in 1865.

== Wins ==
Western Front

- Battle of Guanzhong (1861)
- Hubei Pocket (1864)

== Loss ==
- Defended the Longnan from September 1864 to 6 June 1865 and was arrested.
