= Battle of Guanzhong =

Battle of Guanzhong may refer to:

- Battle of Guanzhong (1861), battle between Qing and Taiping Heavenly Kingdom during the Taiping Rebellion
- Battle of Guanzhong (1946–1947), battle between the nationalists and the communists during the Chinese Civil War
