= Noble ranks of the Taiping Heavenly Kingdom =

The Taiping Heavenly Kingdom developed a complicated peerage system for noble ranks.

== King/Prince ==
Wang (王, lit. "king" or "prince") was the highest title of nobility, often hereditary, ranked just below the Heavenly King. There were five ranks of wang:

Ranks	Granted to	Notable people	Notes
King of the First Rank (一等王)	powerful ministers	Yang Xiuqing, the East King (東王 楊秀清); Xiao Chaogui, the West King (西王 蕭朝貴); Feng Yunshan, the South King (南王 馮雲山); Wei Changhui, the North King (北王 韋昌輝); Shi Dakai, the Flank King (翼王 石達開); Hong Rengan, the Shield King (干王 洪仁玕)	
Prince of the Second Rank (二等王)	provincial commanders	Chen Yucheng, the Heroic Prince (英王 陳玉成); Li Xiucheng, the Loyal Prince (忠王 李秀成); Li Shixian, the Servant Prince (侍王 李世賢)	
Prince of the Third Rank (三等王)	important generals	Wang Haiyang, the Peaceful Prince (康王 汪海洋); Huang Wenjin, the Wall Prince (堵王 黃文金); Chen Bingwen, the Obedient Prince (聽王 陳炳文)	
Prince of the Fourth Rank (四等王)		Hong Renzheng, the Sympathetic Prince (恤王 洪仁政)	
Ranged Prince (列王)			Also known as Tiny Prince (小王) the lowest rank prince prince without title

== Non-hereditary nobility ranks ==
Below the king or prince, there were six ranks of nobility (Chinese: 六等爵) in Taiping Heavenly Kingdom: E (義 Yì), An (安 Ān), Fu (福 Fú), Yen (燕 Yān), Yü (豫 Yù) and Hou (侯 Hóu). The nobility titles were not hereditary.

E and An were most highest ranks of the nobility, once they were very noble titles of the Taiping Heavenly Kingdom. If the Heavenly King wanted to promote someone, he gave the person either E or An. However, this rule was challenged after 1860 because the nobility titles had been given too freely.

Ranks	Male titles	Female titles	Derived from	Creation time	Notes
1	E (義)	Nü zhen jiang (女貞姜)	Prince Yi (義王, lit. "the Righteousness Prince"), the title of Shi Dakai	1856	
2	An (安)	Nü zhen an (女貞安)	Prince An (安王, lit. "the Peaceful Prince"), the title of Hong Renfa	1856	
3	Fu (福)	Nü zhen fu (女貞福)	Prince Fu (福王, lit. "the Prosperous Prince"), the title of Hong Renda	1856	
4	Yen (燕)	Nü zhen yen (女貞燕)	Prince of Yan (燕王), the title of Qin Rigang	1856	
5	Yü (豫)	Nü zhen yü (女貞豫)	Prince of Yu (豫王), the title of Hu Yihuang	1854	
6	Hou (侯)	Nü zhen hou (女貞侯)			Equal to marquess

=== Notable people ===
- Chen Yucheng was titled Cheng Tian Yi (成天義) in 1857
- Liang Chengfu was titled Zeng Tian Yi (則天義) in 1860
- Tan Shaoguang was titled Jian Tian Yi (建天義) in 1861
- Ye Yenlai was titled Sho Tian An (受天安) in 1857
- Hong Rengan was titled Gan Tian Fu (干天福) in 1859
- Qin Rigang was titled Ding Tian Yan (頂天燕) in 1856
- Hu Yihuang was titled Hu Tian Yu (護天豫) in 1854

== See also ==
- Royal and noble ranks of the Qing dynasty
