= Battle of Hubei =

1864 battle of the Taiping Rebellion

Hubei Pocket
Date	June,1864 – November 1864
Location	Whole Hubei and border southern Anhui
Result	Qing victory
Territorial changes	Qing recover whole Hubei and southern Anhui

Belligerents
Qing dynasty	Taiping Heavenly Kingdom

Commanders and leaders
Viceroy of HuGuang Guam Wing; Sengge Rinchen	Lai Wenguang; Chen Decai; Liang Chengfu; Ma Ronghe; Lan Chengchun; Fan Ruzeng

Strength
440,000 Green Standard Army	300,000 Taipings

Casualties and losses
Unknown;	60,000 deaths, 200,000 surrender, Chen Decai dies by suicide

The Battle of Hubei (Chinese: 湖北包圍戰) was a battle of encirclement that took place between late July and early December 1864, near the end of Taiping Rebellion, in Hubei, China. It was, for all intents and purposes, the last desperate attempt in the Taiping Heavenly Kingdom's war effort to win the war against the Qing dynasty, as more than 200,000 troops were taken prisoner, but a remainder of 19,000 Taiping troops led by Lai Wenguang broke out and marched into southern Henan and combined with 150,000 troops from the Nian Rebellion.
