= Dissolution of China =

Dissolution of present-day China occurred multiple times throughout the history of present-day China. It resulted in multiple concurrent kingdoms or dynasties, like the following:

- Partition of Jin, which resulted in the Warring States period (c. 475 – 221 BC)
- Three Kingdoms (220–280 AD)
- Sixteen Kingdoms (304–439 AD)
- Five Dynasties and Ten Kingdoms period (907–960)

== See also ==
- Chinese uniformity, term referring to uniformity of present-day China
- Chinese civil wars
