= Battle of Anqing =

Siege of the Taiping Rebellion (1860–61)

- Part of the Taiping Rebellion
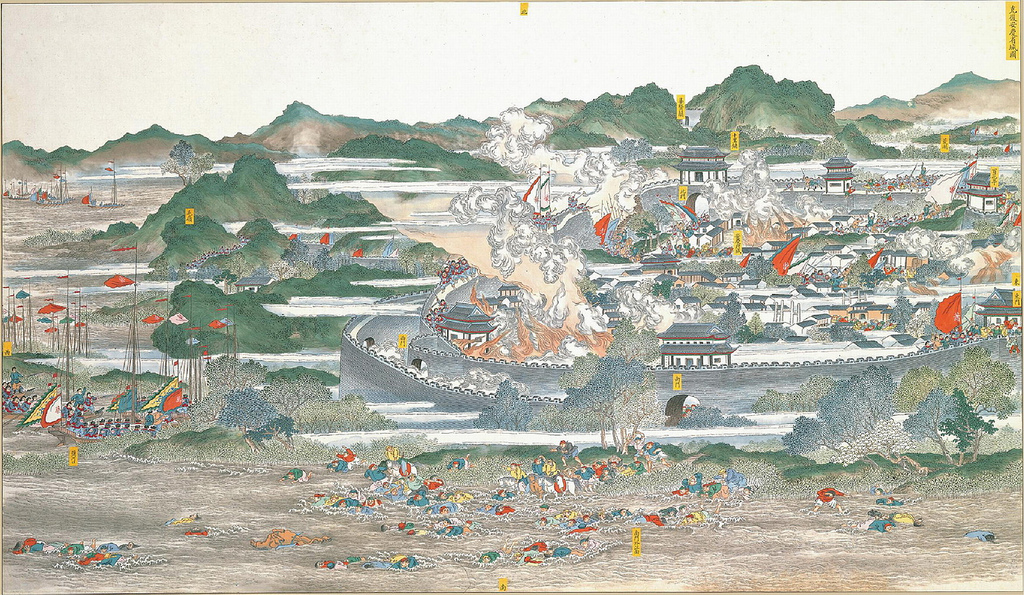
Date	September 1860 – September 5, 1861
Location	Anqing, Anhui, China
Result	Qing victory

Belligerents
Qing dynasty: Hunan Army	Taiping Heavenly Kingdom

Commanders and leaders
Zeng Guofan; Zeng Guoquan	Chen Yucheng; Ye Yunlai †; Wu Dincai †

Strength
10,000+ Hunan Army soldiers	20,000+ garrisoned troops

Casualties and losses
The estimated loss is 8,000~12,000	12,000 killed
- Approximately 10,000~20,000 civilians were massacred

The Battle of Anqing (安慶之戰) was a prolonged siege of the prefecture-level city of Anqing in Anhui, China, initiated by Hunan Army forces loyal to the Qing Dynasty against the armies of the Taiping Heavenly Kingdom. The siege began in September 1860 and ended on September 5, 1861, when imperial forces under the command of Zeng Guoquan breached the walls of the city and occupied it.

Anqing was strategically important as it allowed access to the lower reaches of the Yangtze River, including the Taiping capital of Nanjing downriver. It served as the base of Taiping activities in Anhui, Hubei and Hunan. It had been held by the Taiping since the early stages of the Rebellion in June 1853. Zeng Guofan, commander of the provincial Hunan Army and de facto leader of the dynasty's war against the Taiping, saw a need to reclaim the walled city to further his campaign against the rebellion along the Yangtze. A siege of Anqing was initiated in late-1860 involving up to 10,000 Hunan Army troops.

In October 1860, the "Brave King", Chen Yucheng, was dispatched by the Taiping leadership with an army of over 100,000 to test imperial forces at Anqing, with the ultimate aim of seizing Wuchang upriver. However, while en route to Anqing, they were intercepted by 20,000 elite Manchu cavalry at Tongcheng and forced to retreat.

Foreign intervention also strengthened the Qing position at Anqing. In a family letter dated June 13, 1861, Zeng Guofan ordered his own ships to monitor British commercial vessels after noticing foreign merchants unloading rice to the rebels at Anqing. Zeng successfully obtained the support of British Consul Frederick Bruce in enforcing a naval blockade at Anqing to prevent the rebels from trading with foreign merchants.

As the protracted siege continued into the summer of 1861, the population of Anqing was increasingly starved and cannibalism was reported. In late August, Chen Yucheng made a final desperate attempt to break the siege of Anqing, but was repelled at the Jixian Pass after vigorous fighting with Zeng Guofan's land and naval forces. With his troops exhausted, Chen retreated on September 3, and two days later the city's walls were breached.

With Anqing in imperial hands, the Taiping lost their stronghold in central China. Zeng would establish Anqing as his new headquarters and use it to coordinate the imperial assault on the Taiping capital at Nanjing.
