= Zhang Lexing =

Chinese guerilla leader (1810–1863)

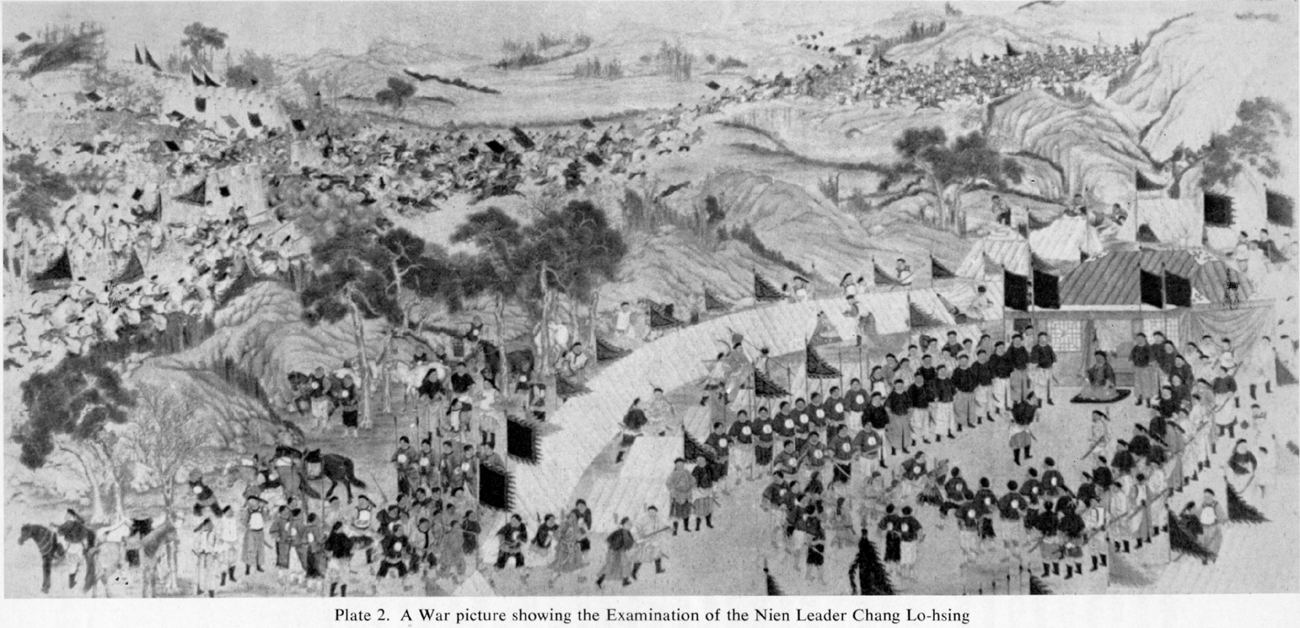
The examination of the Nien leader Chang Lo-hsing

Zhang Lexing (Chinese: 張樂行; Wade–Giles: Chang Lo-hsing; 1810–1863) was a Chinese guerrilla leader during the Nian Rebellion in China.

Zhang was originally a landlord and a member of a powerful lineage involved in salt-smuggling. In 1852 he was chosen to lead the Nian, and in 1856 was bestowed with the title "Lord of the Alliance" when the Nian organised themselves under a banner system inspired by the Eight Banners of the Qing dynasty. Zhang also at this time claimed the title of "Great Han Prince with the Mandate of Heaven". He later joined forces with the Taiping Rebellion and became the "Commander of the Northern Expedition".

In 1863 he was defeated and captured along with his son and adopted son by Mongol cavalry general Sengge Rinchen. Prior to being executed, he confessed that he could no longer remember how many places he had plundered; he also claimed to not know the whereabouts of his wife, who had been chased off by government troops, or his brother Zhang Minxing, who had left for the southwest along with several thousand men, and that other Nian leaders had already been killed.

The Nian rebellion would continue for another five years. Zhang's nephew Zhang Zongyu succeeded him in command of the Nian armies, with Sengge Richen being killed in a Nian ambush only two years after Zhang's death.

== Other sources ==
- Chiang, Siang-tseh. The Nien Rebellion, Seattle, 1954.
- Teng, Ssu-yu. The Nien Rebellion and Their Guerilla Warfare, 1851–1868, Paris, 1961.
