= Chinese Revolution =

The Chinese Revolution can refer to:

- 1911 Revolution or Xinhai Revolution: the October 10, 1911 uprising against the Qing Dynasty and establishment of the Republic of China in 1912.
- Second Revolution (Republic of China), the 1913 rebellion against Yuan Shikai
- Constitutional Protection Movement, also known as the "Third Revolution", the movement led by Sun Yat Sen to resist the Beiyang government from 1917 to 1922
- Northern Expedition, a military campaign by Chiang Kai-shek's Nationalist forces against the Beiyang government in 1926–28, leading to the establishment of the Nationalist government in Nanking.
- Chinese Civil War, the conflict between the Nationalist government and the Communists from 1927 to 1949
  - Chinese Communist Revolution, the victory of the Chinese Communist Party in the final stage of the Chinese Civil War in 1949
- Cultural Revolution, a sociopolitical purge movement led by Mao Zedong against capitalist and traditionalist elements of Chinese society from 1966 to 1976

== See also ==
- List of rebellions in China
- Boxer Rebellion
