= Chen Yucheng =

Chen Yucheng 陳玉成
- Heroic Prince (英王)
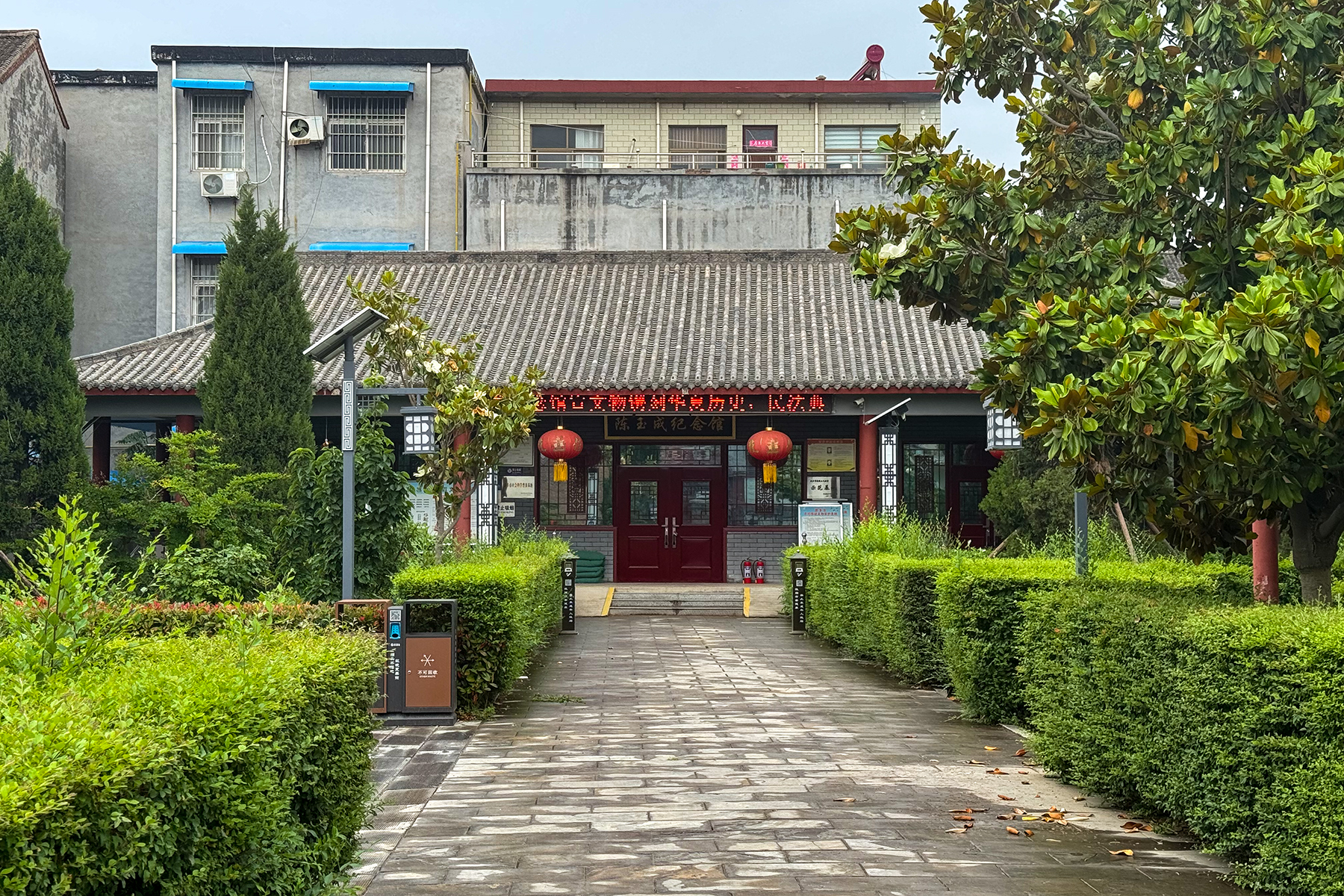
- Memorial to Chen Yucheng, Henan

Heroic Prince of the Heavenly Kingdom
- Reign: 1859–1862
- Heavenly King: Hong Xiuquan
- Born: Chen Picheng (陳丕成); 1837; Teng County, Guangxi, Qing Empire
- Died: 1 May 1862 (aged 24–25) near Xinxiang, Henan
Regnal name
- 英王祿千歲
- Religion: God Worshipping Society
- Military career
- Allegiance: (Qing dynasty) Qing Empire (1848–1851); Taiping Heavenly Kingdom (1851–1862)
- Service years: 1848–1862
- Rank: Field Marshal
- Nickname: Four-eyed dog (四眼狗)
- Conflicts: Eastern Front: First rout the Army Group Jiangnan(1856); Second rout the Army Group Jiangnan(1860); Western Front: Second Battle of Wuhan (1854); Third Battle of Wuhan (1855); Battle of Tongcheng (1857); Battle of Sanhe (1858); Battle of Anqing (1861)
- Awards: Chen Tian Yi (成天義)

Chen Yucheng (simplified Chinese: 陈玉成; traditional Chinese: 陳玉成; pinyin: Chén Yùchéng; Wade–Giles: Ch'en Yü-ch'eng), born Chen Picheng (simplified Chinese: 陈丕成; traditional Chinese: 陳丕成; pinyin: Chén Pīchéng; c. 1837 – May 1862), was a Chinese general during the Taiping Rebellion and later served as the Heroic (Ying) Prince (or Brave King) of the Taiping Heavenly Kingdom in the later stages of the rebellion, nicknamed "Four-eyed Dog" because of two prominent moles below his eyes.

Born to a peasant family in Guangxi around 1836, Chen Yucheng joined Taiping rebel forces during the March to the Yangtze in 1851. 15 years old at the time of his enlistment, Chen quickly rose through the ranks and in 1856, in the aftermath of the Tianjing incident, an internal power struggle within the Taiping leadership, he was promoted to a general. He was awarded the E An in 1857.

After commanding a series of successful military operations west of Nanjing between 1856 and 1858, Chen was given the title of Prince Ying by the Taiping Kings in the following year. Together with fellow Taiping General Li Xiucheng, Chen defended and released the capital during the siege of Nanjing in 1860.

In February 1861, Chen Yucheng led 100,000 troops in a preparation to attack Wuhan, leading one half of a pincer movement in an offensive against Imperial forces. However, he was on the defensive and forced to withdraw. After his retreat the Xiang Army concentrated all its forces on the Siege of Anqing.

Chen was executed by Imperial Qing forces in May 1862.
