= Lai Wenguang =

Military leader

- Born: 1827; Meizhou, Guangdong, Qing dynasty
- Died: 10 January 1868 (aged 40–41); Yangzhou, Nanjing, Qing dynasty
- Military career
- Allegiance: Qing dynasty (to 1849); Taiping (to 1864); Nian Rebellion(to 1868)
- Service years: 1856–1868
- Rank: Colonel General
- Unit: Eastern Nian Army
- Conflicts: Eastern Front: Battle of Jiangnan (1860); Battle of Shanghai(1860), first time, Fallen down Qingpu District in June; Western Front: Third Battle of Wuhan(1856); Battle of Sanhe(1858); Battle of Guanzhong (1861); Hubei Pocket(1864); Nian Rebellion(1864-1868): Battle of Inlon River(1867)

Lai Wenguang (Chinese: 賴文光; 1827–1868) was a Chinese military leader of the Taiping Rebellion and Nian Rebellion, and known during his military tenure as the King of Zun (遵王). He served under Hong Xiuquan's Taiping Heavenly Kingdom, and was the younger brother of Hong Xiuquan's wife. He led Taiping forces to many military victories. Lai became the leader of Eastern Nian Army in 1866. In June 1865, he commanded Nian cavalry forces of 90,000 in surrounding and attacking the capital Beijing, nearly successfully. Lai surrendered to Qing forces on January 5, 1868. He was executed by Li Hongzhang after interrogation in February.

Lai Wenguang attracted many northern Chinese to unite fighting against the Qing government because people believed the Aisin Gioro had a secret agenda to stage a coup against Empress Dowager Cixi.

His elder brother Lai Hanying was a king in the Taiping Rebellion early on, and one of the few of kings still alive after the civil war ended in 1870. As a child, future revolutionary Sun Yat-sen often heard the story of the Taiping Rebellion.
