= Nian Rebellion =

Armed rebellion in Northern China from 1851 to 1868

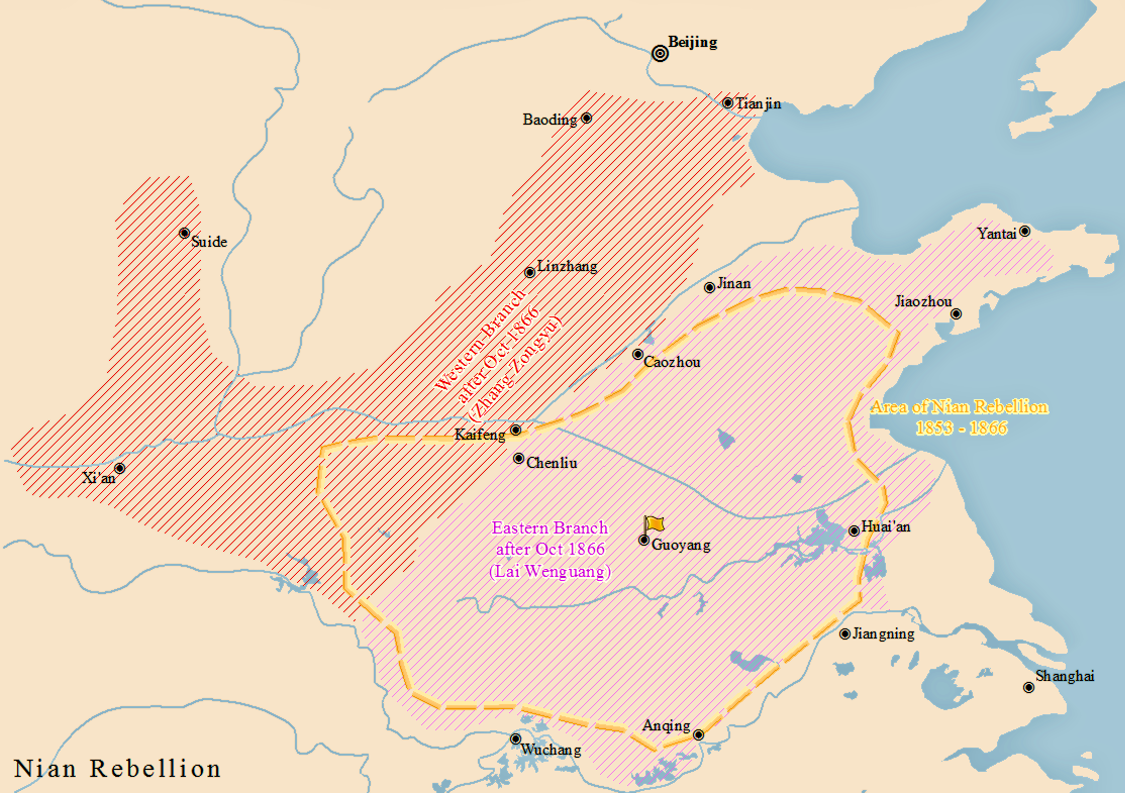
- Map of Nian Rebellion
Date	1851–1868
Location	Northern China
Result	Qing victory

Belligerents
Qing dynasty	Nian militias: Five Banner alliance (1856–58); "Army of the Taipings"; Henan armies; Co-belligerents: Taiping Heavenly Kingdom; White Lotus rebels

Commanders and leaders
(Qing dynasty) Zeng Guofan (Qing dynasty) Li Hongzhang (Qing dynasty) Zuo Zongtang (Qing dynasty) Sengge Rinchen †	Zhang Lexing (executed); Su Sanniang; Lai Wenguang (executed); Zhang Zongyu ‡‡ Ren Zhu †; Sun Kuixin; Miao Peilin †; Fan Ruzeng †; Niu Hongsheng †

Strength
~500,000	~200,000

Casualties and losses
- 100,000+ killed

The Nian Rebellion (Chinese: 捻亂; pinyin: Niǎn Luàn) was an insurrection against the Qing dynasty in northern China from 1851 to 1868, contemporaneously with the Taiping Rebellion (1850–1864) in southern China. The rebellion was suppressed, but the population and economic losses contributed to the collapse of the empire in the early 20th century.

== Background ==
Nian is a word borrowed from the Huaibei dialect, a form of Central Plains Mandarin, where it was used to refer to loosely affiliated gangs or groups or "bandits". The Nian movement was formed in the late 1840s by Zhang Lexing and, by 1851, numbered approximately 2000. Unlike the Taiping Rebellion movement, the Nian initially had no clear goals or objectives, aside from criticism of the Qing government. Their slogan was "'kill the rich and aid the poor.'" However, the Nian were provoked into taking direct action against the Imperial regime following a series of environmental disasters.

The 1851 Yellow River flood deluged hundreds of thousands of square miles and caused immense loss of life. The Qing government slowly began cleaning up after the disaster but could not provide effective aid, as government finances had been drained during the First Opium War and the ongoing Taiping Rebellion. The damage created by the disaster had still not been repaired when, in 1855, the river burst its banks again, drowning thousands and devastating the fertile province of Jiangsu. Along with the destruction caused by the floods famine spread. At the time, the Qing government was trying to negotiate a deal with the European powers, and as state finances had been so severely depleted, the regime was again unable to provide effective relief. This enraged the Nian movement, which blamed the Europeans for contributing to the nation troubles, and increasingly viewed the Qing government as incompetent.

The Nian rebels seemed to have been influenced by the previous 1794 White Lotus Rebellion, recruiting from secret societies and sects such as the White Lotus, and actively borrowing their terminology and symbols, examples being the practice of sworn brotherhood, five colours of banners, flags with eight trigrams, and the widespread use of units of woman warriors. Zhang Lexing, leader of the rebellion, used the title "Bright King of the Great Han", an address reminiscent of White Lotus leadership positions.

Political scientists Valerie Hudson and Andrea den Boer suggest that the rebellion was fueled, at least in part, by decades of female infanticide caused by the flood-related economic misery, leading to a large population of frustrated young men without any women to marry, perhaps as many as a quarter of all young men in the area being in this category of "bare branches".

== Rebellion ==
The Nian rebels were to a large degree desperate and poor peasants who banded together in bandit groups simply to survive. However, as natural disasters grew worse, these bandit groups grew increasingly large, and eventually became armies that were able to directly challenge the imperial government. Nevertheless, the main interest of most Nian members remained plundering communities that were better off, as well as resisting taxation. Religious motifs likewise were of little importance to the Nian rebels. While the Nian forces possibly inherited some of their symbols such as red turbans and Eight Trigram flags from the White Lotus, the overall influence of spiritual movements such as the White Lotus or the God Worshipping Society on them was low. For example, White Lotus rebels sometimes fought alongside Nian groups, but the latter sometimes also attacked the former in hopes of plunder. On average, the Nian groups in Henan remained more similar to mere bandits than the Nian in Anhui. Overall, the Nian movement "remained primarily the expression of mundane strategies of survival" according to historian Elizabeth J. Perry. They were never revolutionaries, and besides slogans that called for death of government officials and the rich, as well as hopes for a more just society, they lacked clear, well-defined goals. That some Nian armies became actual rebel movements was mostly due to the ambitions of individual Nian leaders who wanted to become legitimate rulers.

The Nian utilized cavalry in part to aid in looting, which served to support both the Nians' forces and their home communities. In contrast to their mobile cavalry, the Nians' defensive tactics were based on the so-called "earthwall communities" they controlled. Support of the peasantry proved crucial and provided the true base of the Nians' power.

In 1851, the Nian began raiding the grain stores and silver caches of villages. Upon the seizure of Nanjing by the Taiping Heavenly Kingdom, some Nian leaders sought an alliance with the Taiping. While Hong Xiuquan bestowed titles upon the Nian leaders and the Nian and the Taiping occasionally cooperated, full coordination between the two rebellions was never achieved. Cases in which Nian armies submitted or even fully joined the Taipings remained rare, as most remained bandit armies that were only interested in imminent profit and survival.

In 1855, Zhang Lexing took direct action by launching attacks against government troops in central China. By the summer, the fast-moving Nian cavalry, well-trained and fully equipped with modern firearms, had cut the lines of communication between Beijing and the Qing armies fighting the Taiping rebels in the south. Qing forces were badly overstretched as rebellions broke out across China, allowing the Nian armies to conquer large tracts of land and gain control over economically vital areas. The Nian fortified their captured cities and used them as bases to launch cavalry attacks against Qing troops in the countryside, prompting local towns to fortify themselves against Nian raiding parties. This resulted in constant fighting which devastated the previously rich provinces of Jiangsu and Hunan.

In 1856, several Nian bands formed an alliance led by Zhang Lexing, organizing themselves into a loose confederation of five armies. Each army was identified by a colored banner, operated largely autonomously, and recruited mostly people belonging to a single clan. As result, each banner army had a core area which consisted of a number of villages whose inhabitants were related to each other. Due to the widely differing numbers of the involved clans, the banner armies were accordingly smaller or bigger: the yellow banner army, led by Zhang himself, drew its forces from 18 villages; the white banner army of Kung Teh from 13; the red banner army of Hou Shih-wei from 12; the blue banner army of Han Lao-wan from just six; and the black banner army of Su T'ien-fu from one hundred villages. Though Zhang tried to impose more order and coordination upon the alliance, he enjoyed only limited success in this regard. Internal differences caused the alliance to quickly fall apart, and by 1858 it was effectively dissolved.

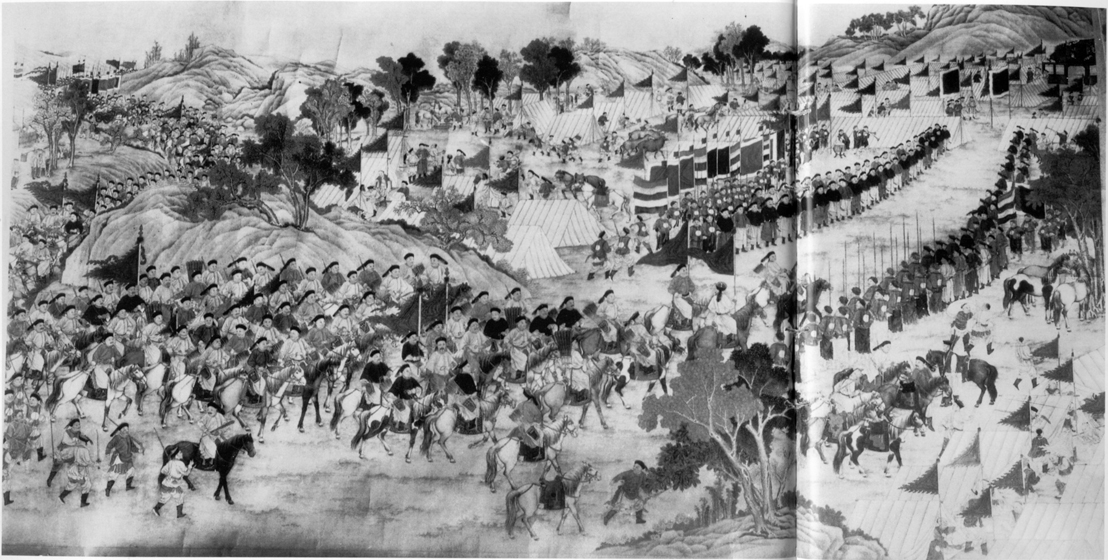
Triumphal Procession after the Campaign against the Nian

In early 1856, the Qing government sent the Mongol General Senggelinqin, who had recently crushed a large Taiping army, to defeat the Nian. Senggelinqin's army captured several fortified cities and destroyed most of the Nian infantry, and killed Zhang Lexing himself in an ambush in 1863. However, in late 1864, the Nian movement survived as skilled Taiping commanders Lai Wenguang (賴文光) (1827–1868) and Fan Ruzeng (1840–1867) arrived to take control of the Nian forces, and the bulk of the Nian cavalry remained intact. Senggelinqin's infantry-based army could not stop the fast moving cavalry from devastating the countryside and launching surprise attacks on Imperial troops.

In late 1865, Senggelinqin and his bodyguards were ambushed by Nian troops and killed, in the Battle of Goulawjai. The Qing regime sent General Zeng Guofan (曾国藩), who had recently ended the Taiping Rebellion by capturing the Taiping capital, to take command of Imperial forces protecting Beijing. They provided him with modern artillery and weapons, purchased from the Europeans at exorbitant prices. Zeng's army set about building canals and trenches to hem in the Nian cavalry, an effective but slow and expensive method. General Zeng was relieved of command after Nian infantry broke through one of his defense lines, and he was replaced by Generals Li Hongzhang and Zuo Zongtang equipped with more European artillery and firearms.

In late 1866, the remaining Nian forces split into two, with the Eastern Army, under command of Lai Wenguang, stationed in central China whilst the Western Army advanced on Beijing. The Western Army, commanded by Zhang Zongyu, Zhang Lexing's brother's son, was defeated southwest of Beijing by Qing troops, leaving large swathes of Nian territory exposed to a Qing counter-attack. By late 1867, Li Hongzhang's and Zuo Zongtang's troops had recaptured most Nian territory, and in early 1868, the remnants were crushed by the combined forces of the government's troops and the Ever Victorious Army.

== Military equipment ==
The Nian rebels were equipped with guns (including modern Western guns), muskets, and a significant quantity of cannons up to 5000 pounds in weight.

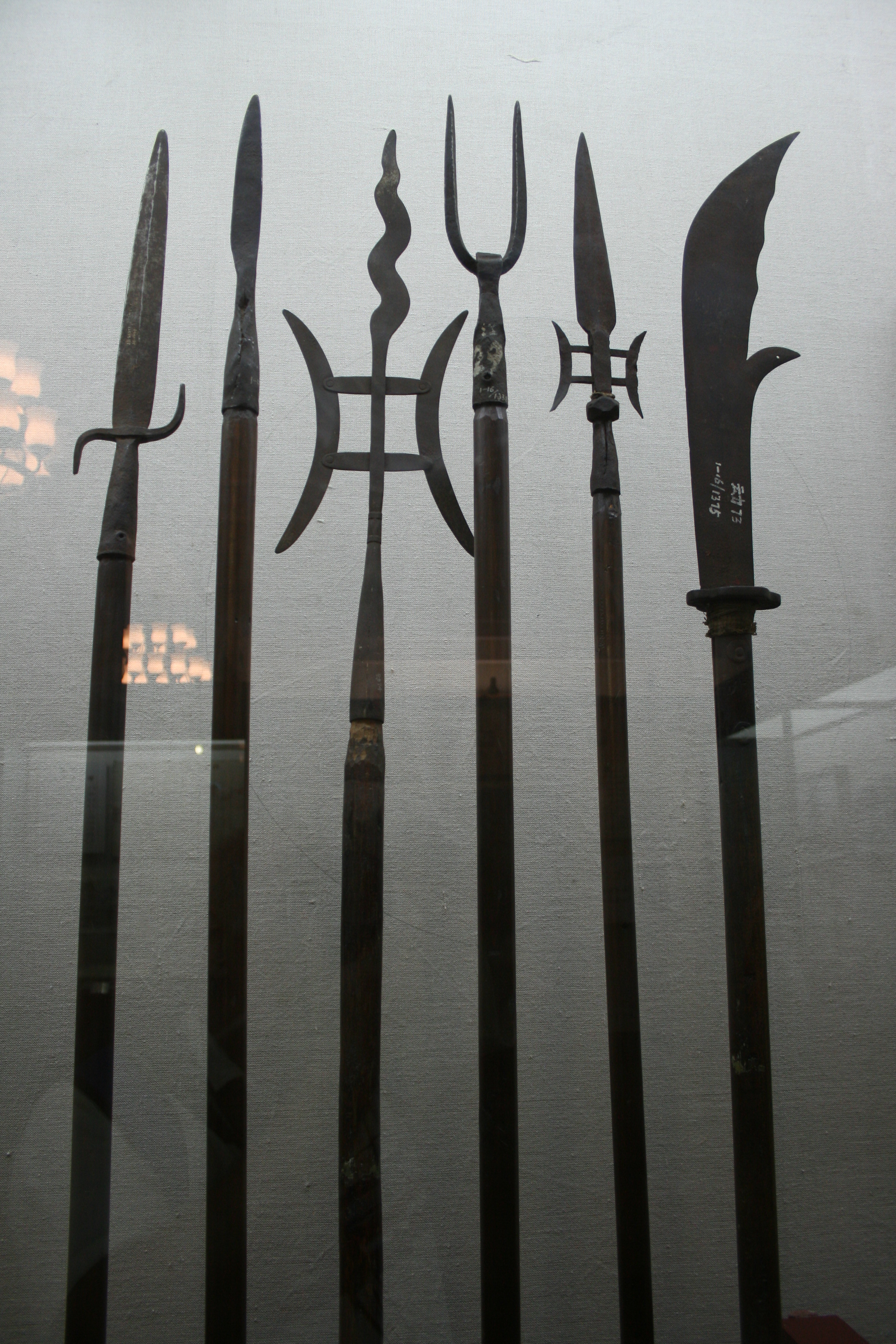
Infantry weapons used by Nian rebels

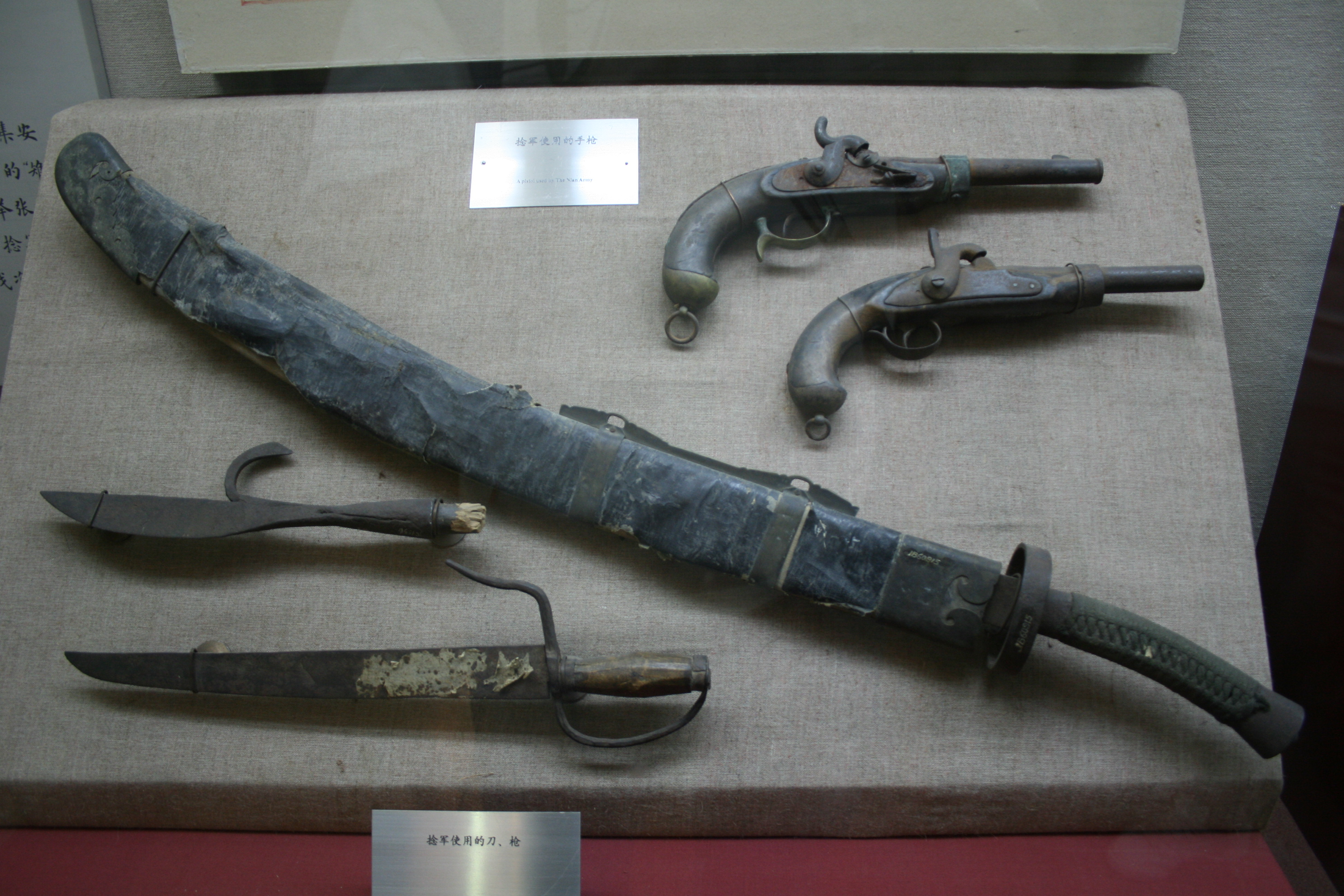
Knife and pistol used by Nian rebels

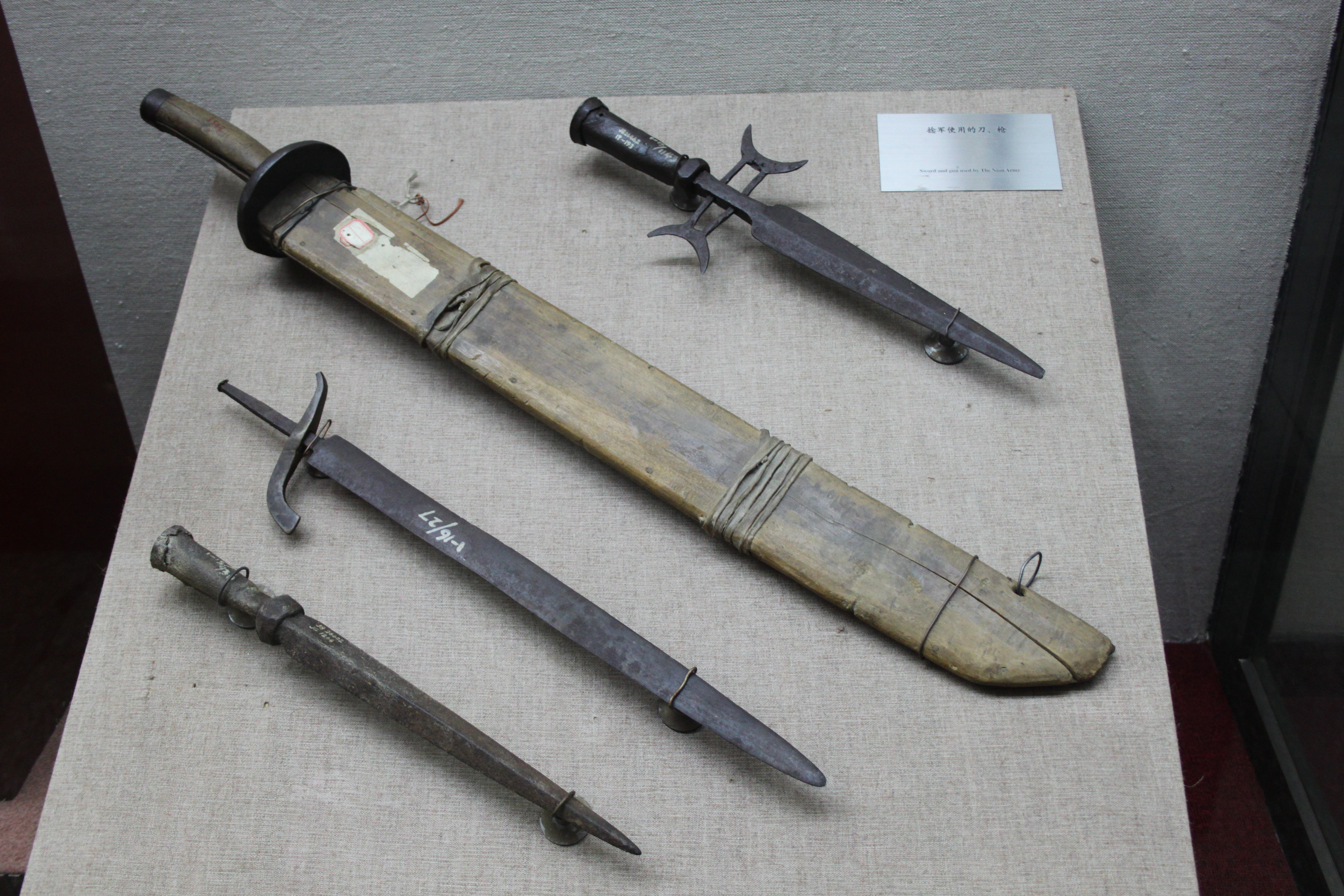
Various swords used by Nian rebels

== Assessment ==
The Nian rebellion failed to topple the Qing dynasty largely because it failed to make alliances with other rebels, especially the Taiping movement. The Nian only symbolically supported Taiping efforts by accepting the Taiping king's "appointments", but refusing to follow his orders. Had the Nian and Taipings joined forces, the Qing government would have been faced with a formidable threat, in spite of its alliances with European powers.

Despite the Nians' failure to seize power, the events of the rebellion dealt a severe blow to the Qing dynasty. The environmental disasters of 1851 and 1855 devastated the richest provinces of China, depriving the Qing regime of tax income and trade duties. The endless fighting between Nian troops and Qing forces, who made widespread use of scorched earth tactics, ruined the countryside and resulted in countless deaths. Although the Nian rebellion was smaller than that of the Taiping, it severely drained government finances, devastated the richest areas of China, and left China's economy in a very precarious state. In the long term, the Nian rebellion was to become one of the major factors in the collapse of Qing China.

== See also ==
- List of rebellions in China
- Taiping Rebellion
- Punti–Hakka Clan Wars
- Miao Rebellion (1854–73)
- Dungan revolt (1862–1877)
- Panthay Rebellion
- Nepalese-Tibetan War
- Hongmen
