= SMS Hertha (1897) =

Protected cruiser of the German Imperial Navy

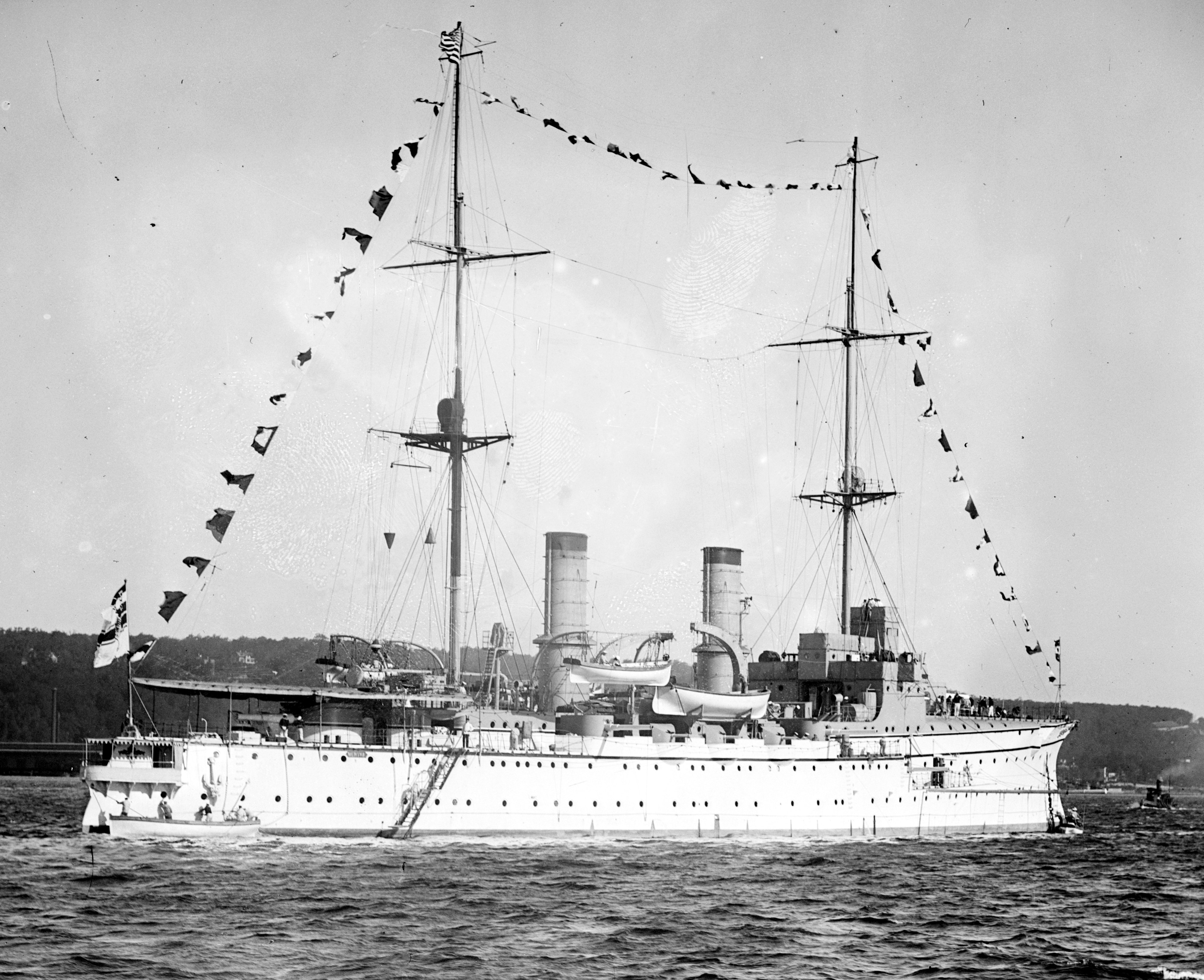
- SMS Hertha in the United States

History

German Empire
- Name: Hertha
- Namesake: Hertha
- Builder: AG Vulcan, Stettin
- Laid down: 15 February 1896
- Launched: 14 April 1897
- Commissioned: 23 July 1898
- Decommissioned: 16 November 1914
- Stricken: 6 December 1919
- Fate: Scrapped in 1920

General characteristics
- Class & type: Victoria Louise-class cruiser
- Displacement: Normal: 5,660 t (5,570 long tons); Full load: 6,491 t (6,388 long tons)
- Length: 110.6 m (363 ft)
- Beam: 17.4 m (57 ft)
- Draft: 6.58 m (21.6 ft)
- Installed power: 12 × Belleville boilers; 10,000 PS (9,900 ihp)
- Propulsion: 3 × triple-expansion steam engines; 3 × screw propellers
- Speed: 19 knots (35 km/h; 22 mph)
- Range: 3,412 nmi (6,319 km; 3,926 mi) at 12 kn (22 km/h; 14 mph)
- Complement: 31 officers; 446 enlisted men
- Armament: 2 × 21 cm (8.3 in) guns; 8 × 15 cm (5.9 in) guns; 10 × 8.8 cm (3.5 in) guns; 10 × 3.7 cm (1.5 in) Maxim machine cannon; 3 × 45 cm (17.7 in) torpedo tubes
- Armor: Deck: 4 to 10 cm (1.6 to 3.9 in); Turrets: 10 cm; Casemates: 10 cm; Conning tower: 15 cm (5.9 in)

SMS Hertha was a protected cruiser of the Victoria Louise class, (Note: The class is sometimes referred to as the Hertha class, since Hertha was the first member to be ordered, though Victoria Louise was launched first.) built for the German Imperial Navy (Kaiserliche Marine) in the 1890s. Hertha was laid down at the AG Vulcan shipyard in 1895, launched in April 1897, and commissioned into the Navy in July 1898. The ship was armed with a battery of two 21 cm guns and eight 15 cm guns and had a top speed of 19 knots (35 km/h; 22 mph). Though the five Victoria Louise-class cruisers proved to be disappointing in some ways, they marked the beginning of a decade of German cruiser construction.

The ship's first major operation was a cruise to the Mediterranean Sea to escort Kaiser Wilhelm II; while there, Hertha received orders to join the East Asia Squadron. She operated there for the first six years of her career, and during that time, she served briefly as the Squadron flagship in 1900. Her crew saw significant action during the Boxer Uprising in 1900; Hertha contributed landing parties to the Seymour Expedition and to the force that captured the Taku Forts. The following four years passed peacefully for the ship, but by late 1904 she was in need of a thorough overhaul that necessitated a return to Germany.

After arriving in Germany in 1905, she was modernized and used as a training ship in 1908, following the completion of the refit. Hertha made several training cruises over the following years, including a visit to the United States in 1909. She cruised with the Mediterranean Division in 1912. At the outbreak of World War I, Hertha was mobilized into V Scouting Group, but served in front-line duty only briefly. She was used as a barracks ship after 1915, and ultimately sold for scrapping in 1920.

== Design ==
In the early 1890s, elements in the German naval command structure grappled with what type of cruiser ought to be built to fulfill the various needs of the fleet. The Reichsmarineamt (RMA—Imperial Navy Office) preferred to build a combination of large cruisers of around 6,000 t (5,900 long tons) along the lines of SMS Kaiserin Augusta and significantly smaller vessels of about 1,500 t (1,476 long tons) to support them, while the Oberkommando der Marine (Naval High Command) argued that a uniform force of 3,000 t (2,953 long tons) cruisers was preferable. In the event, the RMA carried the day and three 6,000-ton cruisers were authorized in 1895; this was in part due to the intervention of Kaiser Wilhelm II and in part due to comparisons with foreign contemporaries, like the United States' Baltimore and the Austro-Hungarian Kaiserin und Königin Maria Theresia. The experience of Japanese cruisers during the contemporaneous First Sino-Japanese War showed the benefit of larger 21 cm (8.3 in) guns, which were adopted for the main battery of the Victoria Louise class.

They resembled the larger Kaiser Friedrich III-class battleships, designed at the same time, albeit at reduced scale. The new cruisers proved to be unsatisfactory as fleet cruisers, because they were too slow and they lacked sufficient armor protection. They nevertheless provided good service as overseas cruisers and later as training ships. They (along with the contemporaneous armored cruiser Fürst Bismarck) nevertheless marked the beginning of a trend of German cruiser construction that lasted through the Scharnhorst-class cruisers built a decade later.

=== Characteristics ===
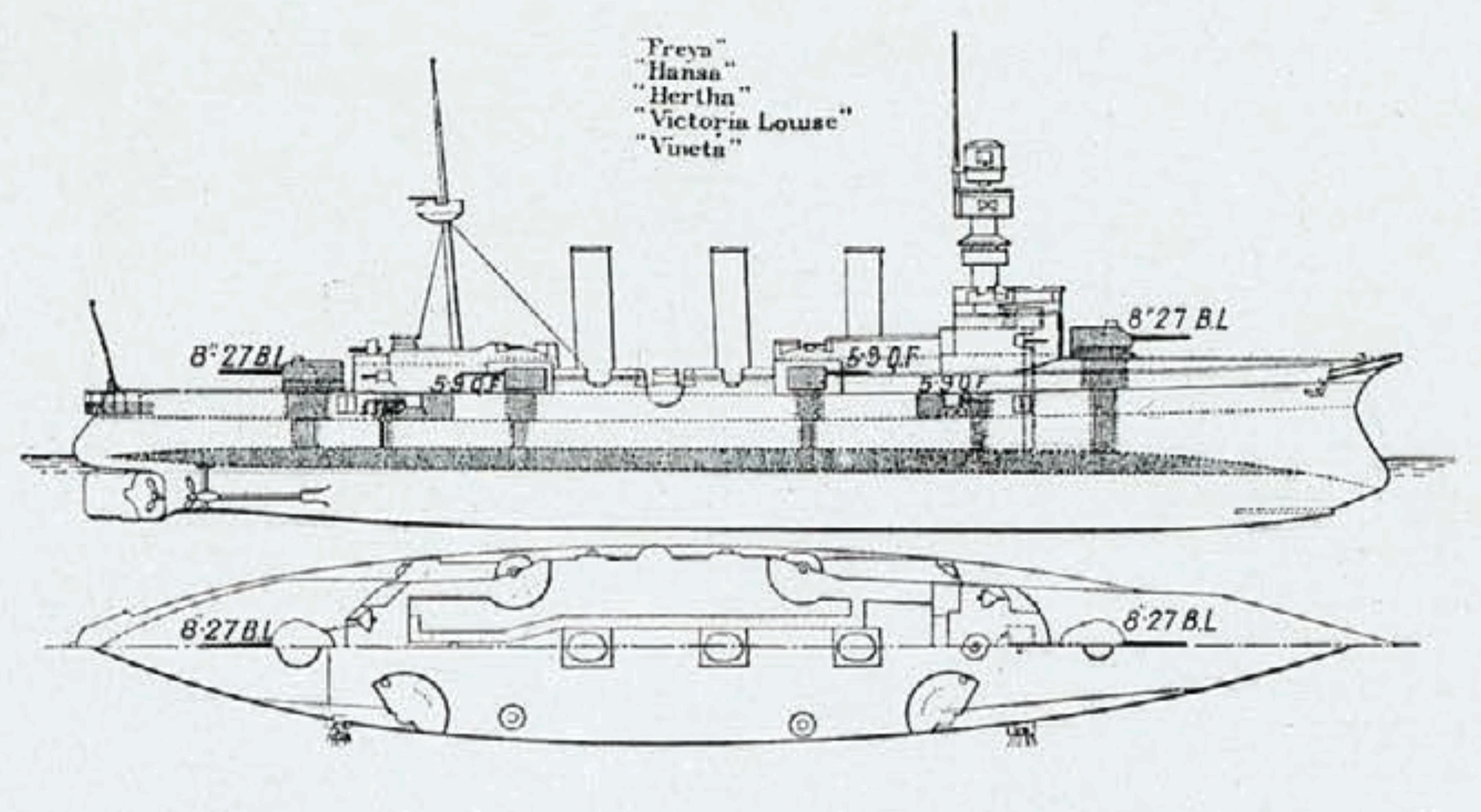
Plan and profile drawing of the Victoria Louise class

Hertha was 110.6 meters (363 ft) long overall and had a beam of 17.4 m (57 ft) and a draft of 6.58 m (21.6 ft) forward. As designed, she displaced 5,660 t (5,570 long tons), and at full load, her displacement rose to 6,491 t (6,388 long tons). The ship's superstructure included a large conning tower forward and a smaller deck house further aft. She was fitted with a heavy military mast atop the conning tower and a lighter pole mast further aft. Her hull featured a flared clipper bow combined with a pronounced ram. The ship had a crew of 31 officers and 446 enlisted men.

Her propulsion system consisted of three vertical 4-cylinder triple-expansion steam engines, each driving a single screw propeller. Steam was provided by twelve coal-fired Belleville boilers, which were vented through three funnels. Her engines were rated for 10,000 metric horsepower (9,900 ihp), and provided a top speed of 19 knots (35 km/h; 22 mph). Coal storage amounted to 950 t (930 long tons; 1,050 short tons) if all available spaces were used. The ship had a range of approximately 3,412 nautical miles (6,319 km; 3,926 mi) at the more economical speed of 12 kn (22 km/h; 14 mph).

The ship was armed with a main battery of two 21 cm (8.3 in) SK L/40 guns in single gun turrets, one forward and one aft. The guns were supplied with 58 rounds of ammunition each. They had a range of 16,300 m (53,500 ft). Hertha also carried a secondary battery of eight 15 cm (5.9 in) SK L/40 guns. Four were mounted in turrets amidships and the other four were placed in casemates, two abreast the conning tower and the others abreast the mainmast. These guns had a range of 13,700 m (44,900 ft). She also carried ten 8.8 cm (3.5 in) SK L/30 guns for defense against torpedo boats. The gun armament was rounded out by ten 3.7 cm (1.5 in) Maxim machine cannon. She was also equipped with three 45 cm (17.7 in) torpedo tubes with eight torpedoes, two launchers were mounted on the broadside and the third was in the bow, all below the waterline.

The ship was protected with Krupp armor; her deck was 4 cm (1.6 in) on the horizontal with sloped sides that were 10 cm (3.9 in) thick. Her main and secondary battery turrets had 10 cm thick sides and the secondary casemates had the same level of protection. The conning tower had 15 cm thick sides.

=== Modifications ===
Between 1906 and 1908, Hertha underwent a major reconstruction at the Kaiserliche Werft (Imperial Shipyard) in Danzig. This included replacing her boilers with new Navy-type models, and the funnels were reduced to two. Her military mast was removed to reduce the top-heaviness of the ship, which improved her handling in turns. Two of the 15 cm guns and all of the Maxim guns were removed, and an eleventh 8.8 cm SK L/30 gun was installed, along with three 8.8 cm SK L/35 guns. She was disarmed entirely by 1916, so that her guns could be used ashore during World War I.

== Service history ==
=== Construction and initial service ===
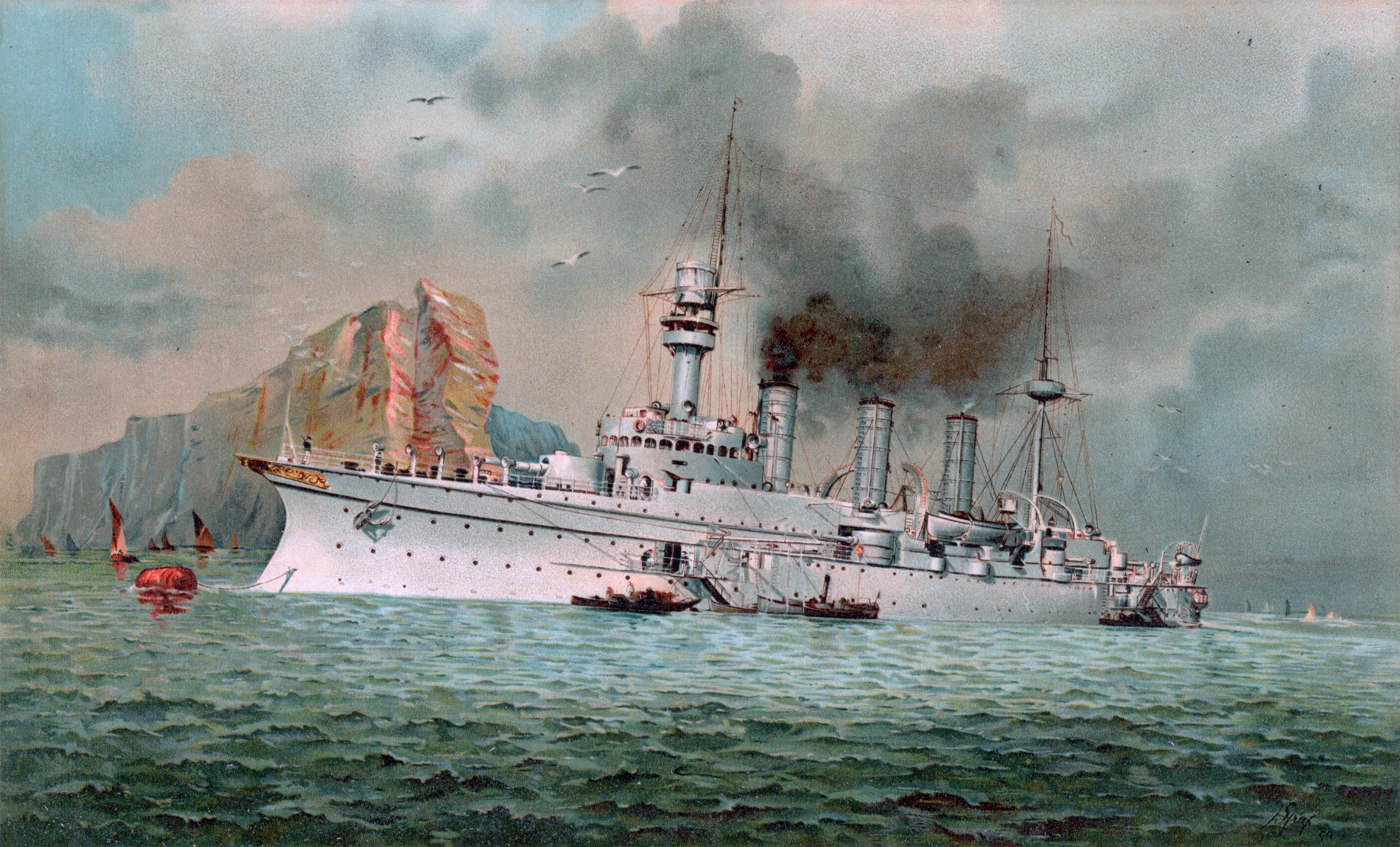
A 1902 lithograph of Hertha

Hertha, named after the earlier screw frigate Hertha, was ordered under the contract name "K". (Note: German warships were ordered under provisional names. Additions to the fleet were given a single letter; ships intended to replace older or lost vessels were ordered as "Ersatz (name of the ship to be replaced)".) She was laid down at the AG Vulcan shipyard in Stettin on 15 February 1896, though some assembly of materials had begun in workshops on 15 October 1895. She was launched on 14 April 1897, and Ludwig, the son of Luitpold, Prince Regent of Bavaria, christened the ship at the launching ceremony. Tests of the ship's steam plant began on 24 April 1898, while the ship was still incomplete. In June, Kaiser Wilhelm II came to inspect the ship; his interest stemmed in part from his role in the design process. The still unfinished ship was then moved to the Kaiserliche Werft (Imperial Shipyard) in Kiel for fitting-out work, and while there, she was lightly rammed by the ironclad Baden. The ship was commissioned into the German navy on 23 July 1898 to begin sea trials. Korvettenkapitän (Corvette Captain) Guido von Usedom was the ship's first commander. During her trials, her measured mile tests were filmed with Oskar Messter's black-and-white kinetoscope. The ship's initial testing revealed problems with her boilers, but she nevertheless was sent with the aviso Hela to escort Kaiser Wilhelm II aboard his yacht Hohenzollern on a voyage to the Mediterranean Sea.

Hertha got underway from Kiel on 18 September, stopped in Gibraltar, and arrived in Venice, Italy, on 4 October, where she met Hohenzollern and Hela. The ships then visited a number of ports in the region, including Constantinople, Jaffa, Haifa, Beirut, and Port Said in the Ottoman Empire. While in Beirut on 11 November, the unit was disbanded and Hertha was assigned to relieve the old ironclad Oldenburg in the International Squadron that had been assembled in response to the Cretan Revolt. But Hertha's boilers had suffered serious damage during the voyage, owing to design defects, and she was instead forced to go to Genoa, Italy, on 14 November at low speed for repairs. While entering the port on the night of 26–27 November, Hertha was struck by a merchant vessel that was torn from its moorings by a strong gale. The ship damaged Hertha's upper deck and tore off a boat davit. She then entered the Gio. Ansaldo & C. shipyard for repairs; while the work was ongoing, Hertha received orders to sail for the East Asia Squadron once she was ready for service again.

=== East Asia Squadron ===
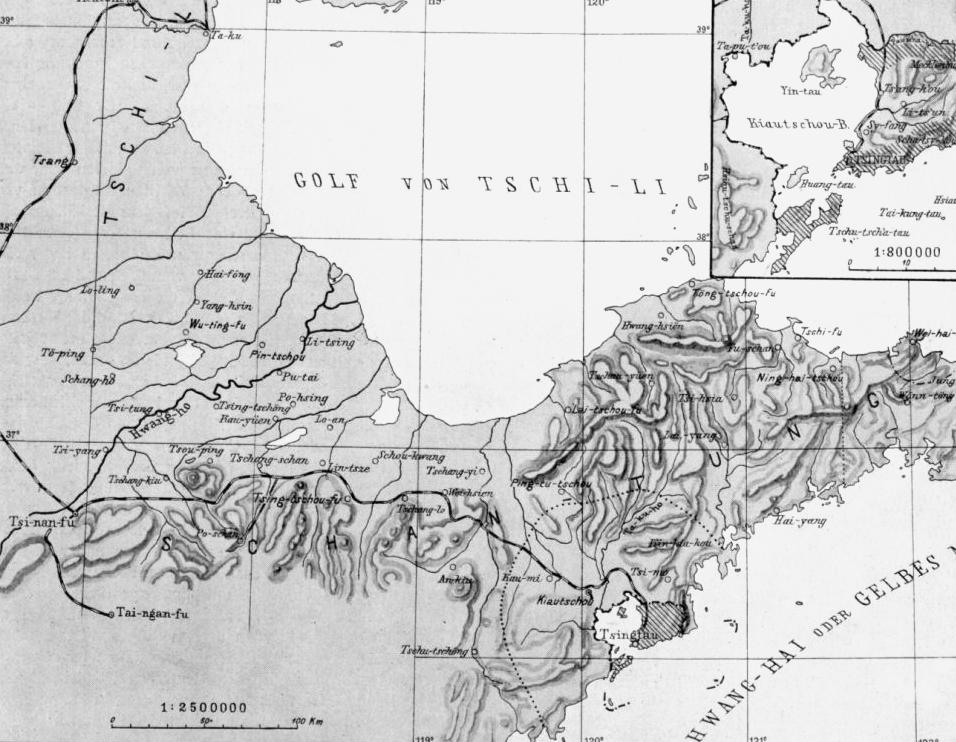
German 1912 map of the Shandong Peninsula showing the Jiaozhou Bay Leased Territory

After completing repairs, Hertha briefly conducted trials to ensure that her propulsion system was in working order before departing for East Asia on 11 April 1899. She stopped in Singapore on 21 May and arrived at Qingdao in the Jiaozhou Bay Leased Territory, Germany's colonial possession in China, on 8 June. Her arrival allowed the old ironclad Kaiser to return to Germany. At the same time, Konteradmiral (KAdm—Rear Admiral) Ernst Fritze, the deputy commander of the East Asia Squadron, temporarily made Hertha his flagship. The vessel then began a tour of the northern part of the station, sometimes cruising with other vessels of the squadron, before turning south, arriving in Amoy, China, on 2 November. There, she met her sister ship Hansa, which Fritze made his new flagship. From there, Hertha cruised to Hong Kong in company with the squadron flagship, the old ironclad Deutschland. While there, Hertha went into dry dock for maintenance that lasted three months while Deutschland left for home; the squadron commander, Vizeadmiral (Vice Admiral) Felix von Bendemann, transferred his flag to Hertha on 17 February 1900.

In early April, Hertha began a tour of Japan, where she was visited by Emperor Meiji. At that time, the East Asia Squadron consisted of Hertha, Hansa, the protected cruisers Kaiserin Augusta and Irene, and the unprotected cruiser Gefion. The five cruisers rendezvoused in Qingdao on 23 April for squadron training exercises that lasted into early May. The ships then dispersed for cruises through the region; Hertha and Gefion steamed up the Yangtze river as far as Hankou in mid-May. Later that month, the ships all returned to Qingdao. Hertha was scheduled to steam to Tianjin to take Bendemann and the German Minister to China, Clemens von Ketteler, to visit the Qing imperial court, but on 29 May, early reports of the Boxer Uprising had reached the Germans, leading them to cancel the visit.

==== Boxer Uprising ====
The Europeans in the region were not initially concerned with the unrest, but as the situation worsened, the British Vice Admiral Edward Seymour, the longest-serving vice admiral in the area, contacted the other European naval commanders and requested a meeting to discuss what measures should be taken. Bendemann ordered his squadron, less Irene, which was to remain behind to guard Qingdao, to meet the ships of the British China Station off Taku at the mouth of the Hai River. Hertha and the rest of the squadron arrived off Taku on 8 June, and Bendemann met with Seymour the next day. The two admirals did not initially agree on a course of action, owing to the lack of information about the general situation, since the telegraph line to the embassies in Beijing had been cut. Bendemann nevertheless sent a landing party of one hundred men drawn from all four of his cruisers ashore to reinforce the men in Tianjin that had been gathered from the Eight Nation Alliance, which had formed to combat the Boxers.

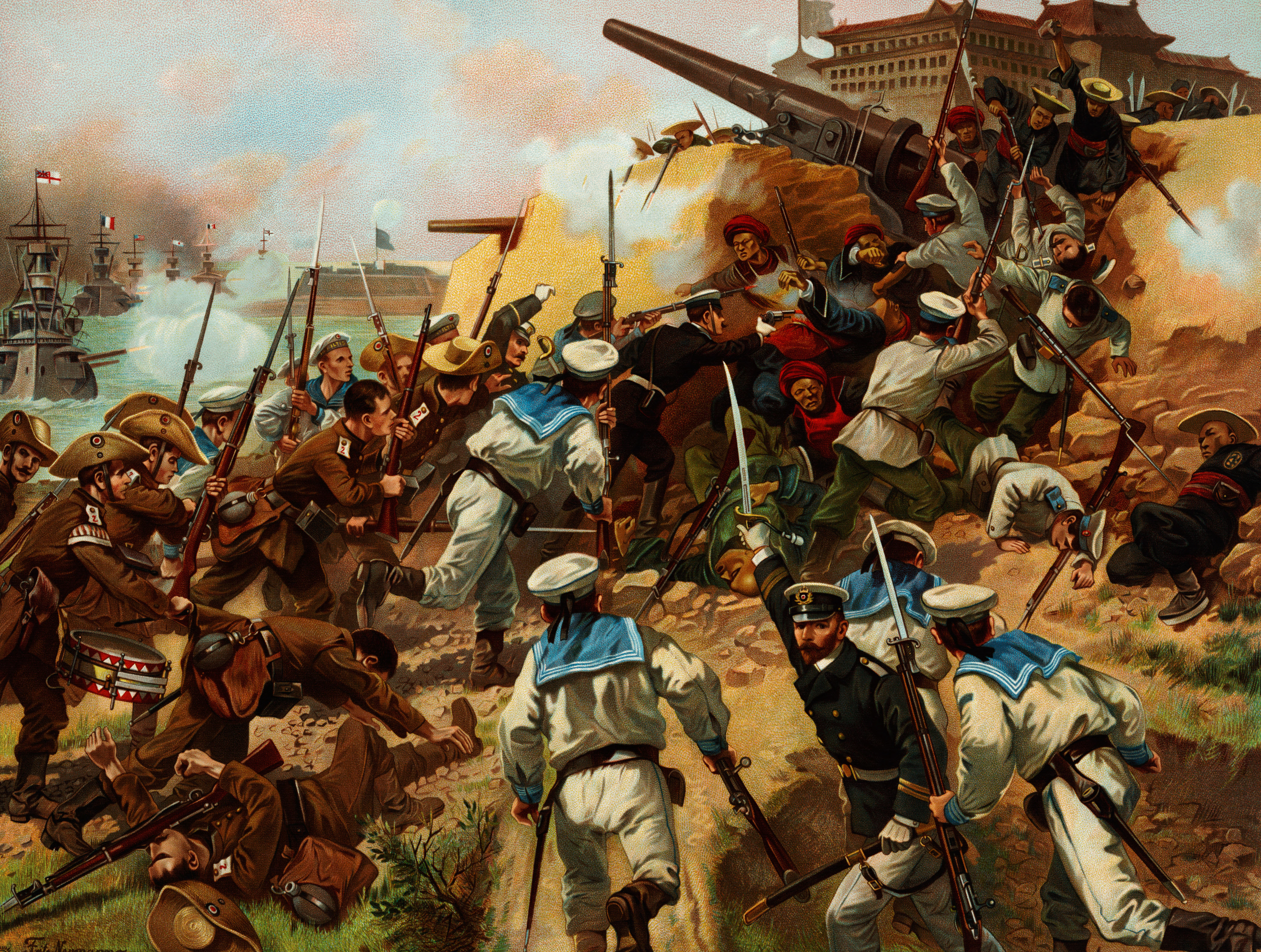
Depiction of the Battle of the Taku Forts

Shortly after midnight on 10 June, Seymour informed Bendemann of a telegram he had received informing him of the critical situation at the Legation Quarter in Beijing. Seymour decided to lead a relief force from the European ships' crews, which would march from Tianjin to Beijing to relieve the garrison there. Bendemann contributed a force of 20 officers, 2 doctors, and 487 sailors to the Seymour Expedition, about a quarter of the international force, which also included men from French, Russian, Italian, Austro-Hungarian, Japanese, and United States' warships. Hertha's contribution consisted of 4 officers and 120 sailors, led by Usedom; while the captain was ashore, the ship was commanded by the executive officer, Kapitänleutnant (KL—Captain Lieutenant) Hecht. During the expedition, Usedom replaced British Captain John Jellicoe as Seymour's chief of staff, after Jellicoe was wounded in combat. The expedition failed after encountering strong Chinese resistance from both Boxers and government soldiers. In the meantime, concerned about the situation of the expedition and having received word of Chinese reinforcements to the nearby Taku Forts, Bendemann urged action, which resulted in the Battle of the Taku Forts on 17 June. At the same time, the men who had initially gone ashore to defend Tianjin on 9 June came under repeated Chinese attacks, and further men were sent ashore; Hertha contributed another sixty men and four non-commissioned officers, led by KL Adolf von Trotha. The battered force under Seymour's command arrived back in Tianjin on 23 June and further strengthened the forces occupying the city. Fighting continued through mid-July, but by the 18th, most of the men were returned to their ships.

Following the failure of Seymour's expedition, the Eight Nation Alliance gathered forces from British India, French Indochina, the Philippines, eastern Russia, and Japan to make another attempt to march on Beijing by mid-August. Hertha and Hansa contributed 150 and 200 men, respectively, to the force, which arrived in Beijing on 18 August, having met light Chinese resistance on the way. In the meantime, the new armored cruiser Fürst Bismarck had arrived off China and on 17 August, Bendemann transferred his flag to the ship. By 5 September, reinforcements sent from Germany had arrived, allowing the landing parties from Hertha and the other vessels to be withdrawn to their ships by 15 September. The new units arrived under the command of Generalfeldmarschall (General Field Marshal) Alfred von Waldersee; Hertha embarked Waldersee in Wusong near Shanghai and carried him to Taku. Because of his experience during the campaign, Usedom was assigned to Waldersee's staff, leaving Hertha again under the command of Hecht. On 1 October, Hertha took part in the occupation of coastal fortifications at Shanhaiguan. That month, Fregattenkapitän (FK—Frigate Captain) Carl Derzewski arrived to take command of the ship. She otherwise saw little activity, spending most of her time at Qingdao and Yantai. In the course of fighting during the Boxer Uprising, Hertha had suffered seven men killed.

==== Subsequent operations ====
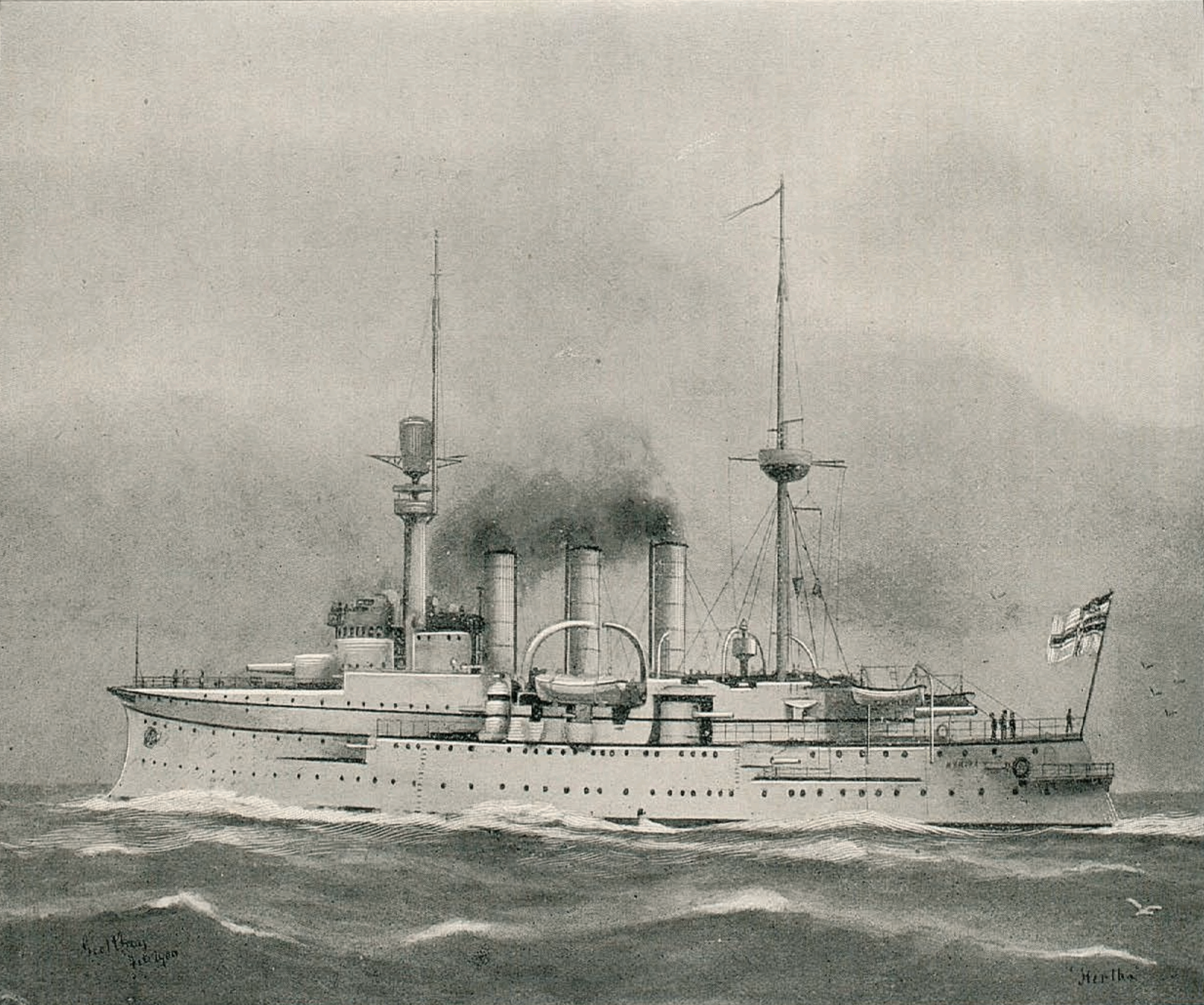
Illustration of Hertha, c. 1900

Hertha cruised off the Chinese coast through 1901. On 8 June, she once again embarked Waldersee for a visit to Kobe, Japan, that lasted until 19 June and included a meeting with Meiji. Hertha then sailed to Nagasaki, Japan, where Waldersee transferred to the hospital ship Gera, which carried him back to Germany. Hertha then returned to Qingdao, where she remained for some time before making another visit to Japan. On 21 October, Fürst Bismarck went into dry dock in Hong Kong for periodic maintenance and Bendemann temporarily returned to Hertha. The cruiser then embarked on a tour of the Dutch East Indies that lasted into 1902; she stopped in Singapore on 19 February, where VAdm Richard Geissler came aboard to replace Bendemann as the squadron commander. By that time, work on Fürst Bismarck had been completed, and she arrived in Singapore at the same time to take aboard the new commander. Hertha then steamed north to Uraga, Japan, where she was dry docked for repairs that lasted from 25 March to 5 May. After the ship reached Japan, Kapitän zur See (KzS–Captain at Sea) Friedrich von Ingenohl arrived to take command.

After completing repairs in Nagasaki, Hertha returned to Qingdao, where she remained before again visiting Japanese cities. While steaming off Formosa on 9 August, she was struck by a typhoon that caused significant flooding. KzS Malte von Schimmelmann relieved Ingenohl in November. Later that year, she visited ports in the Philippines, the Dutch East Indies, and Singapore. In early 1903, she returned to Nagasaki for another overhaul. Hertha then steamed back to Qingdao, where she lay for four months, before visiting ports in Russia, Korea, and Japan. The ship saw little activity of note in 1904, apart from a voyage up the Yangtze in company with Fürst Bismarck up to Hankou, followed by a cruise to Singapore. By the end of the year, Hertha was in need of a more thorough overhaul than could be accomplished in the shipyards available in East Asia, prompting her return to Germany. She got underway on 31 December, passing through Mahé in the Seychelles and Dar es Salaam in German East Africa. She entered the Mediterranean on 5 April, where she met Wilhelm II, who was cruising aboard Hohenzollern. The two vessels steamed together through 8 April, when Hertha continued on to home, arriving in Kiel, where she was decommissioned on 12 May.

=== Later career ===
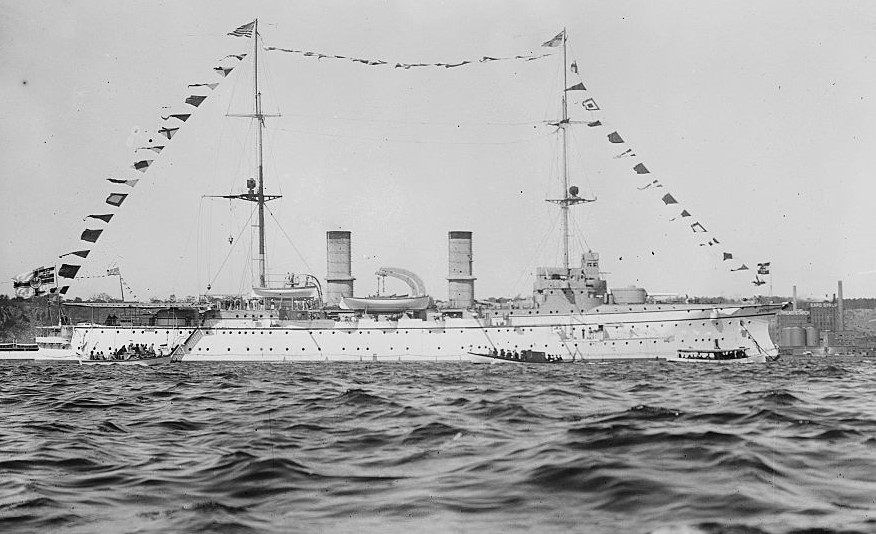
Hertha in the United States during the Hudson–Fulton Celebration

In 1906, Hertha went into the shipyard at the Kaiserliche Werft (Imperial Shipyard) in Danzig for a thorough overhaul that included replacing her boilers and alterations to her armament. The boiler uptakes were altered to vent through two funnels. The work was completed by early 1908, and she was recommissioned under the command of KzS Hugo Louran on 7 April for service as a training ship for naval cadets and apprentice seamen. From 6 to 11 June, she carried Prince Ludwig to Bornholm and then to Swinemünde. She then steamed to Bremerhaven with a class of naval cadets aboard, embarking on a training cruise abroad. She visited ports in Norway, Scotland, and Ireland before steaming south to the Mediterranean Sea, stopping in Funchal, Madeira, and Las Palmas in the Canary Islands on the way. While in the Mediterranean, she made port calls in Palma de Mallorca, Alexandria, Egypt, and several cities in Italy. She stopped in Corfu on 30 December, where she met her sister Victoria Louise. The two ships then steamed to Messina to render humanitarian assistance after an earthquake struck the area. Hertha carried some 20 t (20 long tons; 22 short tons) of food and other supplies to the city, arriving there the next day. On 1 January 1909, she embarked 120 badly injured people and evacuated them to Naples before returning to Messina the following day. Her crew went ashore and assisted with efforts to dig out people trapped in the rubble. The ship carried some 300 survivors to Naples. As thanks for the ship's assistance, Queen Elena of Italy visited the ship on 5 January and King Vittorio Emanuele III issued a daily order thanking the crew. Both cruisers anchored off Corfu the next day; Hertha began the voyage back to Germany on 21 January and arrived in Kiel on 15 March.

In April, FK Walter Engelhardt relieved Louran as the ship's commander. After taking on another group of cadets, Hertha went on a short training cruise in home waters, beginning on 5 June. On 7 August, she left Germany to visit the United States to represent Germany at the Hudson–Fulton Celebration; she joined Victoria Louise and the light cruisers Dresden and Bremen at the celebration, which took place in late September and early October. Hertha thereafter cruised in the Caribbean Sea, which included a stop in Kingston, Jamaica, from 9 to 11 January 1910, where she assisted the HAPAG steamship SS Prinz Joachim von Preussen, which had run aground there. Hertha's crew assisted in the unloading of some 300 t (300 long tons; 330 short tons) of cargo and transferring passengers to another steamer before Prinz Joachim von Preussen could be pulled free. Hertha then resumed her voyage and arrived back in Kiel on 8 March.

Hertha after her refit, probably in the United States during the Hudson–Fulton Celebration

Hertha went on another short training cruise to Norway and in the Baltic Sea in mid-1910, before departing for another extended voyage in the Mediterranean on 15 August. The cruise concluded in Kiel on 7 March 1911. In April, FK Ernst-Oldwig von Natzmer took command of the ship. A short cruise in the Baltic followed, which included a stop in Stockholm, Sweden, after which Hertha visited Norway and Scotland before returning to Wilhelmshaven, Germany. That year's long-range cruise went to the West Indies and lasted from 21 August to 11 March 1912. The annual training cruise began in early August and went to the mid-Atlantic, and included stops in the Azores and Madeira. While in Funchal, Natzmer assisted the captain of the steamer SS Lotte Menzel by arresting several sailors who had been involved in a mutiny and then transferring them to another vessel that carried them back to Germany. Hertha then steamed to Barcelona, Spain, where she received orders to join the newly created Mediterranean Division on 2 November. The unit, centered on the battlecruiser Goeben, had been sent to defend German interests during the Balkan Wars. After visiting numerous ports in the region through early 1913, Hertha was detached in mid-February and arrived back in Kiel on 7 March.

After her return, she went into dry dock for periodic maintenance. In April, FK Heinrich Rohardt became the ship's captain. Hertha departed with another crew of naval cadets on 29 May for a short training cruise to Norway that concluded in Wilhelmshaven on 3 August. Twelve days later, she got underway again for the annual overseas voyage, which went to North America and the Caribbean. While there, she received orders to go to Veracruz, Mexico, to protect German interests during the Mexican Revolution; she stayed there from 21 October to 2 November. She thereafter visited the Antilles and ultimately returned to Kiel on 13 March 1914. Hertha embarked on her final peacetime training cruise on 2 June with a contingent of 75 cadets. She steamed first in the central Baltic before visiting Norway. She then crossed the North Sea to Edinburgh, Scotland, where she stayed from 22 to 25 July; the ship was the last German vessel to visit a British port before the start of World War I.

=== World War I ===
After returning to Germany in late July, Hertha had begun preparations for the annual training cruise, but these were interrupted by the outbreak of war at the end of the month. Hertha was assigned to V Scouting Group, and was initially employed on guard duty in the western Baltic in August and September. She joined her sister Vineta and the armored cruiser Friedrich Carl for a sweep into the eastern Baltic from 24 to 26 October; the commander of V Scouting Group, KAdm Gisberth Jasper, temporarily made Hertha is flagship for the operation. The Germans' intention was to penetrate as far as the Gulf of Finland, and while ships encountered no opposition, reports of enemy submarines led Jasper to cancel the operation while off Lyserort. On 28 October, Jasper returned to his previous flagship, Hansa. By the end of 1914, however, the ships were again removed from service, owing to their vulnerability to mine and torpedo attacks.

Hertha, which had been stationed in Swinemünde, withdrew to the west on 30 October. On 16 November, she was decommissioned and thereafter disarmed and converted into a barracks ship. Based in Flensburg, she supported the crews of the seaplane base there through the end of the war. Her 21 cm guns were emplaced as a coastal artillery battery in occupied Belgium as "Battery Hertha" between Wenduine and Blankenberge. Following Germany's defeat in November 1918, Hertha was towed back to Kiel, where she was stricken from the naval register on 6 December 1919 and sold to ship-breakers in Audorf-Rendsburg. and was scrapped the following year.
