= Ernst Heinrich Toelken =

German classical scholar and archaeologist (1785–1869)

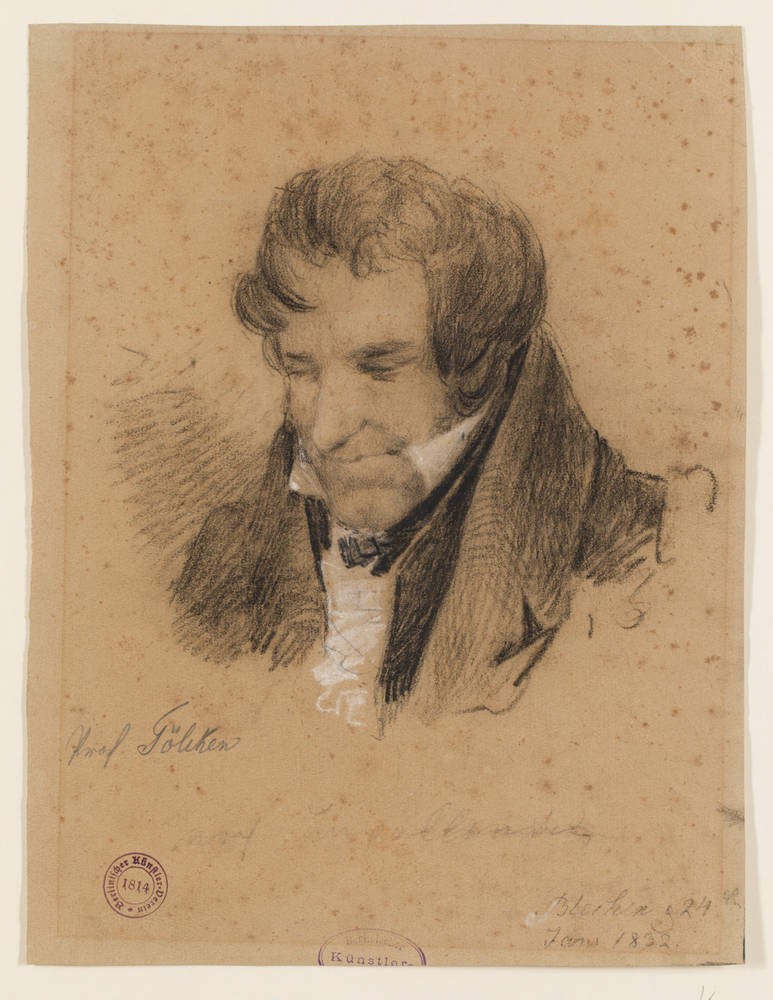
Schott by Carl Blechen (1832), Stadtmuseum Berlin (GHZ 82/69,79)

Ernst Heinrich Toelken (June 24, 1795, Bremen – January 26, 1878) was a German philosopher, Art historian and archaeologist.

== Early life ==
Toelken was born in Bremen to businessman Heinrich Toelken. He was taught at home by his parents with an emphasis on religion and culture. He was the eldest of his brothers, all of whom achieved scientific distinction. After his father died, Toelken was raised by his grandfather, businessman Ernst Trüper. Toelken went to several schools in his home town and then spent 1794–1802 at the Pädagogium, graduating with honours. Toelken continued his education privately, studying French, English and Italian under several teachers. He taught himself ancient Greek and studied spherical trigonometry under Gottfried Reinhold Treviranus.

On 25 April 1804, Toelken matriculated in the theological faculty of Georgia Augusta at Göttingen. He shifted focus, opting for history, philosophy and philology, though still linking them back to theology. With his mother's approval, he spent the autumn of his first semester taking the first of his characteristic trips, this time through Germany and Switzerland, of which trip he noted: "idque pene totum pedibus confeci". On returning to Göttingen, he resumed his studies, spending a year under professor Thibaut studying the Analysis of finite and infinite sizes, later stating, "Scientist quoque naturae indagatries, physicam et chemicam paululum attigi." His studies in ancient and recent history became more and more significant. At the midpoint of his study at Göttingen, he studied under Herbart. Toelken, also a member of Herbart's secret society:

viri singularis, cujus in me officia et amicitiam laudibus nunquam satis prosequi potero.

Translation: "The man of a singular, of which we can never sufficiently praise of friendship done me many kindnesses, and is able to."

Herbart had many talented students who combined philological and pedagogic interests characteristic of the New Humanists, including Ernst Karl Friedrich Wunderlich, Georg Ludolf Dissen, and Friedrich Thiersch.

=== Career ===
He was a member of the Gesetzlose Gesellschaft zu Berlin, a society founded in Berlin in 1809 in the aftermath of the Battle of Jena-Auerstedt, to press for the reform of Prussian government and society.

He and Osiander were rare among the private instructors of their time because they were able to undertake foreign travel and a grand tour. At age 30 he became professor of Art History at Berlin University. He was tutor to Franz Woepcke during his maths dissertation there. He was appointed director of the Antiquarium, or Cabinet of Antiquities at the Berlin Museum in 1832, and became its vice-president.

A set of 419 plaster impressions of Prince Stanisław Poniatowski's (1754–1833) gem collection was presented to the King of Prussia by the prince (they now form the Daktyliothek Poniatowski in Berlin). They were shown to Toelken in 1832, where he was the first to doubt that the original gems were ancient, noticing that (from the known signatures of Graeco-Roman engravers) the signatures on these gems suggested that engravers working centuries apart were producing gems that were impossibly identical in style, and stating "Thus, we have here, -- and I am extremely sorry to give this hard judgement! -- in works and words a scientific deceit of such dimensions never seen in art history before." He did, however, judge their classical style with great admiration, and commented that the impressions were "indeed the most beautiful you can expect to see in art".

As a secretary of the Prussian Academy of Arts, he was co-signatory and co-author of an 1844 letter of thanks from it to the composer.

== Works ==
- Erklärung der Bildwerke am Tempel des Jupiter Ammon zu Siwah ... Diese Bogen, nebst den beiligenden drei Steindrücken, gehören zu der von dem Verfasser herauszugebenden "Reise zum Tempel des Jupiter Ammon in Libyen und nach Oberägypten von Sr. Excellenz dem Herrn General-Lieutenant Freiherr von Minutoli." Berlin, A. Rücker, 1823.
- Reise zum Tempel des Jupiter Ammon in der Lybischen Wüste .. in den Jahren 1820 und 1821. Von Heinrich Freiherr von Minutoli ... Nach den Tagebüchern ... herausgegeben von Dr. E.H. Toelken (Berlin, Rücker, 1824; a supplement volume appeared in 1827) - on the Prussian army officer, Heinrich Baron von Minutoli's trip to Egypt in 1820 and the Siwa Oasis in 1821 as leader of a scientific mission, on which Minutoli amassed an important collection of antiquities which Aloys Hirt visited enthusiastically in 1823; the collection was eventually sold in Paris with a large part acquired by the Berlin Museum of which Toelken was a curator.
