= Guido von Usedom =

German admiral (1854–1925)

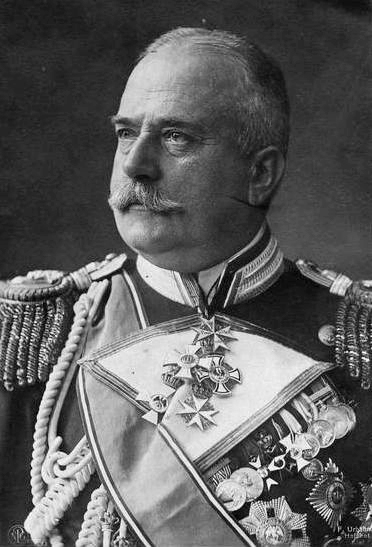
- Born: 2 October 1854; Quanditten, East Prussia, Kingdom of Prussia
- Died: 24 February 1925 (aged 70); Schwerin, Free State of Mecklenburg-Schwerin, Weimar Republic
- Military career
- Allegiance: German Empire; Ottoman Empire
- Branch: Imperial German Navy; Ottoman Navy
- Service years: 1871–1918 (German Navy); 1914–1918 (Ottoman Navy)
- Rank: Admiral; Mushir
- Conflicts: Boxer Rebellion: Battle of Langfang; World War I: Dardanelles Campaign
- Awards: Pour le Mérite with oak leaves

Guido von Usedom (2 October 1854 – 24 February 1925) was a German admiral who served in the Boxer Rebellion and World War I. His most notable service was in the Dardanelles Campaign.

== Biography ==
=== Early years ===
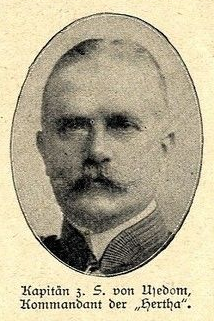
Von Usedom in 1900

Guido came from the Pomeranian noble family Usedom and was the son of Lieutenant Kuno von Usedom (1804–1855). He joined the Imperial German Navy on 31 May 1871. After his training and his first tours of duty on board, he was given his first command. For a time he served as adjutant to Prince Henry of Prussia.

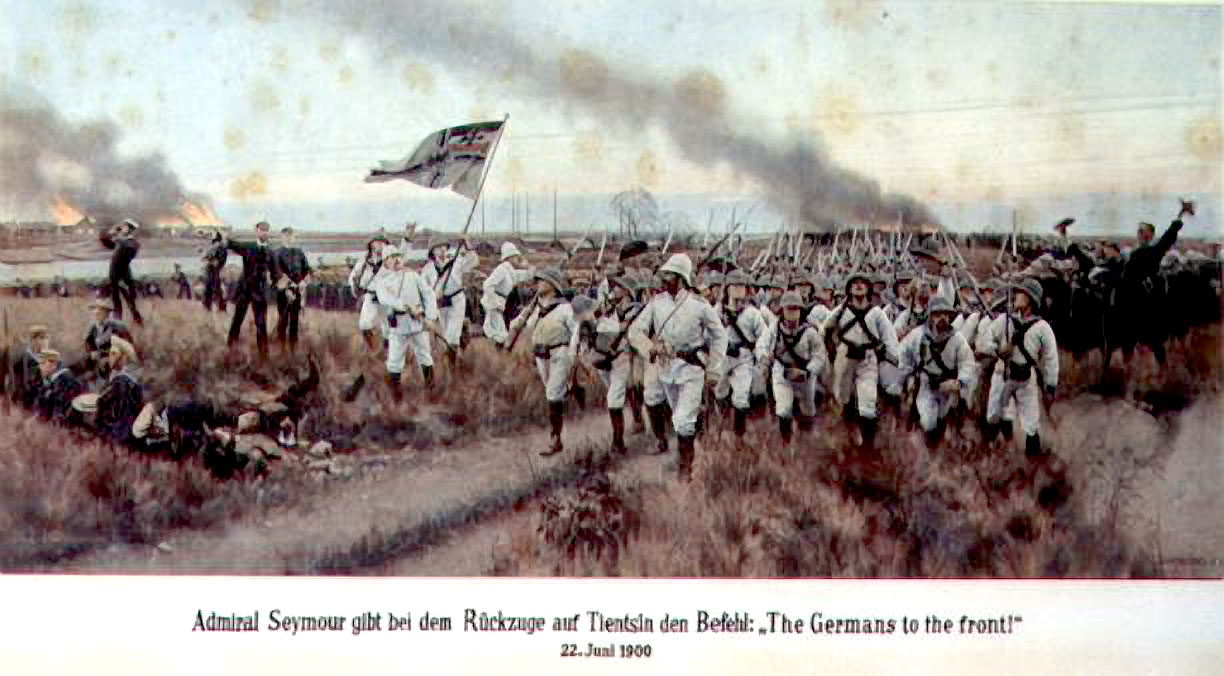
The German expeditionary force under Usedom's leadership

In October 1895, Usedom, with the rank of Korvettenkapitän (Lieutenant Commander), was in command of the aviso (dispatch vessel) Pfeil until the end of the year, and from March 1896 he was in command of the aviso SMS Jagd for six months. From September 1896 to July 1898 he was in command of the coastal defence ship SMS Hagen and was made a Senior Korvettenkapitän during this time. He then took command of the large cruiser SMS Hertha, which had just been put into service, on which he was promoted to the new rank of Fregattenkapitän (Commander). He was eventually promoted to the rank of Kapitän zur See (Captain) on 18 September 1899.

=== The Boxer Rebellion ===
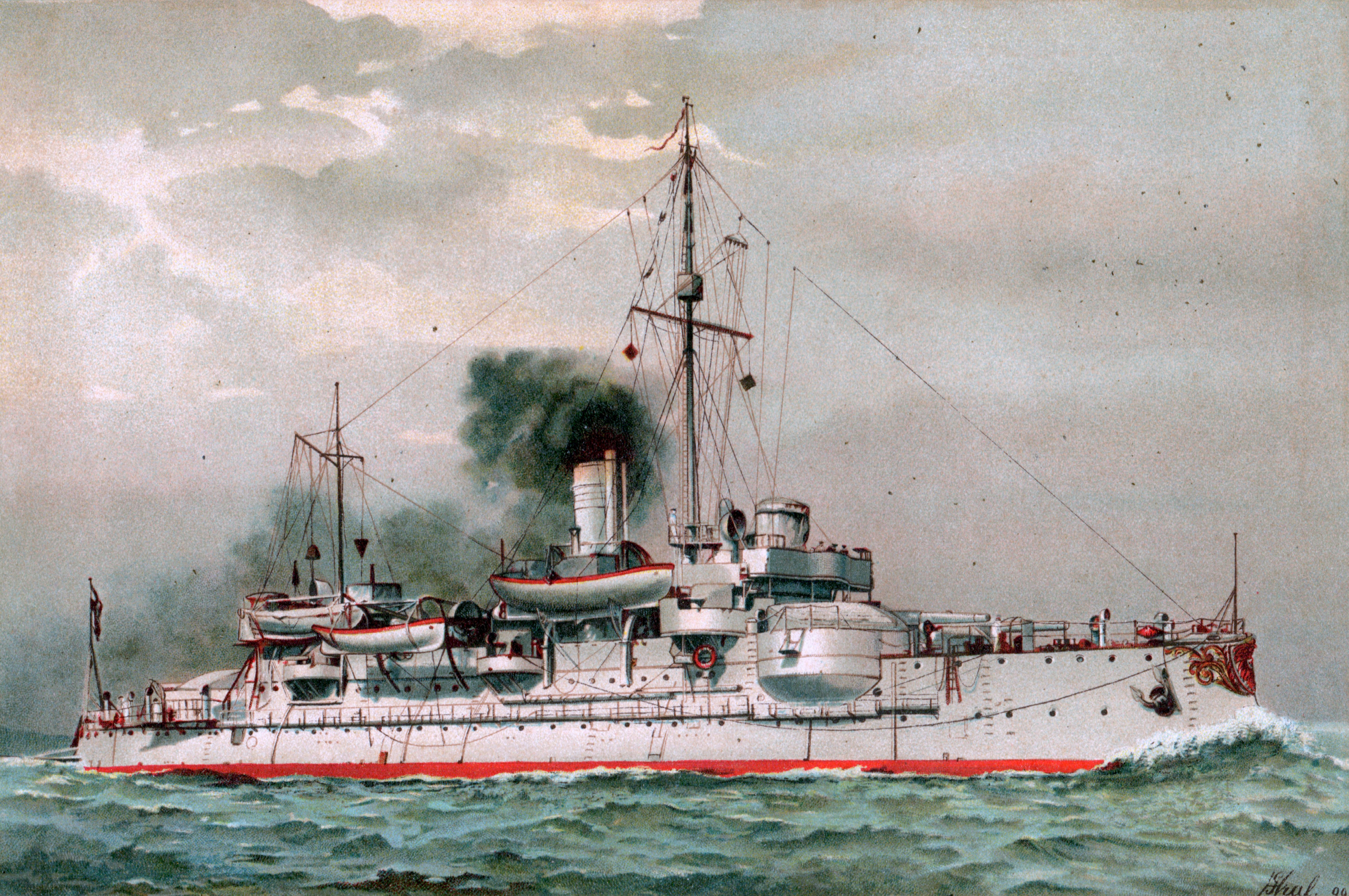
Coastal armored ship Hagen

Usedom was deployed with Hertha in the Mediterranean and East Asia. At the beginning of the Boxer Rebellion, the commander of the East Asia Squadron, Vice Admiral Felix von Bendemann, ordered a landing corps to be formed from the crews of all German cruisers to help protect the European embassies in Beijing. Usedom became the leader of the entire German expeditionary force of around 500 men, which was subordinate to the British commander of the foreign armed forces involved, Vice Admiral Edward Seymour. Usedom simultaneously served as its chief of staff.

On 10 June 1900 the entire expeditionary force left Tanggu by rail for Beijing. The advance was stopped by Chinese troops and insurgents, so that the expeditionary force had to withdraw by land. The commander of the British landing corps, Captain John Jellicoe, who later became the commander of the Grand Fleet in the Battle of Jutland, was wounded. In this distressed situation, Seymour requested the use of the German troops under Usedom and is said to have spoken the historical phrase "The Germans to the Front".

Due to his experience with the landing corps, Usedom was released from the leadership of Hertha in September 1900 and assigned to the staff of the commander-in-chief of the allied troops in China, which enforced the end of the uprising. Parallel to this task, he had already been formally appointed as wing adjutant to the emperor on 21 July 1900. On 5 April 1902 Usedom was awarded the Pour le Mérite for his achievements in China.

=== Before the First World War ===
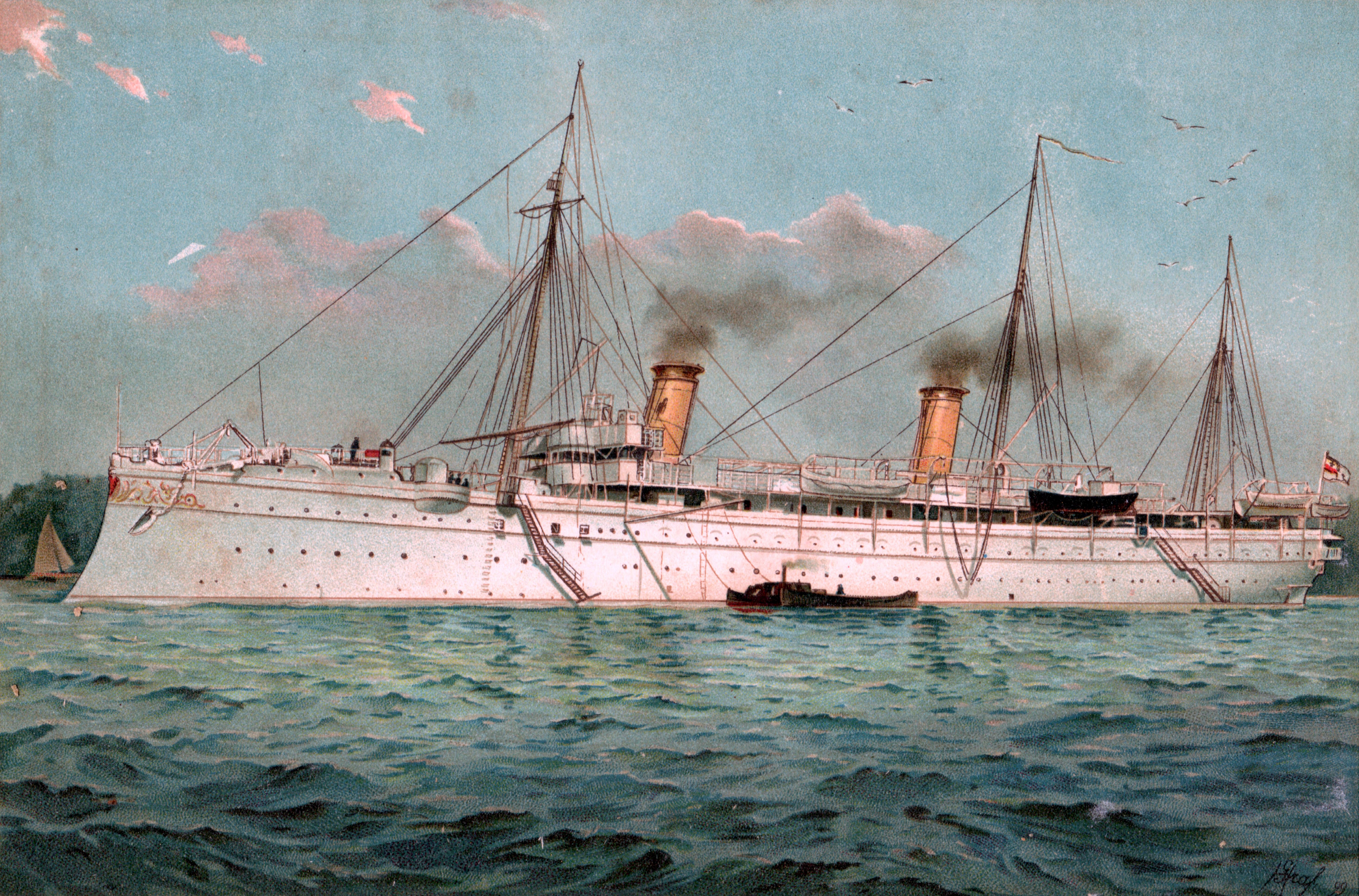
Yacht Hohenzollern

In August 1902, Usedom took command of the imperial yacht SMY Hohenzollern, which he held until October 1904. He then became Inspector of the I. Marine Inspection and in this capacity was promoted to Rear Admiral on 14 March 1905. At the same time he was from September 1905 the deputy director, and from January 1906 director, of the Imperial Shipyard Kiel. On 21 August 1908 he was promoted to Vice Admiral and with his retirement at the end of 1910 was given the character of Admiral.

=== Head of the Sonderkommando Turkey during World War I ===
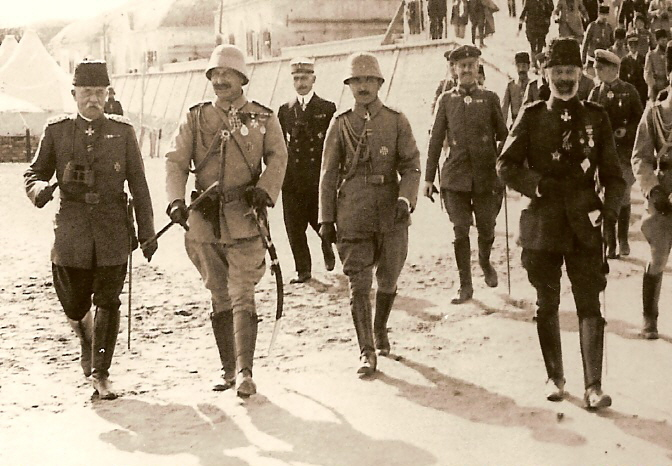
Usedom (far left) as an admiral in Turkish uniform accompanies Kaiser Wilhelm II and Enver Pasha across the battlefield of Gallipoli. On the far right the delegate of the fleet command and commander of all floating equipment in Çanakkale, Vice Admiral Johannes Merten.

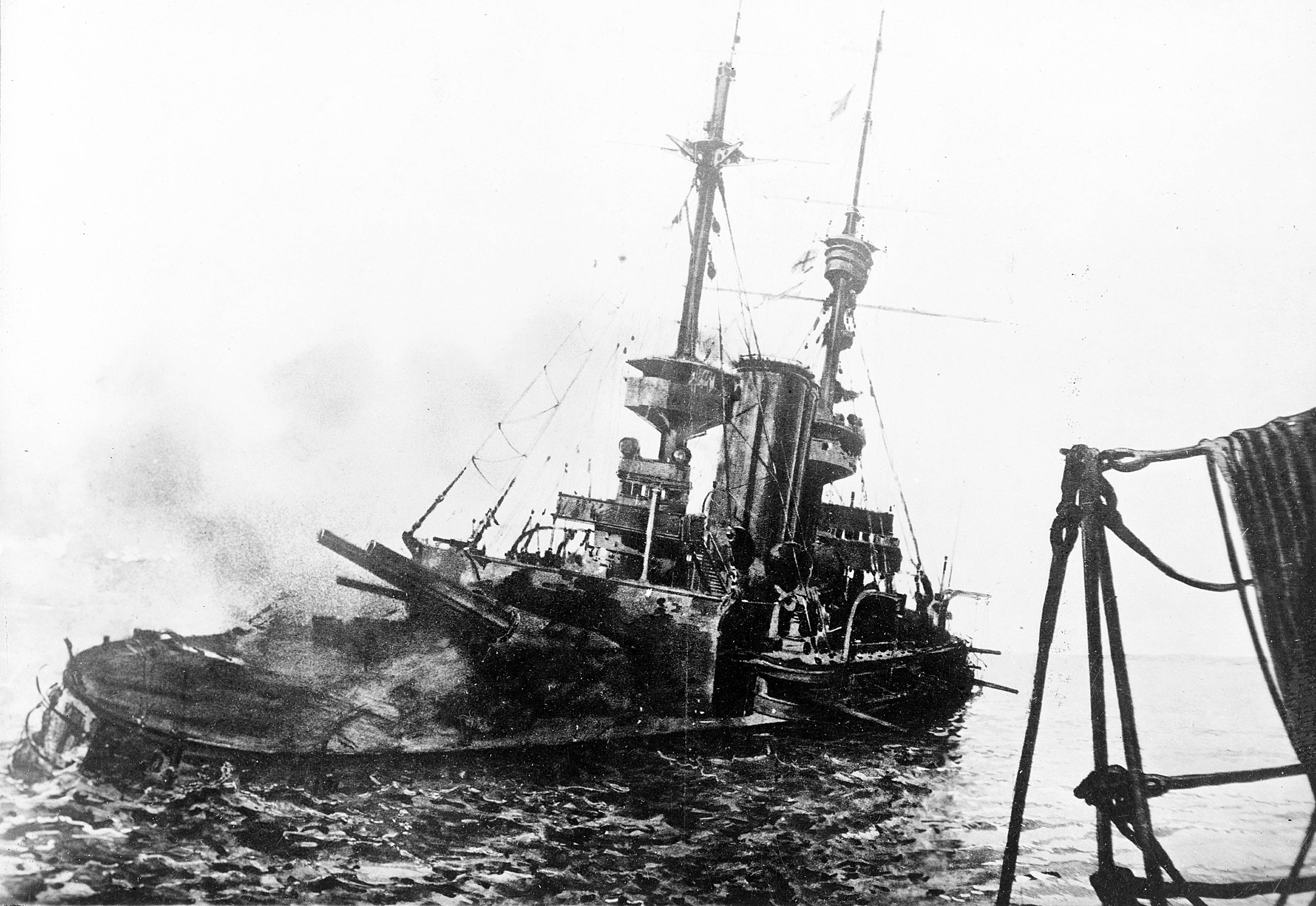
The British battleship Irresistible sinks after a mine hit in the Dardanelles

In August 1914, with the outbreak of World War I, Usedom was reactivated and sent to Constantinople as head of the Special Command Turkey. Because of increasing signs for a Triple Entente operation against the Dardanelles, and thus the risk of a siege and eventually fall of the capital of the Ottoman Empire, increased Usedom was seconded to the Ottoman Navy. Given the rank of Mushir, he was appointed Commander-in-Chief of the Straits.

Having extremely limited resources, Usedom expanded his coastal positions while having inadequate garrisons in the forts further inland. By mid-February 1915, Usedom managed to man the heavy artillery in the most important forts along the straits and to lay extensive minefields in the straits. The French battleship Bouvet and the British battleships Irresistible and Ocean were sunk by these mines in the course of the Dardanelles campaign.

The further course of the beginning Battle of Gallipoli was determined less by Usedom than by the leadership of the Turkish land forces in form of the German general Otto Liman von Sanders. Usedom was awarded the Oak Leaves to his Pour le Mérite in August 1915, and after the campaign had ended remained in Turkey and in Ottoman service. In January 1916 he also received substantive promotion to Admiral. He retired on 26 November 1918.

== Literature ==
- Dermot Bradley (eds.), Hans H. Hildebrand, Ernest Henriot: Deutschlands Admirale 1849–1945. The military careers of naval, engineering, medical, weapons and administrative officers in the rank of admiral. Band 3: P–Z. Biblio Verlag, Osnabrück 1990, ISBN 3-7648-1700-3, S. 473–475.
- Hans H. Hildebrand, Albert Röhr, Hans-Otto Steinmetz: Die deutschen Kriegsschiffe. Band 3, 1. Auflage, Herford 1981, ISBN 3-7822-0211-2.
