= Ludwig von Wolzogen =

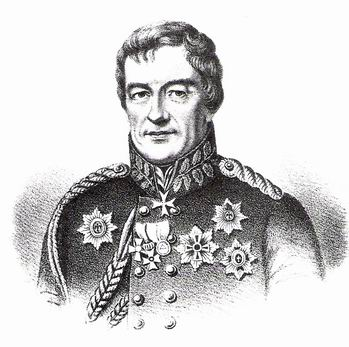
- Born: 4 February 1773; Meiningen, Duchy of Saxe-Meiningen
- Died: 4 July 1845 (aged 72); Berlin, Kingdom of Prussia
- Burial place: Invalid's Cemetery
- Military career
- Allegiance: (Kingdom of Württemberg) Württemberg (1792 - 1794, 1804 - 1807) (Kingdom of Prussia) Prussia (1794 – 1804, 1814–1836) (Russia) Russian Empire (1807 – 1814)
- Service years: 1792 - 1836
- Rank: General of the Infantry
- Conflicts: War of the Third Coalition; French invasion of Russia; War of the Sixth Coalition
- Awards: Order of St. Anna, 1st class Pour le Mérite; Order of the Sword; Order of the White Falcon; Order of the Red Eagle, 1st class Order of Leopold; Service Award Cross; Order of St. Vladimir; Gold Sword for Bravery

Justus Philipp Adolf Wilhelm Ludwig Freiherr von Wolzogen (4 February 1773 – 4 July 1845) was a Württembergian military officer, who served during the Napoleonic Wars.

== Biography ==
=== Early life ===
Wolzogen's father, Ernst Ludwig Freiherr von Wolzogen (1723–1774), was a diplomat who served the Duke of Saxe-Hildburghausen. Both his parents died when he was an infant, and he entered the Karlsschule Stuttgart military school in 1781, at the age of eight. He joined the 1st Battalion of the Guards at the Army of Württemberg in 1792. In 1794, after being commissioned as a second lieutenant, he was transferred to the Hügel Infantry Regiment. Shortly afterwards, he entered the Prussian Army's Hohenlohe Regiment as an ensign, hoping to participate in the War of the First Coalition against Napoleon; before he had a chance to be sent to the field, the Peace of Basel ended hostilities between the states. While in Prussia, he met Gerhard von Scharnhorst and became a member of his Military Society, a club of like-minded officers who discussed military affairs.

Wolzogen was also entrusted with the education of young Duke Eugen of Württemberg in 1801. In 1804, he returned to Württemberg and was promoted to major. In November 1805, he was the deputy quartermaster general of the Württembergian detachment, commanded by Honoré Charles Reille, which took part in the War of the Third Coalition. In 1806, he attended the wedding of Catharina of Württemberg and Jérôme Bonaparte. On 6 October, he was given the rank of lieutenant colonel, and appointed commander of the Foot Guards.

=== In Russia ===
Wolzogen attempted to rejoin the Prussian Army. His resignation from his post in Württemberg was accepted on 16 May 1807, but the Prussians refused his offer. Instead, he used his connections with Duke Eugen and was given the office of a staff officer in the Imperial Russian Army, which he entered on 23 September. During the following years, he compiled several scholarly works. On 14 June 1812 he was promoted to colonel, and assigned to the headquarters of Michael Andreas Barclay de Tolly. As such, he served during the French invasion of Russia. In early 1813, Alexander I of Russia appointed him as one of his adjutants in the War of the Sixth Coalition. During the Battle of Leipzig, he noted the precarious disposition of the reserves of Karl Philipp, Prince of Schwarzenberg, and hastened to warn his superiors. In recognition of this, he was promoted to major-general. He was later appointed chief of staff in the III Corps under Karl August, Grand Duke of Saxe-Weimar-Eisenach.

=== Post-war years ===
On 5 May 1814 he resigned from the Russian Army, and after attending the Congress of Vienna, was given the rank of a major-general in the Prussian Army on 24 May. He was a member of the commission which reorganized the Prussian Cadet Corps, and was responsible for the military education of the future Wilhelm I. He also joined the reformatory Gesetzlose Gesellschaft zu Berlin. In 1818, he was sent by Frederick William III of Prussia to serve as his country's plenipotentiary in the Military Commission of the German Confederation, which directed the union's armed forces. He remained in this position until his retirement, at the rank of general, on 12 March 1836. In 1820, he married Dorothea Therese Emilie von Lilienberg (1797–1872), with whom he fathered three sons and two daughters.

Wolzogen is remembered today mainly for his wartime memoirs, as well as for his brief appearance in Leo Tolstoy's War and Peace.

== Sources ==
- "Вольцоген, Людвиг-Юстус-Филипп-Адольф-Вильгельм" . Brockhaus and Efron Encyclopedic Dictionary (in Russian). 1906.
