= Aloys Hirt =

German art historian and archaeologist

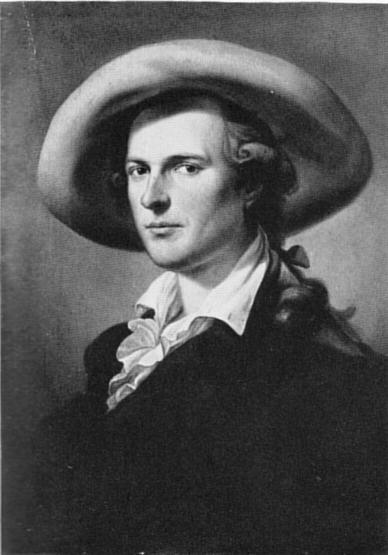
Portrait by Friedrich Georg Weitsch, 1785

Aloys Hirt (27 June 1759 – 29 June 1837) was a German art historian and archaeologist of Ancient Greek and Roman architecture. He was responsible for the King of Prussia's antiquities collection from 1798, and became the University of Berlin's first professor of art theory and art history in 1810.

== Life ==
Hirt was born in the village of Behla near Hüfingen in the Swabian Baar region. The son of a wealthy rural family, he was able to attend secondary school (Gymnasium) at Villingen, educated by Benedictine monks. After the death of his first love, he entered a monastery for a while, before studying philosophy at the University of Nancy. Intending to get a degree in law and political science, he briefly studied it at the University of Freiburg soon afterwards. However, in 1779, he switched university to Vienna and subject to classics, staying 3 years.

=== Italy ===
In 1782 he moved to Rome and went on to live in Italy until 1796, visiting Venice, Florence, Naples, and Sicily. Hirt became increasingly interested in art after reading Johann Winckelmann's works and being exposed to wide variety of art available for study in Italy. He worked as an archaeologist and from 1785 also as an established and knowledgeable cicerone (tour guide). His clients included Goethe, Friedrich Wilhelm von Erdmannsdorff, Margravine Louise of Brandenburg-Schwedt, Prince Nikolaus II Esterházy, Herder, Duchess Anna Amalia of Brunswick-Wolfenbüttel, and the countess Wilhelmine von Lichtenau.

Hirt also assimilated with the German expatriate community in Rome. Also in Rome, in 1791, he published a treatise on the Pantheon, Osservazioni istorico-architettoniche sopra il Panteon. In 1794 the received the title of a Princely Weimarian Councillor.

=== Berlin ===
His time in Italy ended with the onset of the Napoleonic Wars in 1796, when he was called to the Prussian Academy of Sciences and the Academy of Arts in Berlin. Raised to a Royal Prussian Councillor, he taught the "theory of art", and became an arts advisor to King Frederick William II, presumably with the patronage of Countess Lichtenau.

In 1797, he made a public lecture outlining plans for a public museum in Berlin to contain the finest Prussian art treasures arranged by artistic 'school' for the edification of the art lover and public. The proposal were green-lighted by King Frederick William II and given royal patronage, which continued with his successor Frederick William III. Hirt settled on a site Unter den Linden (where today stands Schinkel's Neue Wache) and produced an initial design, revolutionary in its use of shutters to control light. This, however, was never built, with the start of construction being delayed by Napoleon's conquest of Europe and shelved indefinitely by his decisive victory over the Prussians in 1806 and the punitive Treaty of Tilsit. Nevertheless, Hirt's ideas would take shape much later with the inauguration of the Altes Museum, the nucleus of present-day Museum Island

=== Professor and lecturer ===
With the museum postponed, Hirt published his seminal Die Baukunst nach den Grundsätzen der Alten in 1809, arguing for Neoclassicism in modern architecture and becoming one of the movements dominant texts. In the same year, he joined the Gesetzlose Gesellschaft zu Berlin intellectual society. In 1810, the art trader Christian von Mechel, who had reorganized what artworks were left in the palace of Sanssouci after French forces had plundered it, reminded King Frederick William III of the project to create an art museum in Berlin.

1810 also marked the foundation of the University of Berlin, with Hirt asked to be its first professor of art history and of archaeology. His students there and at the Bauakademie he had helped to establish included a whole generation of German classicizing architects - such as Christian Daniel Rauch, Karl Friedrich Schinkel (who he knew from his time at the Academy of Sciences and Arts), and Friedrich Weinbrenner. Weinbrenner went on to evangelize Hirt's architectural classicism at his own new architecture school at Karlsruhe, Baden.

=== Under attack ===
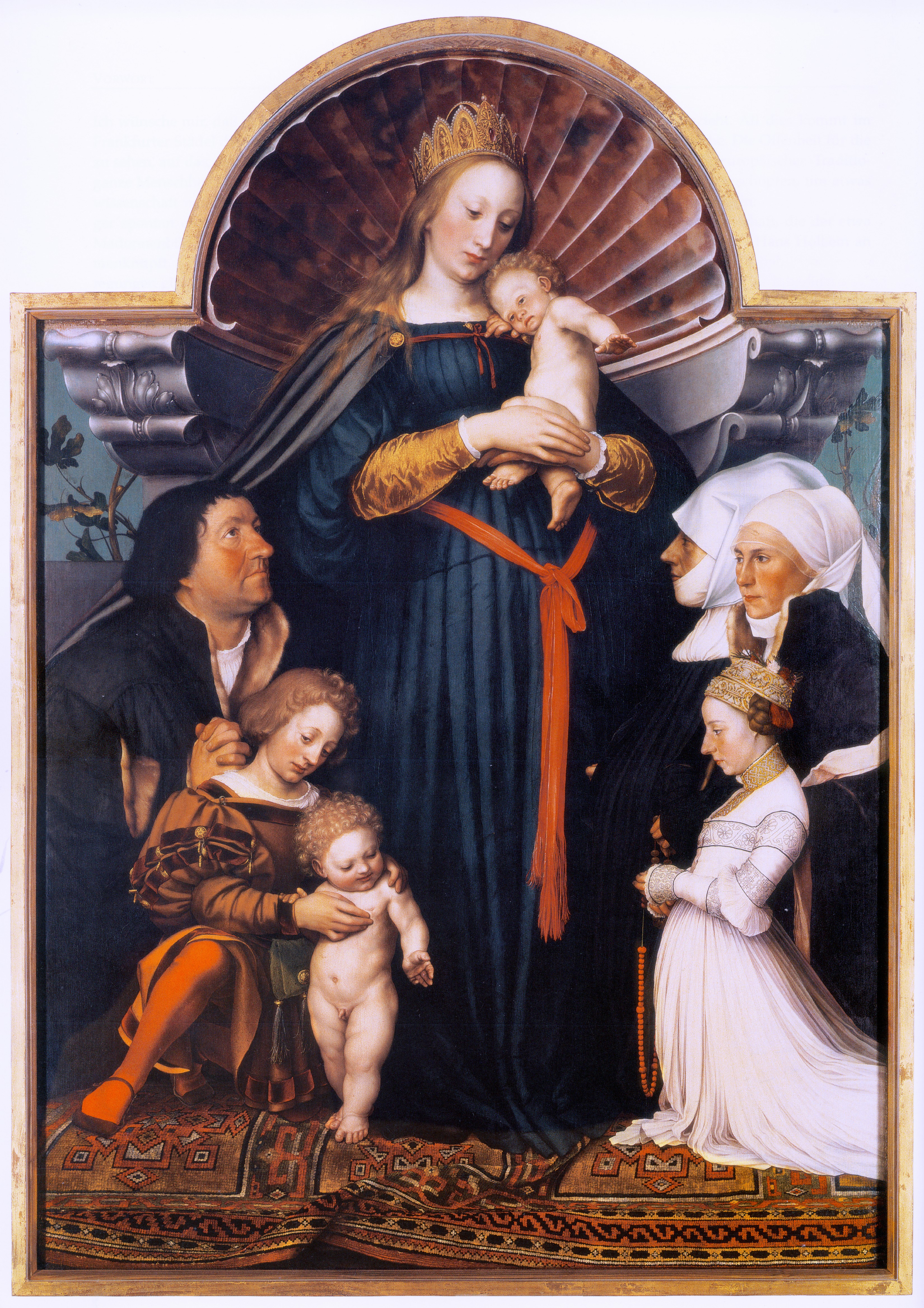
Darmstadt Madonna

In 1815 the Prussian works appropriated by Napoleon to create a museum in Paris telling a comprehensive history of art were returned and put on public display at the Akademie der Wissenschaft, seen by Friederich Wilhelm himself. Impressed by Napoleon's short-lived universalist notion, Friederich set about forming one in Berlin. Hirt was a member on the committee ordered by Friedrich for this purpose, but suffered criticism from young art history students like Karl Ruhmohr and Gustav Waagen.

From the 1820s Hirt'ss views and methods had increasingly become seen as too subjective and unscientific, though he retained influence at court. Waagen had studied the stolen works of Prussia in Paris and come to the conclusion that an art museum's prime focus was not national prestige or education, as Hirt argued, but the pleasure of viewing art. Waagen's 1828 pamphlet gave a detailed account of this competition, and asserted that quality (i.e. only the better or more representative artworks of each era) not quantity (i.e. all the state's works) should be displayed. Disagreeing, Hirt in the end left the committee.

Hirt's architectural stance on neo-classicism was also under attack, principally by Heinrich Hübsch (1795–1863), a student of in Weinbrenner's from Karlsruhe, who laid the foundations in his 1828 book "In welchem Style sollen Wir bauen?" (In What Style Should We Build?) for new revivals of post-classical styles.

=== Later life ===
In 1830, he examined the Berlin (later Darmstadt) version of Hans Holbein the younger's "Bürgermeister Meyer Madonna", now known to be the original. His opinion came to be part of the body of critical opinion considered in the so-called "Holbein convention" held in 1871. With his health failing, in the 1830s he withdrew increasingly out of the public life.

== Reception ==
Hirt was one of the first to hang paintings in historical order, an idea he may have drawn from the installation at the Imperial Gallery in Vienna. His "Geschichte der Baukunst bei der Alten" was instrumental for the classical revival in Germany and Europe. Goethe featured Hirt in his 1799 novella "Der Sammler und die Seinigen".

Despite ignominiously departing from the Museum committee, the 1823–30 building designed by his student Schinkel, known as the Altes Museum, was as much the product of Hirt's efforts as of Waagen's.

== Works ==
- Die Geschichte der Baukunst bei der Alten. 3 vols. Berlin: G. Reimer, 1821–1827
- Die Geschichte der bildenden Künste bei den Alten. Berlin: Duncker und Humblot, 18331833
- Bilderbuch für Mythologie, Archäologie und Kunst. 2 vols. Berlin: In Commission bey I. D. Sander, 1805–1816
- Der Tempel der Diana zu Ephesus. Berlin: J. F. Weiss, 1809
- Die Baukunst nach den Grundsätzen der Alten. Berlin: In der Realschulbuchhandlung, 1809
- Osservazioni istorico-architettoniche sopra il Panteon. Rome: Pagliarini, 1791
- Kunstbemerkungen auf einer Reise über Wittenberg und Meissen nach Dresden und Prag. Berlin: Verlag von Duncker & Humblot, 1830
- Die Lehre der Gebäude bei den Griechen und Römern. Berlin: Reimer, 1827
- Von den ägyptischen Pyramiden überhaupt, und von ihrem Baue insbesondere. Berlin: G. C. Nauck, 1815
- Heinrich Hübsch über griechische Baukunst, dargestellt. Berlin: s.n., 1823
- "Ueber die Baue Herodes des Grossen überhaupt, und über seinen Tempelbau zu Jerusalem ins besondere." Akademie der Wissenschaften, Berlin. Historisch-philologische Klasse. (1816–17): 1-24
- "Ueber die Bildung des Nackten bei den Alten." Abhandlungen der Königlichen Akademie der Wissenschaften in Berlin 7 (1820–21): 289-304
- "Ueber die Gegenstände der Kunst bei den Aegyptern." Abhandlungen der Königlichen Akademie der Wissenschaften in Berlin 7 (1820–21):115-174.
