= Franz Woepcke =

German orientalist and mathematician (1826–1864)

Franz Woepcke (6 May 1826 – 25 March 1864) was a German historian, Orientalist and mathematician. He is remembered for publishing editions and translations of medieval Arabic mathematical manuscripts and for his research on the propagation of the Hindu-Arabic numeral system in the medieval era.

Woepcke was born in Dessau in Germany. He studied mathematics at the University of Berlin, gaining his doctorate in 1847. With astronomer Johann Franz Encke and archaeologist Ernst Heinrich Tölken as his academic advisors, he penned his dissertation involving sundials of antiquity (Archaeologico-mathematicae circa solaria veterum). Afterwards he studied Arabic language at the University of Bonn, where in 1850 he obtained his habilitation. Woepcke spent much of his subsequent career studying and working outside of Germany, particularly in Paris. Most of his output was written in French. In 1856 he returned to Berlin and taught classes at the Französischen Gymnasium until 1858. He died in Paris on March 25, 1864 at the age of 37.

Among his better known works are: an edition of the algebra book of Omar Khayyám (died c. 1131) (L'algèbre d'Omar Alkhayyâmî, publiée, traduite et accompagnée d'extraits des manuscrits inédits, 1851); an edition of the algebra book of Al-Karkhi (died c. 1029) (Extrait du Fakhrî, traité d'algèbre par Mohammed Alkarkhi, précédé d'un mémoire sur l'algèbre indéterminée chez les Arabes, 1853); lengthy essays on the introduction and propagation of the Hindu-Arabic numerals (Sur l'introduction de l'arithmetique indienne en Occident (1859) and Mémoire sur la propagation des chiffres indiens (1863)); and essays involving the influences of Arabic sources in the mathematics of Leonardo Pisano (died c. 1250).

Hippolyte Taine dedicated his book De l'intelligence to him and described him as his friend that he had most respected.
