= Gesetzlose Gesellschaft zu Berlin =

Organization founded in 1809

The Gesetzlose Gesellschaft zu Berlin (literally, the 'Berlin Lawless Society' because it had no internal rules) is a social society founded in Berlin in 1809 in the aftermath of the Battle of Jena-Auerstedt to press for the reform of Prussian government and society.

Among its prominent members were Ernst von Pfuel, Ernst Heinrich Toelken, Felix von Bendemann, and Ludwig von Wolzogen.
