= Felix von Bendemann =

German admiral (1848–1915)

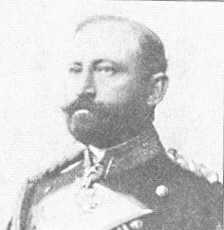
- Born: Felix Eduard Robert Emil Bendemann; 8 August 1848; Dresden, Saxony
- Died: 31 October 1915 (aged 67); Halensee
- Relatives: Rudolf Bendemann
- Military career
- Allegiance: German Empire
- Branch: Imperial German Navy
- Service years: 1864–1907
- Rank: Admiral
- Commands: Marinestation der Nordsee; East Asia Squadron; SMS Deutschland; SMS Brandenburg; SMS Olga; SMS Sperber (1860)
- Conflicts: Franco-Prussian War

Felix von Bendemann (8 August 1848 – 31 October 1915) was an Admiral of the German Imperial Navy (Kaiserliche Marine).

== Early life ==
Bendemann was born in Dresden, Kingdom of Saxony. He was the son of the painter Eduard Julius Friedrich Bendemann (1811–1889) and Lida Schadow, who was the daughter of the sculptor Johann Gottfried Schadow. The painter Rudolf Bendemann was his brother.

== Naval career ==
Bendemann and three brothers served in the Franco-Prussian War in 1870–71. He was in the Prussian Navy as an officer on the gunboat SMS Meteor in Key West when the war began. On 23 October the news of the outbreak of war reached the ship's captain, Eduard von Knorr. Meteor sailed for Cuba where, on 9 November they fought the only serious naval battle of the war with the French aviso Bouvet commanded by capitaine de frégate Alexandre Franquet. After an artillery exchange and an attempts by the Bouvet to ram the Meteor, both ships were incapacitated. Although the French left the scene of battle, the outcome was indecisive. As a result of this wartime conduct, he was honored with the then rarely given Iron Cross.

Bendeman was enrolled in the German Imperial Naval Academy (Marineakademie) in 1874. In his class would be three other future admirals: Otto von Diederichs, Viktor Valois and Gustav von Senden-Bibran. He then commanded the gunboat Sperber from September 1876 to April 1877.

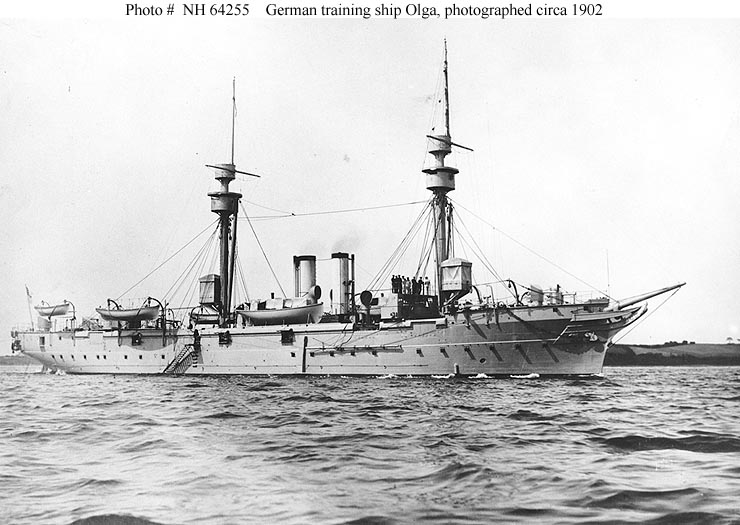
On trainingship SMS Olga Bendemann furthered German imperialist interest in West Africa.

Lieutenant-Commander (Korvettenkapitän) Bendemann commanded the screw corvette SMS Olga in 1884 as part of the newly formed West African-cruiser squadron (Westafrikanische Geschwader), again under Rear Admiral Eduard von Knorr, to carry out "gunboat diplomacy" in Germany's Western African area of interest, the colony of Kamerun, against a local revolt. Troops landed from Knorr's corvette SMS Bismarck and the Olga stormed the rebels and by 22 December succeeded in defeating the rebels. This led to treaties with France and Britain recognizing Cameroon as a German Colony. Afterward, a pleased Kaiser Wilhelm I awarded Bendemann the Prussian Order of the Royal Crown, 3rd Class with Swords.

He and the German navy suffered a misfortune on 16 February 1894. While Captain of the pre-dreadnought battleship SMS Brandenburg taking a trial trip with forced drought the main boiler-tube burst, the explosion causing the death of over forty men.

From 14 March until 31 December 1899, he served as Chief of the Admiralty Staff (Admiralstab). In this position he expressed his concern for what he saw as Germany's hopeless situation with a weak navy and facing Britain in isolation. One solution he saw an alliance with the United States, which was already a valuable trading partner of Germany. He also favored such realpolitik actions as the violation of Danish neutrality, in case of war with Great Britain, by immediately occupying the waterways of the Danish archipelago (The Belts) to deny the Royal Navy access to the Baltic Sea and Russia.

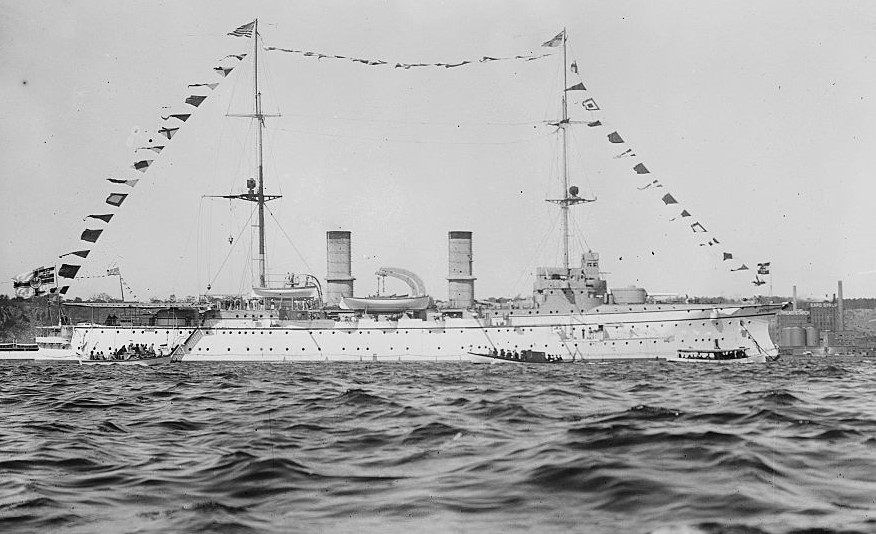
SMS Hertha, Bendemann's second flagship in China waters.

From February 1900 until 1902, he commanded the East Asia Squadron (Ostasiengeschwader) from his flagships the protected cruiser SMS Irene, and then the protected cruiser SMS Hertha. When Bendemann took command of the East Asia Squadron, he found it unprepared for the challenges presented by the Boxer Rebellion. He actually had to borrow charts from the Russians and maps from the British in order to operate in the Yellow Sea. Nevertheless, he forcefully advanced the idea of taking the Taku Forts and the ships under his command were able to make a noteworthy contribution in the Battle of Taku Forts. On 8 June 1900, he brought the large cruisers Hansa and Hertha and the small cruisers SMS Gefion and Irene before the Taku Fort (together with warships of other nations) to land detachments of Seebataillone (marines) for the protection of their citizens in Tientsin

From 1903 through 1907, he was head of the North Sea Naval Station Marinestation der Nordsee in Wilhelmshaven.

Admiral von Bendemann died in Halensee (Berlin) on 31 October 1915.

== Honors ==
- 1870—Honored with the then rarely given Iron Cross
- 1884—Prussian Order of the Royal Crown, 3rd Class with Swords.
- 1902—Honorary Knight Grand Cross of the Order of St Michael and St George.
- 1905—Bendemann was raised to the Prussian nobility (knighted).
- 1906—Japan's ribbon bar 1st Class, Grand Cordon was conferred on 8 May 1906, recognizing his actions as Commander of the Squadron during the Boxer Rebellion.
- 1909—Inducted as member 390 of the Gesetzlose Gesellschaft zu Berlin.
- 'Mount Bendemann' and 'Bendemann Harbour' in New Guinea were named in his honor by his friend Wilhelm Knappe, who was German colonial commissioner (Reichskommissar) in the area, 1887–1910.
