= Régis Voyron =

French soldier and officer

Émile Jean François Régis Voyron
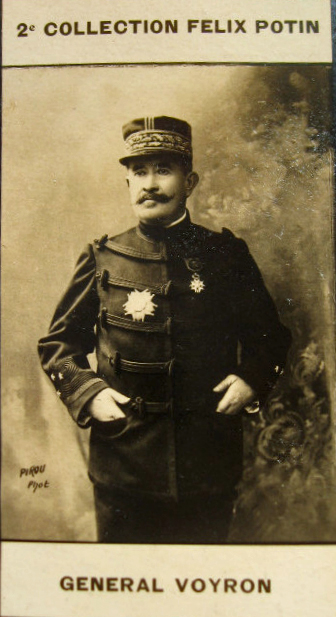
- Born: 5 August 1838; Dieulefit, Drôme, Kingdom of France
- Died: 26 November 1921 (aged 83); La Voulte-sur-Rhône, Ardèche, French Republic,
- Military career
- Allegiance: French Empire; French Republic
- Branch: French Army
- Service years: 1858–1903
- Rank: Division general
- Commands: 1st Marine Infantry Regiment
- Conflicts: Franco-Prussian War: Battle of Bazeilles (WIA); Franco-Hova Wars; Boxer Rebellion: Battle of Langfang
- Awards: Legion of Honour; Médaille militaire

Émile Jean François Régis Voyron was a 19th-century French general most notable for his service in the Franco-Prussian War and the Boxer Rebellion.

== Early life ==
Voyron was born in Dieulefit in southeastern France on 5 August 1838. He entered the École spéciale militaire de Saint-Cyr in 1858.

== Career ==
He earned the rank of second lieutenant of the 1st Marine Infantry Regiment colonial regiment. He was promoted to lieutenant in 1863 while serving in Martinique. In 1864, he traveled to Cochinchina in Southeast Asia, where he earned the rank of captain.

Voyron returned to France in 1870. He was wounded in the Battle of Bazeilles while serving in the 12th Army Corps during the Franco-Prussian War. He was interned in Leipzig, Germany until 1871. In 1872, Voyron was sent to New Caledonia, where he remained for four years. He was then appointed lieutenant-colonel and served in Senegal twice. He reached the rank of colonel in 1885 while commanding the Fourth Marine Infantry Regiment. He left for Tonkin in Vietnam in 1887.

On 17 June 1891, Voyron was promoted to brigadier general. He later became Inspector General in Dahomey, West Africa. In 1895, he served as senior commander of the 2nd Brigade of the Expeditionary Force during the Madagascar expedition. On 21 August 1895, Voyron confronted the Malagasy army, which was entrenched behind fortifications in Andriba. His forces emerged victorious. The next day, his forces took control of the Andriba Valley without firing any shots. On 1 October 1895, Madagascar's queen Ranavalona III signed the protectorate treaty. In 1896, Voyron took command of the Cherbourg Brigade in northern France.

Voyron was promoted to Inspector General in the West Indies, then to major general in 1898. He commanded the French Expeditionary Force in China in 1900 during the Boxer Rebellion. At the end of the revolt, in 1900, he was appointed to the Superior Council of War.

Voyron retired in 1903 and died on 26 November 1921. He was interred in La Voulte, France.

== Awards ==
- Legion of Honour: knight (31 January 1872), officer (3 April 1883), commander (3 May 1889), grand officer (30 December 1895), grand cross (1901).
- Médaille militaire: 29 December 1903
- Medal of the expeditions of Cochinchina, Cambodia, Senegal, Sudan, Tonkin, Annam, Madagascar, China

=== Foreign awards ===
- Belgium: Order of Leopold
- Comoros: Order of the Star of Anjouan
- Empire of Japan: Order of the Rising Sun
- Nguyễn dynasty: Order of the Dragon of Annam
- Russian Empire: Grand Cross of the Order of St. Alexander Nevsky
- Tunisia: Nichan Iftikhar
- United States: Military Order of the Dragon
