= Tibullus book 1 =

Book of ten Latin love poems written by Tibullus, c. 27 BC

Tibullus book 1 is the first of two books of poems by the Roman poet Tibullus (c. 56–c.19 BC). It contains ten poems written in Latin elegiac couplets, and is thought to have been published about 27 or 26 BC.

Five of the poems (1, 2, 3, 5, 6) speak of Tibullus's love for a woman called Delia; three (4, 8 and 9) of his love for a boy called Marathus. The seventh is a poem celebrating the triumph in 27 BC of Tibullus's patron Marcus Valerius Messalla Corvinus, following his victory in a military campaign against the Aquitanians. In 1, 5, and 10 he also writes of his deep love for life in the countryside and his dislike of war, a theme which both begins and ends the book.

The elegies of Tibullus are famous for the beauty of their Latin. Of the four great love-elegists of ancient Rome (the other three were Cornelius Gallus, Propertius, and Ovid), the rhetorician Quintillian praised him for being "the most polished and elegant". Modern critics have found him "enigmatic" and psychologically complex.

== The structure of book 1 ==
Book 1 of Tibullus has ten poems, the same number as Virgil's Eclogues and Horace's Satires 1, which were published within the same decade. The average length of the poems in book 1 (c. 81 lines) is nearly exactly the same as the average length of Virgil's Eclogues (c. 83 lines).

R. J. Littlewood (1970) argues that the poems are not randomly arranged but symmetrically as follows:

1 – Introduction
2 – Separation from Delia
3 – Separation from Delia
4 – Genre poem (Priapus' advice)
5 – Delia's infidelity
6 – Delia's infidelity
7 – Genre poem (ode to Messalla)
8 – Marathus' infidelity
9 – Marathus' infidelity
10 – Conclusion

Helena Dettmer (1980) agrees with this analysis, and in addition finds concentric patterns hidden in the number of lines in each poem; for example, poems 1 + 10 = 4 + 7 = 146/148 lines; 2 + 8 = 3 + 9 = 176/178 lines. A similar symmetrical arrangement is found in poems 1–9 of Virgil's Eclogues, with a similar arithmetical pattern of lines. However, the significance of such arithmetical patterns, if they are not a coincidence, is unknown.

== Tibullus's style ==
=== General characteristics ===
Julia Gaisser writes: "Tibullus does not develop his ideas in a smooth forward progression of narration or description. Rather, he composes a series of separate and more or less self-contained episodes or sections whose important relation is not necessarily to each other but to a main theme. It is a part of Tibullus' skill to connect these sections by subtle transitions and by recurring motifs and images. The arrangement of ideas in the elegies often seems to violate the laws of both logic and simple time sequence. The connection between sections is not always obvious; the poet's thoughts range from present to future to past and back again in defiance of chronology." She characterises Tibullus as "a master of the vignette, skilled in the presentation of vivid and memorable scenes within the compass of a very few lines."

His style has been called "immediate, unpretentious, but deceptively simple".

Maltby (1999) points out several features of Tibullus's linguistic style. He notes how Tibullus compared with Propertius adopts a purity of style, avoiding diminutives such as ocellus "little eye" and compound words such as liniger "linen-wearing", and only rarely using Greek borrowings. Seneca the Elder reports that Tibullus's patron Messalla was a stickler for pure Latin: Latini ... sermonis observator diligentissimus (Contr. 2.4.8), which may explain these preferences. Occasionally, however, Tibullus varies his style, for example in the speech of Priapus in elegy 4, which he introduces with mock-epic language and adds to the humour by using rather pompous language in the speech itself, as though Priapus were a professor.

Although on the whole Tibullus avoids Greek vocabulary, he does adopt some Greek mannerisms, such as "echoic" verses in which a word or phrase is repeated within the same couplet (e.g. 1.4.61–2).

Putnam (2005) notes Tibullus's clever use of assonance and alliteration, for example, where fic ... fec... fac and til ... cul ...cil ... quel make a pleasing sound:

Fictilia antiquus primum sibi fecit agrestis
Pocula, de facili conposuitque luto.
"The ancient farmer first made for himself earthenware
cups, and fashioned them from easily worked clay."

Hoffer (2007) notes that there are also several places where Tibullus uses adjective interlacing to good effect, for example 1.7.16, 18, and 22. An example is:

fertilis aestiva Nilus abundet aqua
"The fertile Nile abounds with water even in summer"

=== Verbal and thematic echoes ===
A notable feature of Tibullus's poetry is the repeated use of the same words, phrases, and motifs in more than one poem, or sometimes within the same poem. The closest connections are found between the first and last poems (1 and 10) and again between the two central poems (5 and 6), where in each pair a series of echoes in vocabulary or theme link the two poems together. But links are also found connecting other pairs of poems in the collection. For example, the description of the powers of a witch comes in both 2 and 8; a lovers' quarrel in both 6 and 10; the old lady guarding Delia and keeping her chaste occurs in both 3 and 6. Phrases such as mors atra 'black death', liquida aqua 'clear water', celeri rota / celeri orbe rotae 'swift wheel', vincla detrahet / detrecto vincla 'remove the fastenings' occur in more than one poem. In some cases these verbal echoes enable the reader to discover extra layers of meaning in the poems, as with the inhabitants of Tartarus in poem 3, who are shown by the intratextual links to be persons who have thwarted Tibullus's love life.

An example of words repeated within a poem is laxo ... sinu 'with loose fold' (1.6.18) and laxa sinu (1.6.40). The first refers to the loose, revealing clothing of Delia, the second to the foppish dress of her would-be suitor. In the same poem at mihi ... credas 'trust me' (1.6.23) is picked up by at mihi ... credas (1.6.37), in both cases making the suggestion that the husband should entrust Delia to Tibullus. In poem 9 with liquidas ... aquas 'clear water' (1.9.12) Tibullus expresses the hope that the gifts given to Marathus will be turned into water, while with liquida ... aqua (1.9.50) he hopes that his own poems will be washed away with water.

=== Chiastic structures ===
Tibullus's poems are generally chiastically structured (a technique also known as ring composition or inverse parallelism), and the poems can be divided into sections forming a pattern such as ABCDC'B'A'. Sometimes the corresponding sections are linked thematically; but often the chiasm is shown by verbal echoes. For example, in poem 1.5, the words celer...versat, furtivi...lecti, quaeso in the first eight lines are matched by versatur celeri, furtivus amor, quaeso in the last eight lines.

Sometimes individual sections within the poems are also chiastically structured, with their own internal verbal links. An example is the last section of 1.8 (lines 67–78), where desistas 'you should cease' in 67 and oderunt fastidia 'they hate disdainful behaviour' in 69 are matched in reverse order by odit fastus 'he hates disdainful behaviour' in 75 and desinis 'you cease' in 77.

=== Parallel writing ===
Tibullus also occasionally uses parallel writing, again employing verbal echoes. Thus poems 1.1 and 1.10 have a dozen points of contact, in more or less the same order in both poems; and the same is true of poems 1.5 and 1.6. An example of such links is asper and gloria in lines 1 and 2 of poem 1.5, and also in lines 2 and 3 of poem 1.6. In book 2, poems 2.2 and 2.5, despite being of different lengths, are also parallel.

== Characters ==
=== Delia ===
Delia is thought to be a pseudonym. Apuleius states that her real name was Plania; if this is correct (which is not certain), there is a word play with the Greek word δῆλος (dēlos), which is the equivalent of Latin plānus "clear, plain". Like Catullus's Lesbia she takes her pseudonym from a Greek island: but the name Delia, "the Delian", has a further resonance, since it is used in Latin poetry (for the first time in Virgil, Eclogue 7.29) for the beautiful goddess Diana, who was said to have been born on the island of Delos, and who was not only famed for her beauty but is also the sister of Apollo, the god of poetry. Propertius's pseudonym Cynthia for his girlfriend has the same meaning, since Cynthus is a mountain on Delos where Diana and her brother Apollo were born.

Delia is described as having a "husband" in poem 1.2.43, but it appears from 1.6.67 to 68 that she does not wear the headband and long dress usual for respectable married Roman women. It is likely therefore that she was only the husband's concubine not his wife, and that her status was that of a freedwoman. In poem 5 she is said to have a "rich lover" (dives amator, 1.5.47)), while in poem 6 she has a lover she is concealing from Tibullus in the same way that she conceals Tibullus from her husband (1.6.5–8). If so, she may be thought of as being a courtesan such as Philocomasium in Plautus's Miles Gloriosus, Phronesium in Plautus' Truculentus, or Thais in Terence's Eunuchus, all of whom have a rich soldier lover as well as a less well off young lover. From poem 6 we learn that Delia has a mother who takes Tibullus's side, secretly opening the door and letting him into the house at night when the husband is asleep (6.57–64). Delia is not kept in seclusion, but attends dinner parties at which both Tibullus and the husband are present (1.6.15–30). She wears jewelled rings (1.6.25–26) and a décolleté style of clothing at dinner parties (1.6.18). In 1.5.43–44, she is described as having tender (i.e. delicate) arms and blond hair.

Tibullus's dream is to persuade Delia to come and live with him on his ancestral farm, but it appears he was unsuccessful, since in poem 5 she takes up with a rich lover (dives amator), and after poem 6 her name is not mentioned again.

=== Marathus ===
It is thought that Marathus is also a pseudonym. In Greek, μάραθος (marathos; both "a"s are short) means "fennel". The name is suitable for a slave or freedman (one of Augustus's freedmen had this name). Although various suggestions have been made about the choice of name, none has proved certain. In the view of some scholars, Marathus was possibly not a real person but a literary fiction, allowing Tibullus to explore love from a different angle. He is said to have fallen in love with a girl called Pholoë, presumably also a courtesan, who visits him at night apparently escorted by Tibullus (1.8.55–66, 1.9.42). Despite his falling for a girl, he is depicted as very effeminate, wearing make up and constantly rearranging his hair, trimming his nails, and changing his clothes (1.8.9–12), as well as prone to burst into tears (1.8.67, 1.9.37).

Marathus turns out to be unfaithful to Tibullus. Unlike Catullus's Iuventius, who falls for the handsome but impecunious Furius, Marathus, like Delia, takes up with an older, richer man, to Tibullus's indignation and fury.

The three Marathus poems are not unique in Latin literature of this period in depicting pederastic love. Catullus, for example, as well as his great love Lesbia, also frequently writes about his love for a boy called Iuventius. Virgil in his 2nd eclogue writes a humorous song of an Arcadian shepherd Corydon who is trying unsuccessfully to woo a city boy called Alexis. Horace, in Epodes 11, declares that he is no longer in love with Inachia and is now smitten with a boy called Lyciscus; similarly in Odes 4.1, Horace declares that though formerly in love with a girl Cinara, he is now dreaming at night of a boy called Ligurinus. Propertius, though not pederastic himself, writes to a friend Gallus, who according to one poem is deeply in love with a girl, but in another is in love with a handsome boy.

== Poem 1 – Divitias alius ==
=== Summary of poem 1 ===
==== First ring ====
- 1 Let another man, who can put up with the terrors of war, pile up riches and own a large estate. Tibullus himself is content with an untroubled life of poverty, as long as he has a fire to keep him warm.
- 7 He imagines himself planting vines and fruit trees in the country. He expects a good harvest of fruit, corn, and wine, since he venerates the country gods, especially Ceres, Priapus, and the Lares, promising to sacrifice a calf and a lamb to them for a good harvest.
- 25 Tibullus says he would be content to live on only a small income: he pictures himself resting by a stream in the shade on hot days, using a hoe, ploughing with oxen, or carrying home a lamb or a kid goat. He calls on the gods to accept his offerings, in simple earthenware vessels, like in the olden days. He does not require the wealth of his father and grandfather: a small crop is enough.
- 45 It is delightful on cold days to rest on his bed, with his mistress in his arms, listening to the wind and rain outside. Let the man who can put up with the wild sea and storms be rightly rich.

==== Second ring ====
- 51 It would be better for all gold and jewels to perish rather than that his girlfriend should weep while he travels abroad. He tells Messalla that making war by land and sea to bring back booty is suitable for Messalla, not himself.
- 55 He himself is bound by the chains of a girl, and sits like a doorkeeper outside her unyielding door. Speaking now to Delia, he tells her that he does not wish to be praised; as long as he is with her, he is content to be called idle. He hopes that he may see her even at his final hour, and predicts that she will weep for him after his death. No young man or woman will go home from his funeral without tears. Meanwhile, while the fates allow, they should love: death will come soon enough. Now, while they are still young, is the time for love affairs and breaking down doors.
- 75 He will do his soldiering at home; let those who desire money get wounds and wealth. He himself will be content with his small harvest, and will despise the rich and despise hunger.

=== Notes on poem 1 ===
==== Themes ====
Tibullus here combines some familiar themes: the contrast between the soldier and the farmer; the idealisation of the country life; the cruel girlfriend who refuses to admit her lover; and the thought that Death will come quickly. But he opens the poem in a striking way, only gradually letting the reader know where his thought is leading. He addresses his patron Messalla only in line 53, and Delia is not named until line 57. Putnam, in his article on this poem, calls the opening "audacious" and "daring".

In lines 49–54 Tibullus writes about his rejection of the life of travelling overseas, looking for wealth and military spoils. The three couplets are linked together by an unusual series of rhymes, since the three pentameters end with the words pluvias, vias, exuvias "rain showers, roads, spoils", as if these three things are linked together in the poet's mind.

As will become clear from poems 3 and 7, Tibullus (as might be expected of a young man from an equestrian family) had already travelled abroad as part of Messalla's entourage at least twice. On one of these journeys (see poem 3) he had fallen ill on the island of Corfu and had had to abandon the expedition.

In lines 19–22 Tibullus says that his father and grandfather had a much larger estate than he himself did at the time of writing the poem. This recalls similar statements in Virgil and Propertius in which both poets lament the loss of their family property. This is ascribed to the confiscations of 41–40 BC, when Octavian resettled his veteran soldiers following the battle of Philippi; but it is not known for certain whether Tibullus's land was lost in the same confiscations. There is a similar passage in the Panegyricus Messallae (a poem of disputed date and authorship which forms part of book 3 of the Tibullan corpus), where the author states that some, but not all, of his family's ancestral land had been lost. It has been inferred from Horace's Epistle 1.4.2 that Tibullus's family estate was at Pedum (believed to have been near Gallicano del Lazio, about 20 miles east of Rome).

In the poem there are several echoes of Virgil's Eclogues and Georgics, especially Eclogue 1, which had been published about 37 BC. But the idealised Greek bucolic landscape of the Eclogues is here replaced by a much more realistic Roman one.

Lines 59–68, where Tibullus imagines Delia weeping at his funeral, have been compared to similar lines in Propertius 1.17.19–24 (published about 30 BC or 28 BC), where Propertius imagines his girlfriend Cynthia doing the same for him. There seems to have been an exchange between the two poets: most scholars think Propertius book 1 was written first, answered (possibly with a hint of mockery) in Tibullus book 1, answered in Propertius book 2, and so on.

Maltby (2002) notes how the opening of this poem (divitias alius ... congerat "let another man pile up riches") echoes a sentence in Cicero's de Amicitia 20, which begins divitias alii praeponunt "some men put riches before friendship". The implication is that Tibullus takes the view that friendship is more important than wealth.

The poem has several verbal echoes with poem 1.10, which occur in more or less the same order in both poems (for details see below). It thus appears to be an example of parallel writing. Poems 1.5 and 1.6 are similarly parallel.

==== Structure ====
Structurally, the poem consists of two halves: 1–50 and 51–78. The first half mainly deals with Tibullus's desire for a simple life of farming, the second with his love for Delia. Each half is a ring (chiastic structure): both rings begin and end with Tibullus's rejection of the idea of travelling overseas in order to get rich. Within the first ring, the section from 25–44 itself appears to have a ring structure. Poem 10, with which this poem is linked (see Poem 10 below), has a similar structure consisting of two rings with an internal ring inside the first.

Some scholars, including Murgatroyd (1977) and Goold (1988, Loeb edition), argue that lines 25–32 of this poem are out of place, and were originally positioned between lines 6 and 7. Justifying this change, Murgatroyd writes: "If a poet in one couplet wishes for a life of 'inertia' but in the next immediately speaks of the work that he will perform then (only to drop that topic promptly for another twenty lines), that deserves to be described not as a progression in thought but as an illogical jerk." He also sees lines 11–44, after this change is made, as a ring structure. However, the apparent ring structure of lines 25–44 (if the disputed lines are kept in place), as well as the series of points of connection between this poem and 1.10 (see below), both argue against this transposition.

== Poem 2 – Adde merum ==
=== Summary of poem 2 ===
- 1 Tibullus calls for wine to drown his sorrows. He explains that his girlfriend has been put under a strong guard. He begs the door to open for him and forgive him if he ever cursed it. Instead the door should remember the times when he honoured the door with garlands.
- 15 Addressing Delia, he calls on her not to be timid about deceiving the guards. Venus favours lovers, but only those who are not afraid to brave the dark night. With Venus's help a lover need not fear being attacked or be troubled by cold wet weather. He begs anyone who sees him by chance to avert their eyes and tell no one, or he will feel Venus's wrath.
- 41 He assures Delia that even if someone tells her husband, her husband will not believe it. The reason is that he has seen a very powerful witch who has given him a magic spell for her to use which will make the husband unable to see him (although he'll still be able to see her other lovers!) – Suddenly he has doubts, recalling that he had previously asked the witch for a spell to make their love mutual, but it had not worked.
- 65 He says the lover must be very hard-hearted who left her to go and seek money soldiering abroad. He says he wouldn't mind even sleeping on the ground, if only Delia would join him at his farm in the country. What is the point of having an expensively furnished bed if one lies awake all night weeping?
- 79 Tibullus wonders if perhaps he has inadvertently offended Venus in some way. He would gladly make a penance if so. – Addressing the reader (or a member of the audience, or a drinking companion), he warns him not to laugh at him. He warns the man that Venus will punish him one day by making him fall in love even in his old age and be the subject of mockery by boys and young men. – He ends by begging Venus to forgive him, and declares that he has always been her devoted servant.

=== Notes on poem 2 ===
This poem, taking up the image in poem 1.55–56, belongs to an established class of love poetry called the paraklausithyron, in which an excluded lover makes complaints to the locked door of his girlfriend's house.

At line 65 there are various interpretations as to who is meant by the hard-hearted lover. One possibility is that it refers to Delia's husband who has gone away to earn money soldiering abroad leaving Delia under guard in his house. Another possibility, however, is that Tibullus is chiding himself, since, as will emerge from the next poem, he himself at one stage left Delia to accompany his patron Messalla abroad and was reluctant to do so.

As several scholars have pointed out, there are a number of parallels in this poem with situations in Roman comedy, for example the locked-out lover (Plautus's Curculio and Truculentus) and the old man who makes himself ridiculous by falling in love (Plautus's Asinaria, Bacchides, and Casina). Griffin (1986) writes: “These resemblances between Comedy and Elegy are more than verbal echoes. They relate to central ideas and attitudes of the genre.”

Poem 2 has a number of connections with 8. Both contain a description of the powers of a witch (1.2.41–52, 1.8.17–22); both contain descriptions of deceiving the guards and creeping around stealthily in the night (1.2.15–20, 1.8.57–60); both end by promising punishment for disrespecting the god of love (1.2.87–96, 1.8.77–78).

But there are also links to 5 and 6: the image of Delia on Tibullus's farm in 1.2.70 is taken up again in 1.5.21. In 2 Tibullus encourages Delia to deceive the guards; in 6 he blames himself for teaching her how to deceive the guards (1.2.15, 1.6.9–10).

The structure of the poem is chiastic. The first and last sections speak of Tibullus's anguish and the times he has honoured the door and Venus. In the second and fourth sections Tibullus addresses Delia and speaks of his longing to be with her. The centrepiece of the poem (41–64) is a graphic description of the supposed powers of the witch that Tibullus has engaged to help him.

== Poem 3 – Ibitis Aegaeas ==
=== Summary of poem 3 ===
- 1 Addressing Messalla, Tibullus bids him and the rest of the entourage farewell. He explains that he is ill in an unknown land, Phaeacia, and he hopes that Death spares him. Here there is no mother or sister to conduct his funeral. Delia too, who consulted all the gods before he left Rome, is also absent.
- 11 Tibullus relates how Delia wept, despite obtaining good omens; but he himself, when leaving Rome, found all sorts of bad omens to delay his departure.
- 23 What use now are all Delia's prayers to her favourite goddess, Isis? He begs Isis to help him now, so that Delia may repay the vows she made.
- 33 Tibullus prays that he may get back to worship at the shrines of his fathers' gods, the Penates and Lares. He describes how much better life was in the Golden Age, before ships were invented and no one travelled abroad looking for wealth.
- 49 But the present age, the Age of Jupiter, is full of slaughter and wounds. He imagines the epitaph which will be written on his tombstone: 'Here lies Tibullus, who died when following Messalla by land and sea.'
- 57 He imagines how after his death Venus will lead him to join other lovers in Elysium.
- 67 From here he turns to a description of Tartarus, where sinners are punished. He hopes that whoever wished him to abandon his love and go on a long military campaign may end up there.
- 83 Addressing Delia, he hopes that she is remaining faithful, guarded by an old woman, who will tell stories to her by lamplight until bedtime while she spins wool. He imagines how he will suddenly appear unexpectedly, as if sent from heaven, and how Delia will rush bare-footed with unkempt hair to meet him. He prays that Aurora the goddess of Dawn will bring this shining Morning Star to him.

=== Notes on poem 3 ===
==== Tibullus on Corfu ====
Tibullus writes this poem apparently from the island of Corfu (Corcyra), where he is ill. It appears that he went there as part of the entourage accompanying his patron Messalla on a journey to the Eastern Mediterranean, but was left behind because of his illness. According to Ronald Syme, Messalla probably succeeded Didius as governor of Syria in 30/29 or 29/28 BC.

It was, it seems, common for young men of good family to accompany important men as part of their entourage on their journeys abroad. For example, Horace describes a journey he was required to make, along with Virgil, to accompany their patron Maecenas to Brundisium in 37 BC. Another well known example is Catullus, who, along with the poet Helvius Cinna, accompanied his patron Gaius Memmius to Bithynia in 57–56 BC, but was disappointed not to be allowed to make any money there.

Tibullus refers to Corfu as Phaeacia, the last island visited by Odysseus in Homer's Odyssey before his return home, which was often identified with Corfu. With this name he identifies himself with Odysseus and Delia as an unlikely Penelope, waiting for him chastely at home. The description of the punishments of Tityos and Tantalus also appear to be taken from the Odyssey (11.576–592).

This part of Tibullus's poem was imitated in Ovid's memorial poem on Tibullus (Ovid, Amores 3.9) as well as in a poem written when Ovid himself was in exile and seriously ill (Tristia 3.3).

==== Links to other poems ====
In line 3 Tibullus claims to be dying in ignotis terris 'unknown lands'. The repetition of this phrase in line 39 in connection with those who go abroad in search of money hints that Tibullus blames himself for choosing to go abroad to seek wealth, abandoning Delia; something which he had already criticised in poem 2.65.

Poems 3 and 9, though ostensibly on different topics (Tibullus's illness on Corfu and Marathus's infidelity), have several points of contact. For example, in poem 3 Tibullus claims to have committed no perjury (periuria; 1.3.51); Venus will reward him and lead him to the Elysian fields (1.3.57–58), while those who violate his love will go to Tartarus (1.3.81). In poem 9, he reproaches Marathus for perjury (1.9.3), and he warns him that Venus will be harsh to those who violate love (1.9.19–20).

The description of what did not happen in the Golden Age in poem 3 (1.3.39–42) has a lot in common with the description of the effects of desire for wealth in poem 9 (1.9.7–10).

Both 3 and 9 also describe an inscription on an imaginary monument, with very similar wording:

hic iacet immiti consumptus morte Tibullus (1.3.55)
'here lies Tibullus, consumed by cruel death'

hanc tibi fallaci resolutus amore Tibullus (1.9.83)
'Tibullus (dedicates) this to you, freed from a deceptive love'

Intratextual links with poems 1 and 5 are found in the description of Tartarus (lines 67–82). In this passage, as Joshua Paul points out, verbal echoes show that the various inhabitants of Tartarus are intended to represent the different persons who have violated or thwarted Tibullus's love life. Thus the Fury Tisiphone, who chases an impious crowd of souls, represents the procuress of poem 5, who is driven mad like a Fury (furens) as souls flit around her and who is chased by a crowd of dogs (1.3.70, 1.5.51–56); Cerberus, who 'lies in front of the bronze doors', represents the doorkeeper, who 'sits in front of the hard doors' (1.3.72, 1.1.56). As for those being punished, Ixion, whose limbs are 'turned on a swift wheel', represents Delia's rich lover, whom Tibullus reminds that Fortune 'turns with her swift wheel' (1.3.74, 1.5.70); Tityos, 'stretched across nine acres of land' and plagued by 'assiduous birds', represents the soldier-farmer with his 'many acres of soil' who puts up with 'assiduous labour' (1.3.75–76, 1.1.2-3); the Danaids, punished for killing their husbands, represent Delia herself: the jars which they fill with the water of Lethe ('Forgetfulness') recall by their name dolia the name Delia, while Lethe recalls her ingratitude for Tibullus's devotion (1.5.17).

The old woman who Tibullus hopes is guarding Delia in line 1.3.84 is apparently Delia's mother. She appears again, still called anus 'old lady', as Delia's mother in 1.6.57–66.

The phrase mors atra 'black death' links this poem to poem 10 (1.3.5, 1.10.33).

==== Ring structure ====
The poem is constructed as a chiastic ring in seven parts, with a contrast of Saturn's Golden Age with the Iron Age of Jupiter at its centre. In the first section, Tibullus's disastrous departure from Delia is contrasted with his joyful return in the last; the Odysseus-like Tibullus is contrasted with the Penelope-like Delia in the last section; Tibullus prays (cf. precor 'I pray' in 5 and 93) to 'black Death' at the beginning and to 'white Dawn' at the end; the three women (mother, sister, Delia) mourning in the first section are balanced by the three women (old woman, maid, and Delia) spinning in the last; the sister's dishevelled hair of grief (8) in the first section matches Delia's dishevelled hair of joy (91) in the last.

In the second section (11–22) the omina dira 'dire omens' met with by Tibullus at the gate (in porta, 20) are matched in the sixth section by black Cerberus at the gate (in porta, 71) of Tartarus; an offence against Saturn (18) is matched by an offence against Juno (Saturn's daughter) (73).

In the third section (23–32) the goddess Isis (23) balances the goddess Venus (58) in the fifth section; and hair is again mentioned, together with the word insignis 'conspicuous', in 31–2 and 66; unkempt hair is mentioned again in line 69.

In the central section (33–56), the words patrios (33) and pater (51) make a frame for the description of the two Ages. The Age of Saturn (35–48) is contrasted with that of Jupiter (49–50); vias 'ways' in 36 contrasts with viae in 52, and the mention of seafaring in 37 is picked up by the word mare 'sea' in 50. As in the central sections in some other poems of Tibullus there is a multiple anaphora (non ... non ... non ... non ... non ...). Another characteristic found in Tibullus's central sections is that they often consist of a digression on a general subject, as here, contrasting with the poet's personal concerns that come before and after them.

The structure of the poem as a whole can thus be schematised as follows:

A 1–10 – Tibullus's departure and illness
B 11–21 – Delia weeps; sad omens for Tibullus
C 22–32 – Delia and Tibullus's prayers to Isis
D 33–48 – The Age of Saturn; no warfare
D' 49–56 – The Age of Jupiter; Tibullus's death
C' 57–66 – Venus escorts Tibullus to Elysium
B' 67–82 – Punishment in Tartarus of those who have harmed Tibullus
A' 83–94 – Tibullus's joyful homecoming

== Poem 4 – Sic umbrosa tibi ==
=== Summary of poem 4 ===
- 1 The poet addresses Priapus, the fertility god of gardens, and asks him to explain his skill in capturing handsome boys, despite his unprepossessing appearance.
- 9 In reply, the god warns him to keep away from boys, since all of them are good-looking and may capture Tibullus rather than the other way round. One boy is attractive because he rides a horse, another because he swims; one because he is confident, another because he is shy.
- 15 Tibullus must be patient if he wishes to catch a boy. In time they will submit.
- 21 He should not be afraid to swear falsely by the gods. Diana will not mind if he swears by her arrows, or Minerva if he swears by her hair.
- 27 But he must not wait too long, otherwise the boy's beauty will fade. Only the gods Bacchus and Phoebus retain their beautiful hair for ever.
- 39 To win a boy over, Tibullus must be prepared to obey his every whim, accompanying him on long walks in rain or shine, rowing if he wants to go boating, carrying the nets if he wishes to go hunting, sparring with him if he wants to practise fencing.
- 53 Then the boy will allow kisses, at first reluctantly, then willingly, and finally he will even give hugs of his own accord.
- 56 Alas, these days boys expect gifts. If only boys could be won over by poetry! Priapus curses those who sell their favours for money and hopes they become eunuch devotees of the goddess Cybele. He advises Tibullus, as with all love affairs, to use endearments, complaints, and tears.
- 73 Tibullus explains that he is asking not for himself but on behalf of his friend Titius, whose wife disapproves of his interest in boys. Tibullus boasts that he is able and willing to give advice to all lovers. Suddenly he confesses that he himself is being tortured by his love for a boy called Marathus. He begs Marathus not to make him a laughing stock!

=== Notes on poem 4 ===
==== General views ====
In this poem the god Priapus advises the poet how to catch a handsome boy. At the end despite priding himself on his wisdom in love affairs and his ability to instruct others, Tibullus reveals that he himself has been caught by a boy called Marathus.

The poem has been compared to Horace's Satires 1.8, in which a statue of Priapus complains about a pair of witches who have been holding ceremonies in his garden; and also to Propertius 4.2, which consists of a speech of the minor god Vertumnus. Another comparable poem is Horace's Satires 2.5, in which the ghost of the prophet Teiresias gives ironic advice to Ulysses that the best way of recouping his fortunes is by legacy-hunting. The Greek poet Callimachus too wrote a poem (only a fragment survives) in which Priapus speaks to a young man who is in love with a handsome youth.

Scholars have debated whether Tibullus's affair with Marathus is based on real experience or whether it is merely a fictional poetic construct. It has been noted that the activities mentioned by Priapus – horse-riding, boating, hunting – are more appropriate to aristocratic boys than the slaves who normally would be the object of attentions by Roman men. Some, however, see them not as real boys but as literary creations, recalling those in the epigrams of the Greek poet Callimachus.

It has been suggested that lines 1.73–74 where Tibullus teases his friend Titius for being under the thumb of his wife recall the situation in Catullus 50, where Catullus and his poet friend and age-mate Calvus exchange verses with one another as an amusement. It is thought that Titius may be the same as the poet Titius mentioned in Horace, Epistles 1.3.9, who accompanied the future emperor Tiberius on a trip to Armenia. If this Titius was the son of Marcus Titius (suffect consul in 31 BC), he might well have been the same age as Tibullus and of similar social class.

The unexpected twist at the end is reminiscent of the humorous ending of Horace's Satires 1.8, when the statue of Priapus suddenly splits with a loud noise and the witches run away. Another poem ending with an unexpected twist is Horace's Epode 2, where a long speech in favour of the country life is amusingly ended by the revelation that the speaker is Alfius, an urban money-lender.

As Dettmer shows, there are several links between this poem and poem 7 (see below for details).

==== Ring structure ====
Structurally, the poem is a simple ring composition (showing chiastic structure or inverse parallelism). The introduction (1–8) is balanced by the epilogue (73–84); Priapus's advice to Tibullus in 9–14 is balanced by his advice to the boys in 57–72; the observation that boys will yield given time in 15–20 is balanced by a similar observation in 53–56; Priapus's advice not to be afraid to swear falsely in 21–26 is balanced by advice to indulge the boy's whims in 39–52. Verbal echoes link together the corresponding sections: tenerae 'young' and puerorum 'boys' in 9 are matched by tener in 58 and pueri in 61, and colla 'necks' in 16 matches collo 'neck' in 56.

1–8 – Introduction: Tibullus questions Priapus
9–14 – Priapus's advice to Tibullus: don't trust boys!
15–20 – Boys will yield in time
21–26 – Advice: Don't be afraid to swear falsely
26 – Minerva's hair
27–36 – Warning: life passes quickly!
37–38 – Bacchus and Phoebus's hair
39–52 – Advice: Work hard to indulge the boy's whims
53–56 – Boys will yield in time
57–72 – Priapus's advice to boys: poetry is better than gifts
73-84 – Epilogue: Tibullus reveals that he is in love with a boy

The centre of the poem is the section from lines 27–36, a warning that life passes quickly. The words aetas 'age' and dies 'day' stand at the beginning and end of this section, and in between these the phrase quam cito 'how swiftly!' three times repeated. Such anaphoric repetition is common in Tibullus's centre pieces; examples are 2.1.47–59 (repeated rura/rure), 2.3.35 (repeated praeda), 2.6.20 (repeated spes). The central panel is framed by mention of Minerva's hair (crines) in 26 and Bacchus and Phoebus's hair in 37–38.

The neat chiastic structure makes it clear that Günther's (1997) proposal to make the sequence of thought more logical by moving 39–56 to follow line 20 is to be rejected.

== Poem 5 – Asper eram ==
=== Summary of poem 5 ===
- 1 Tibullus says he had boasted that he could bear the separation; now he realises he cannot, and he is being driven by the god of love like a top being whipped by a boy.
- 7 He begs Delia to spare him. He reminds her that he was the one who saved her life when she was ill, by performing certain rites and prayers. He paid off his vows to the gods, she got better, but now another man is enjoying her.
- 19 His dream of retiring to his farm with Delia as his wife is now shattered. She would be the mistress of the house, surrounded by the servants' children. She would be hostess to Messalla, picking fruit for him from the trees and serving him meals. But this dream has now gone with the winds.
- 37 He has tried to dispel his depression by drinking wine and visiting a prostitute for sex, but in vain. The woman concerned accused him of being bewitched, but the real cause of his impotence was Delia's beauty: she is as beautiful as the goddess Thetis was when she came riding on a dolphin as bride to Peleus.
- 47 The fact that Delia has a rich lover is due to a certain cunning procuress who introduced the man. Tibullus imagines all sorts of dire consequences for the procuress: she will be driven mad by ghosts, eat food from a graveyard, and run naked and screaming through the cities. The god of love has given him a sign that this will occur.
- 59 He begs Delia to ignore the advice of the rapacious witch: there is no love that cannot be defeated by gifts. But he tells her that it is only a poor person who will stick with her at all times, escort her through the crowded streets to visit her male friends in secret, and untie the fastenings of her snow-white foot. – Alas, the door will not open with words but needs to be knocked on with a "full hand" (i.e. bearing a gift).
- 69 He warns the rich lover to beware: the wheel of Fortune is turning. It is not for nothing that a certain person keeps furtively watching the door of Delia's house, pretending to pass by, returning and clearing his throat near the door. The lover should use his good fortune while he can, because it cannot last.

=== Notes on poem 5 ===
Several scholars have analysed this poem as a ring or chiastic structure in seven parts. Cairns's analysis is as follows:

A 1–8 – Tibullus' pangs of unrequited love
B 9–18 – Tibullus' past unsuccessful services for Delia
C 19–36 – His unfulfilled wishes about a future life with Delia
D 37–46 Delia's beauty makes a substitute impossible
C' 47–58 – Tibullus' wishes for the procuress, which will be fulfilled
B' 59–68 – The pauper (i.e. Tibullus)'s future services for Delia
A' 69–76 – The wheel of fortune will turn and Tibullus will displace his rival

Among the verbal links in this poem, the anaphoric ipse ... ipse ... ipse 'I myself' in section B (11–15) corresponds to the similarly anaphoric pauper ... pauper ... pauper 'a poor man' in B' (61–65), making it clear that the pauper represents Tibullus.

Another link is renuente deo 'though the god refused' at the beginning of section C (line 20), corresponding to dat signa deus 'the god is giving a sign', at the end of section C' (line 57). Section C is framed by the phrase (haec) mihi fingebam 'I was imagining these things' in lines 19–20 and 35.

In the final section, it is not specified who is meant by the word quidam 'a certain person' who keeps standing outside the door (line 71). Cairns takes it as referring to Tibullus, however. Ovid refers to the passage in Tristia 2.460, and linking it to the barking dog in 1.6.32, also implies that it was Tibullus.

Several scholars, beginning with Scaliger (1577), have suggested that the last six lines of this poem (71–76) are misplaced in the manuscripts, and they propose that they originally came between lines 32 and 33 of poem 6; Ovid's linking of 1.6.32 with these lines in Tristia 2.460 (see above) is one of the arguments cited as supporting the transposition. However, the existence of a series of verbal echoes which link the first eight lines of the poem and the last eight, namely celer ... versat (4), furtivi lecti (7) and quaeso (8), corresponding to versatur celeri (70), furtivus amor (75), and quaeso (75), makes the proposed transposition unlikely.

The final line 'for your boat is floating on clear water' is explained as meaning 'everything is going well for you for now (but soon things will change; the sea will grow rough)'.

The phrase liquida ... aqua 'clear water' in line 72 links this poem with 1.9.12 and 1.9.50 where the phrase recurs. The image of Tibullus escorting Delia at night to her secret male friends (line 65) also recurs in 1.9.42, where Tibullus claims to have led a girl Pholoë secretly to Marathus at night.

There are also numerous intratextual links between this poem and poem 6 (see below).

== Poem 6 – Semper, ut inducar ==
=== Summary of poem 6 ===
- 1 Tibullus complains that Love, who was pleasant at first, is now being harsh. Delia has another lover, even though she denies it. He blames himself for teaching her how to deceive her guards and how to make excuses to sleep alone.
- 15 He tells Delia's husband not to let her deceive him when she talks a lot about young men, or makes signs to them at the dinner table, or makes excuses to leave the house for a religious meeting. Tibullus remembers how he himself would touch Delia's hand by pretending to examine her ring or make her husband drunk while he himself stayed sober. He says he couldn't help his behaviour because he was controlled by the god Love. He confesses that he is the one that the husband's dog was barking at all night long. The husband doesn't deserve to have her if he can't watch over her. The husband should give the charge of watching over Delia to him: he won't mind being beaten like a slave. He would keep away the rival lovers!
- 43 He remembers how he consulted a prophetess of the goddess Bellona. Filled with the spirit of the goddess, the prophetess cut her arms till they bled, and warned that whoever violated a girl guarded by the god of Love would be punished: their wealth will flow away, as her blood is doing.
- 55 He tells Delia that the priestess said that she too would be punished. But he himself will not punish Delia, because her mother has aided and abetted him in his affair. – Addressing the mother he praises her and asks her to keep Delia chaste. He will submit to the same rules: let Delia cast him out into the street if she suspects he has been unfaithful. – But he tells Delia that he refuses to strike her, even when he is angry. He wants her to be faithful, but not from fear.
- 77 He assures her that a girl who does not stay faithful will end up in old age in poverty, spinning and weaving, while a crowd of young people laugh at her. But let this happen to other girls. He offers Delia the chance to be an example of love even when both of them are grey-haired.

=== Notes on poem 6 ===
==== Links to other poems ====
Both poem 5 and poem 6 are concerned with Delia's unfaithfulness, and as with poems 1 and 10, there are several verbal links and thematic echoes between them, for example:

The words asper "harsh" and gloria "boast" are applied to Tibullus in 5 and to Cupid in 6 (1.5.1–2, 1.6.2–3); Tibullus speaks of his and Delia's furtivi lecti "furtive bed" in 5, and of Delia's having sex furtim "furtively" with another man in 6 (1.5.7, 1.6.5–6); in 5 Tibullus remembers how he restored Delia to health, in 6 how he taught her how to deceive the guards (1.5.9–17, 1.6.9-14); the phrase ille ego 'I am the one (who did that)' is found in 5.9 and in 6.31.

In 5, Tibullus drinks wine to overcome his depression, in 6 he gives it to the husband to send him to sleep (1.5.37, 1.6.27); in 5 Tibullus has sex with a prostitute, while thinking of Delia, in 6 Delia has sex with her husband while thinking of Tibullus (1.5.39–40, 1.6.35).

In both poems Tibullus consults a woman (in one a prostitute, in the other a prophetess) who advises him (1.5.41–42, 1.6.51–55); in 5 he curses the procuress who introduced the rival to Delia, in 6 he blesses the mother who introduced Tibullus to Delia (1.5.47–60, 1.6.63–68).

In 5 he promises to untie the fastenings (vincla) of Delia's feet, in 6 he promises not to undo the fastenings (vincla) of his own feet which he wears like a slave (1.5.66, 1.6.38); in 5 he says the door needs to be struck with his hand, in 6 he says he would rather lose his hands than strike Delia (1.5.68, 1.6.73–74); in 5 he warns the rival to fear him, in 6 he wants Delia not to fear him (1.5.69, 1.6.75); in 5 he predicts that the rival will not enjoy Delia for long, in 7 he begs Delia to stay with him till old age (1.5.75–76, 1.6.85–86).

These links, apart from the ninth (vincla 'shackles'), come in the same order in both poems, showing that they are written in a parallel fashion, just as poems 1 and 10.

In several cases the images in 6 are the inverse or opposite of those in 5, and it appears to be a more optimistic ending than poem 5. However, there is no indication that Tibullus's pleas to Delia were successful, and her name is not mentioned again in the book.

The image of Delia spinning and weaving to make ends meet in her old age (1.6.77–82) takes up again the image of Delia spinning in poem 3 (1.3.85–88), but the context is completely different. The old lady (i.e. Delia's mother) that Tibullus desires to keep her chaste (67) recalls the old lady for whom he has the same prayer in 3.83. His desire to restrain himself from slapping her in anger with his hands is found again in 10.56 and 65.

==== Structure ====
Structurally, the poem is an asymmetric ring. Between 29–42 and 55–76 there are several verbal echoes (such as non ego te 'not I ... you' (29, 57, 73), nocte/noctu 'at night' (32, 61), foribus 'doors' (34, 61), absentes ... amores / absenti ... amor 'absent ... love(s)' (35, 76), saeva 'cruel' (37, 75), pedum/-es 'feet' (38, 62, 68), capillos/-is 'hair' (39, 71), and procul 'far' (39, 42, 61)) which frame the central section (the Priestess of Bellona).

There are also other verbal echoes (laxo ...sinu ~ laxa sinu 'with loose fold' (18, 40), mihi ... credas 'trust me' (23, 37), torta 'twisted' (46, 78)) which connect different parts of the poem but which are not chiastically placed.

== Poem 7 – Hunc cecinere diem ==
=== Summary of poem 7 ===
- 1 Tibullus celebrates the day when his patron Messalla celebrates his triumph over the Aquitanians. He describes Messalla as wearing victory laurels and riding on a chariot decorated with ivory.
- 13 He goes on to mention a journey through Cilicia, Palestine, and Tyre, and he addresses and praises the Nile, equating it with the god Osiris.
- 27 He sings of the god Osiris, worshipped by the Egyptians; how he taught agriculture, fruit-growing, and wine-making. Wine (Bacchus) teaches music, soothes sadness, brings relaxation song, and dance.
- 49 He calls on Osiris to be present today to celebrate Messalla's birthday. Tibullus prays for healthy offspring for Messalla.
- 57 He also commemorates the road which Messalla built between Tusculum and Alba, which is a great help for farmers returning home from the city. He ends by calling on the spirit of Messalla's birthday to return for many years to come.

=== Notes on poem 7 ===
In this poem, a genethliacon (birthday ode) for his patron Messalla, Tibullus celebrates Messalla's military conquests in Gaul, his triumphal procession following them, as well as his mission to Syria and Egypt and his public road-building works in Italy. The chronology of the Aquitanian campaign is uncertain. Messalla was appointed consul in 31 BC, in place of Mark Antony, and took part in the Battle of Actium in that year. According to the historian Appian, Octavian sent Messalla to Gaul following the battle. The historian Ronald Syme believed that Messalla became governor of Syria in 30/29 or 29/28, being succeeded as governor in 27 BC by Marcus Cicero junior, son of the orator. The triumphal procession is known to have been held in September 27 BC. A view held by many historians is that the Aquitanian campaign took place early in 27, after the Syrian governorship and immediately before the triumph. An alternative view, however, argued by Knox, is that Messalla carried out the Aquitanian campaign before his governorship of Syria, and delayed his triumph until after his return from Syria. This journey to Syria and Egypt was presumably the journey on which Tibullus fell ill in Corfu, as described in poem 1.3.

Several scholars have noted that the poem forms a symmetrical or chiastic scheme. Ball (1975) describes the poem as follows:

A 1–8 – Proclamation of the happy occasion
B 9-22 – Address to Messalla, with praise of his foreign exploits
C 23–28 – Transition: apostrophe to the Nile
D 29–48 – Hymn to Osiris/Bacchus
C' 49–54 – Transition: apostrophe to Osiris
B' 55–62 – Address to Messalla, with praise of his domestic exploits
A' 63–64 – Exhortation of the Birthday-Spirit

A similar chiastic construction has been noted in other poems of Tibullus, such as 2.5, written in honour of Messalla's son Messallinus, as well as in the Panegyricus Messallae, a poem which similarly praises the achievements of Messalla.

Van der Riet (1998) has a similar scheme, but ends the first section at line 4, the 4th section at line 42, and the 5th section at line 48. He points out that the words gerentem, nitidis, honos 'wearing, shining, honour' in lines 7, 8, 9 are reflected in nitido, gerat, honores in lines 51, 52, 53.

In lines 9–12, if the text non sine me 'not without me' is correct, Tibullus appears to be claiming that he himself had accompanied Messalla on the Aquitanian campaign. An alternative view is that Tibullus is honouring Messalla's conquest by celebrating it in poetry, rather than participating in the campaign.

The author of the anonymous Panegyricus Messallae (107–110) describes his participation in an earlier campaign of Messalla in Illyria in very similar language, leading some scholars to support the view that the Panegyricus was written by Tibullus; most scholars, however, on the grounds of style, reject Tibullus's authorship.

In this poem the Nile, Osiris, and Bacchus seem to be identified with each other, and Osiris in turn is in some ways also identified with Messalla: both wear garlands (1.7.7 and 45), both are the subject of the song (1.7.27 and 61), both have benefitted mankind, especially farmers (1.7.31–44 and 57–62).

Timothy Moore (1989) points out that many of the elements which are treated negatively elsewhere in Tibullus (military campaigns, the invention of agriculture and seafaring, Tyrian purple, the making of roads, and so on) are praised in this poem and presented in a positive light. In this way Tibullus removes the distance between himself and his patron and somehow reconciles contradictory attitudes.

Although poem 4 and poem 7 are ostensibly on quite different subjects, Helena Dettmer (1980) shows that there are nonetheless links between them. Both poems concern gods: Priapus, who is the son of Bacchus (1.4.7) and Osiris, who is identified with Bacchus (1.7.39 and 41). The image of Messalla as an old man surrounded by his children (1.7.56) recalls the image of Tibullus as an old man surrounded by young men who come to him for advice (1.4.80).

A noticeable feature of this poem is that Tibullus nowhere mentions Octavian (or Augustus, as he became in 27 BC), nor indeed anywhere in his poetry, even though Octavian had conquered Egypt only four years earlier. From this it has often been assumed that Tibullus was not a supporter of Augustus.

== Poem 8 – Non ego celari possum ==
=== Summary of poem 8 ===
- 1 Tibullus says that from experience he recognises the signs of love, it is no use trying to hide it. There is no point in arranging one's hair, putting on rouge, trimming one's nails, changing one's clothes and putting on tight shoes.
- 15 The girl is lovely even when not made up and adorned. Tibullus tells his addressee that it is not an old witch's magic incantations that have bewitched him, but the girl's beauty, the touch of her body, and her long kisses.
- 27 Tibullus now addresses the girl and begs her not to be difficult to the boy, and not to ask for gifts – let her grey-haired lover give those! – but to enjoy his youthful good looks. Old age will come soon enough and then she will need cosmetics to hide it. Meanwhile, he begs her not to torment Marathus, who is still very young.
- 51 Tibullus quotes an example of the tearful complaints Marathus has been making to him about the girl's failure to keep her promises.
- 67 Telling Marathus to dry his tears, Tibullus warns Pholoe that the gods will punish her if she carries on like this. He tells her that Marathus also once used to play hard to get, just like she is doing, but now he hates such pride. She will be punished by the gods if she continues her proud behaviour.

=== Notes on poem 8 ===
In this poem it appears that Marathus of poem 4 has fallen in love with a girl. However, Tibullus teases the reader by revealing the situation only gradually; it would be easy for a reader to imagine that the person addressed in lines 1–14, and who is chided for fussing over their hair, clothes, and make up, is female. It is only in line 27 that it becomes clear that the person Tibullus has been talking to is a boy, and it is not until line 49 that we learn that the boy is Marathus. In line 69 we learn that his girlfriend is called Pholoë. Tibullus alternates his advice between the boy and the girl, speaking to each in turn.

As Erika Damer points out, line 8.10 clearly imitates the meaning and even the rhythm and sound (e.g. the syllables dis and comas/koman in the same place in each line) of a line in Callimachus's Hymn "On the Bath of Pallas", in which Callimachus contrasts Pallas Athena's simple beauty with the goddess Aphrodite's artificial adornment. A reader who recognised the imitation could therefore easily be misled at first into thinking that Tibullus is talking to a girl. Tibullus's line is:

saepeque mutatas disposuisse comas
"and often to have changed and rearranged one's hair"

imitating Callimachus's line:

πολλάκι τὰν αὐτὰν δὶς μετέθηκε κόμαν
polláki tàn autàn dìs metéthēke kóman
"and often she altered the same strand of hair twice"

Although some critics have denied that Tibullus was influenced by Callimachus and other Alexandrian poets, Bulloch (1973) notes more than 30 places where scholars have seen echoes of Alexandrian poems, mostly from Callimachus.

From Marathus's tearful complaint it would appear that he has been waiting at home for the girl to visit him, an impression which is confirmed in poem 9, when Tibullus claims to have escorted the girl to Marathus's door.

With its "relaxed, often ironical tone", McGann judges the poem to be "a jeu d'esprit, intended to appeal to the keen wits and worldly sophistication of the reader". Verstraete judges this to be "the masterpiece of the Marathus elegies".

Structurally, the poem can be divided into five sections, each of which is chiastic, and the whole poem is also chiastic. As usual, the chiasms are not always thematic but are often indicated by verbal links: for example, in the second section (15–26), the words carminibus 'spells', herbis 'herbs', cantus 'chants' in lines 17–20 are reflected in reverse order by cantus, carmen, herbas in lines 21–23; while in the fourth section, the words vel 'or', quid 'why', spernis 'you despise', furtiva 'secret', sonum 'sound' in lines 53–58 are reflected in reverse order in strepitu 'noise', clam 'secretly', quid 'what', spernit 'he despises', vel 'or' in lines 60–63.

There are also verbal echoes between sections; for example, deorum, desine, deus, nunc in the first section link to the same or similar words in the fifth; the phrases dedisse oscula, dare oscula, dent oscula 'give kisses' (25–6, 37–8, 58) occur in the second, third, and fourth sections; sonent 'make a sound' (22) and sonum 'sound' (58) also link the second and fourth sections. The words lacrimis 'with tears' (54), miserum ... amantem 'wretched lover' (61), miseros ... amantes 'wretched lovers' (71) and lacrimas 'tears' (73) link the fourth and fifth.

== Poem 9 – Quid mihi si fueras ==
=== Summary of poem 9 ===
- 1 Tibullus chides his addressee for breaking his oaths; though he begs the gods not to punish him, because his beauty excuses him this one time. He explains to the readers that his boy has been captured by gifts. He imagines the punishment he will receive: wind, dust, sun, and a long journey will spoil his looks.
- 17 Tibullus reminds the boy how he had warned him repeatedly that Venus does not look kindly on those who violate love for gifts; and that it would not be any use trying to conceal it. The secret could be revealed at any time by a drunken servant or by someone in their sleep.
- 29 He says he is now ashamed to have been taken in by Marathus's tears and that he foolishly believed him when Marathus had sworn that he would never be won over by gifts, however great.
- 39 He also recalls how when Marathus was in love with a girl, Tibullus had frequently even escorted the girl to his door at night. At that time he had foolishly thought that Marathus still loved him; he had even made poems praising Marathus, which he now bitterly regrets. He brusquely tells the boy to leave him, if he wishes to sell himself for money.
- 53 Tibullus now addresses the rich rival who has won the boy over with gifts, saying he hopes his wife will make a fool of him with constant lovers and refuse to sleep with him. May his sister also have a bad reputation for drunken dinner parties and promiscuous sex.
- 65 The wife has learnt all the tricks. Does the husband think she adorns herself for his benefit? No, it is for a certain young man, and it is not surprising, since girls flee from the embraces of gouty old men.
- 75 Tibullus is astonished that Marathus could bring himself to sleep with such a man. He tells him that he will regret it, when Tibullus gets another boyfriend in his place. He hopes that he may gloat over Marathus's punishment, and dedicate a golden palm-leaf to the goddess Venus to express his gratitude that she has released him from a cheating love.

=== Notes on poem 9 ===
Tibullus speaks to an unnamed male person, chiding him for being unfaithful. Gradually it becomes clear that the person addressed is a boy. The information that he formerly had a girlfriend links this poem to the preceding one, and the mention of gifts links it to 1.4, allowing the reader to guess that it is Marathus. It has also been speculated that the "grey-haired lover" of poem 8.29 and the rival are the same person, that the wife is Pholoë, and the young man she sleeps with is Marathus, but this is not made explicit.

According to Murgatroyd (1977), in the juxtaposition of poems 8 and 9 we see an amusing contrast between Tibullus's role as a detached adviser and the reality of his personal involvement. In Booth's judgement, the two poems "offer ample evidence of sharpness and originality in one who is conventionally regarded as the most anodyne and boring of the Latin elegists".

Poem 9 shares a lot of themes with poem 8. Both poems begin with a reproach of Marathus, each contains a complaint or speech by Marathus himself (1.8.55–66, 1.9.31–36), one in indirect speech, the other direct; both end in tears. Both poems end with a warning of punishment.

Vocabulary items common to both poems include celari/celat (1.8.1, 1.9.3), verbera (1.8.6, 1.9.22), difficilis (1.8.27, 1.9.20), auro (1.8.32, 1.9.17), poena (1.8.77, 1.9.81), superba (1.8.77, 1.9.80), illa = "the girl" (1.8.15, 1.9.40).

Structurally the poem is a ring in seven parts, beginning and ending with mention of Marathus's infidelity and the punishment he will receive. Certain words such as poena (4, 81), meus/noster puer (11, 75), auro (17, 18, 69), nec tibi/non tibi (23, 71), procubuisse/cubet (30, 56), Bacchi/Baccho (34, 61) link together the corresponding sections; but there are also other verbal links such as liquidas aquas, liquida aqua (12, 50) and uretur, ure (15, 21), which are not chiastically placed. The first, third, and last sections (1–16, 29–38, 75–84) are small chiastic rings in their own right within the larger poem, containing their own internal verbal links.

== Poem 10 – Quis fuit horrendos ==
=== Summary of poem 10 ===
==== First ring ====
- 1 Tibullus curses the man who first invented swords, which bring death, and blames this on desire for gold. In the past there were no wars and people slept soundly. Tibullus says he would like to have lived in those days; instead he is being dragged off to wars and is terrified by the trumpets and the enemies' spears.
- 15 He begs the Lares (family gods) to protect him, as they have done since he was a small boy. In those days, when the gods had simple wooden images and were content with simple offerings, people were more faithful.
- 25 He begs the Lares to protect him from war. He promises them in future the sacrifice of a piglet.
- 29 Let another man go to war and be brave, and tell Tibullus about it over a meal afterwards! What madness it is to seek death! There is no corn and wine in the Underworld, but Cerberus and Charon and pale ghosts with burnt hair wandering by the dark lakes. The one who should be praised is not the soldier, but the farmer who lives with his wife to old age in a small cottage. This is how Tibullus wishes to be.

==== Second ring ====
- 45 It is Peace who first enables farming. In peace, the hoe and ploughshare shine, while the soldier's weapons gather rust.
- 53 But when a farmer has had too much to drink, wars of love break out between himself and his wife, with weeping on both sides. But let it be enough for a man to disarrange the girl's hair and tear her clothes, not beat her. Blessed is he who can cause his girl to weep! But the man who raises his hands against his girl should go off to war.
- 67 Tibullus calls on the goddess Peace to come and hold a bunch of corn, and may the folds of her shining robes flow with fruit.

=== Notes on poem 10 ===
==== Structure ====
Structurally, van der Riet analyses the poem as consisting of two large rings or chiastic patterns: 1–44 and 45–68. In the first ring, the two outer panels (1–14 and 29–44) both contrast war and peace, while the two inner panels consist of prayers to the household gods (Lares). The second ring begins and ends with praises of peace (pax), with an account of lovers' wars in between. As in poem 1, which with this poem is linked, the first ring deals mainly with Tibullus's desire for a simple life on the farm, and second with affairs of love (in this poem, the quarrels that may arise between husband and wife).

A 1–14 The horrors of war

B 15–24 Prayer to the Lares for protection
B' 25–28 Prayer to the Lares for protection

A' 29–44 War contrasted with peace (divided 29–38, 39–44)
C 45–50 In praise of Peace

D 51–58 A quarrel between a farmer and his wife
D' 59–66 Tibullus's advice on such quarrels

C' 67–68 Prayer to Peace

The opposite parts of each ring are linked together by verbal echoes. In the first ring, the words quis fuit, mortis, bella (lines 1, 4, 6) are echoed in quis furor, bellis, mortem in line 33; non ... non, dux, oves, arma in 9–12 are echoed by armis, duces, non ... non, oves in 29, 30, 35, 41. In section C, the word Pax (four times in 45–50) is reflected in 67, and in section D Veneris, scissos capillos, flet, manus in lines 51–58 are reflected in the same words or words of similar meaning in section D' (lines 59–66). Van der Riet suggests that also verba ministrat (57) is echoed in verberat (60) because of the similarity of sound.

Further echoes connect the two halves of the poem: primus (1), ferreus (2), tristia ... arma (11–12), bella (7, 13), aluistis (15) and spicea (22) in sections A and B are echoed in primum (45), aluit, alma (47, 67), tristia ... arma (49–50), bella (53), ferrum (59)and spicam (67) in sections C and D; and calidam 'hot' (42) and uxor 'wife' (42) in section A' are reflected in uxorem (52) and calent (53) in section C.

Van der Riet points out that the last part of the first ring, section A' (lines 29–44), is itself a ring, with a number of verbal echoes or contrasts linking together the two halves; for example, sic, dicere facta, aquae in lines 29, 31, 36 are echoed by aquam, sic, facta referre in 42, 43, 44; the lack of corn and vines in the underworld (35) is contrasted with presence of sheep and lambs in the living world (41); and the burnt hair of the dead (37) is contrasted with the white hair of the living (43). Section A is also chiastic, contrasting war (1–4), peace (5–12), and war (13–14).

The centre piece of the poem, with its four-times repeated anaphora of the word pax 'peace', is section C (lines 45–50). Similar anaphoric centre pieces are found in poems 3 (repeated praeda 'loot') and 6 (repeated spes 'hope') of book 2.

==== Links with other poems ====
As well as its internal links, this poem is also linked thematically and verbally to other poems in the collection. Poems 1 and 10, which deal with similar topics, are particularly close, showing a series of parallels in more or less the same order:

Desire for gold leads to warfare (1.1.1–4; 1.10.1–8); war drives away sleep, lack of war enables it (1.1.4, 1.10.10); gods made out of a tree trunk (stipes 1.1.11, stipite 10.17); a garland of corn spikes (corona spicea 1.1.15–16, spicea serta 1.10.22); the Lares addressed (1.1.20, 1.10.15/25); the sacrifice of a lamb or a pig to the Lares (1.1.23, 1.10.26); praise of a herdsman's life (1.1.25–36, 1.10.39–44); making war in love or in reality (bellare 1.1.53, bella 1.10.53); the lover locked out by the door (1.1.56), doors broken down (1.10.54); weeping (flebis ... flebis 1.1.61–63, flet ... flet 1.10.55–56); a soldier of love (1.1.75) versus a real soldier (1.10.65–66).

These parallels make it clear that the transposition of lines 25–32 in poem 1 to follow line 6 of poem 1, adopted by some editors, is unlikely to be correct.

Poem 10 is also linked to poem 6 by the account of the lovers' quarrel (1.6.69–76, 1.10.53–66).

The image of a farmer coming home has already occurred in poem 7 (1.7.61–62, 1.10.51–52). But in this poem the farmer has taken his wife and children to a religious festival in a sacred grove (lucus line 51) and has had too much to drink, whereupon a quarrel breaks out with his wife.

==== A textual problem ====
In line 11, vulgi does not make much sense. Some editors have proposed changing it to Valgi (vocative of Valgius, another poet and friend of Messalla), translating "in that age would I have lived, Valgius". Leah Kronenberg conjectures that the Macer addressed in the final poem of book 2 is a pseudonym for the same Valgius. But O'Hara argues that it is better to adopt the Renaissance conjecture dulcis, translating it "then life would be sweet for me", a similar sentiment to the phrase "then my fates will be sweet" in the fragment of the poetry of Cornelius Gallus discovered in Egypt.

== See also ==
- Tibullus
- Tibullus book 2
- Garland of Sulpicia
- Sulpicia

== Bibliography ==
=== Articles and books cited ===
- Ball, R. J. (1975). "The Structure of Tibullus 1.7". Latomus, 34(Fasc. 3), 729–744.
- Booth, J. (1996). "Tibullus 1.8 and 9: a tale in two poems?". Museum Helveticum, 53(3), 232–247.
- Bright, D. F. (1971). "A Tibullan Odyssey". Arethusa, 4(2), 197–214.
- Bright, D. F. (1984). "The Role of Odysseus in the Panegyricus Messallae". Quaderni Urbinati di Cultura Classica, 17(2), 143–154.
- Bulloch, A. W. (1973). "Tibullus and the Alexandrians". The Cambridge Classical Journal, 19, 71–89.
- Cairns, F. (1979). Tibullus: A Hellenistic Poet at Rome. Cambridge University Press
- Coletta, L. (1984). "Note al Panegyricus Messallae". L'Antiquité Classique, 226–235.
- Dettmer, H. (1980). "The arrangement of Tibullus Books 1 and 2". Philologus, 124(1–2), 68–82.
- Gaisser, J. H. (1971a). "Structure and tone in Tibullus, I.6". The American Journal of Philology, 92(2), 202–216.
- Gaisser, J. H. (1971b). "Tibullus 1.7: A Tribute to Messalla". Classical Philology, 66(4), 221–229.
- Gaisser, J. H. (1983). "Amor, rura and militia in Three Elegies of Tibullus: 1.1, 1.5 and 1.10". Latomus, 42(Fasc. 1), 58–72.
- Günther, H. C. (1997). "Verse transpositions in Tibullus". The Classical Quarterly, 47(2), 501-509.
- Hoffer, S. (2007). "The use of adjective interlacing (double hyperbaton) in Latin poetry". Harvard Studies in Classical Philology, 103, 299–340.
- Huskey, S. J. (2005). "In memory of Tibullus: Ovid's remembrance of Tibullus 1.3 in Amores 3.9 and Tristia 3.3." Arethusa, 38(3), 367–386.
- Keith, A. (2004). "Review of Maltby (2002). Tibullus Elegies". Bryn Mawr Classical Review.
- Knox, P. E. (2005). "Milestones in the Career of Tibullus". The Classical Quarterly, 55(1), 204–216.
- Kronenberg, L. (2018). "Valgius Rufus and the Poet Macer in Tibullus and Ovid". Illinois Classical Studies, Vol. 43, No. 1 (Spring 2018), pp. 179–206.
- Littlewood, R. J. (1970). "The symbolic structure of Tibullus Book I". Latomus, 29 (Fasc. 3), 661–669.
- Lyne, R. O. A. M. (1998). "Propertius and Tibullus: early exchanges". The Classical Quarterly, 48(2), 519–544.
- Maltby, R. (1999). "Tibullus and the language of Latin elegy". In Proceedings of the British Academy (Vol. 93, pp. 377–398).
- McGann, M. J. (1983). "The Marathus Elegies of Tibullus". From the book Band 30/3 Sprache und Literatur (Literatur der augusteischen Zeit: Allgemeines, einzelne Autoren, Fortsetzung). De Gruyter.
- Miller, P. A. (1999). The Tibullan dream text. Transactions of the American Philological Association (1974-), 129, 181–224.
- Miller, P. A. (2011). "Tibullus 1.2: A Postmodern Reading". Atti del Convegno Arcavacata di Rende 4-6 novembre 2009, 99–116.
- Moore, T. J. (1989). "Tibullus 1.7: Reconciliation through conflict". The Classical World, 82(6), 423–430.
- Murgatroyd, P. (1977). "Tibullus and the puer delicatus". In Acta Classica: Proceedings of the Classical Association of South Africa (Vol. 20, No. 1, pp. 105–119).
- Murgatroyd, P. (1994), Tibullus: Elegies II. Oxford
- Musurillo, H. (1970). "Furtivus Amor: The Structure of Tibullus 1.5". In Transactions and Proceedings of the American Philological Association (Vol. 101, pp. 387–399).
- Nikoloutsos, K. P. (2007). "Beyond sex: The poetics and politics of pederasty in Tibullus 1.4". Phoenix, 55–82.
- O’Hara, J. J. (2005). "War and the sweet life: The Gallus fragment and the text of Tibullus 1.10". 11. The Classical Quarterly, 55(1), 317–319.
- Paul, J. M. (2023). "Quicumque Meos Violavit Amores: Romantic Roadblocks and the Inmates of Tartarus in Tibullus 1.3". Classical World. Spring 2023, Vol. 116, Issue 3, pp. 275–297.
- Putnam, M. C. (2005). Virgil and Tibullus 1.1." Classical Philology, 100(2), 123–141.
- Trinacty, C. V. (2017). "Tibullus’ Comedy: A note on Tib. 1.2.87-98". Mnemosyne, 70(6), 1051–1058.
- van der Riet, J. W. (1998). "Meaningful form: parallelism and inverse parallelism in Catullus, Tibullus and Horace" (Doctoral dissertation), Johannesburg.
- Verstraete, B. C. (2005). "The originality of Tibullus' Marathus elegies". Journal of Homosexuality, 49(3–4), 299–313.

=== Editions ===
- André, J. (1965): Tibulle, Elegies: livre premier. Édition, introduction et commentaire. (Collection Érasme.) Paris: Presses Universitaires de France.
- Maltby, R. (2002). Tibullus Elegies. Cambridge.
- Maltby, R. (2012). Elegies: With parallel Latin text. OUP Oxford. With translation by A. M. Juster.
- Murgatroyd, P. (1980). Tibullus I: A commentary on the first book of the Elegies of Albius Tibullus. (Pietermaritzburg).
- Postgate, J. P. (translator) (1912), revised by G. P. Goold (1988). Tibullus. In Catullus, Tibullus, Pervigilium Veneris (Loeb Classical Library volume 6). Harvard.
- Putnam, M. C. J. (1973). Tibullus: A Commentary. University of Oklahoma Press.
