= Valgia gens =

Ancient Roman family

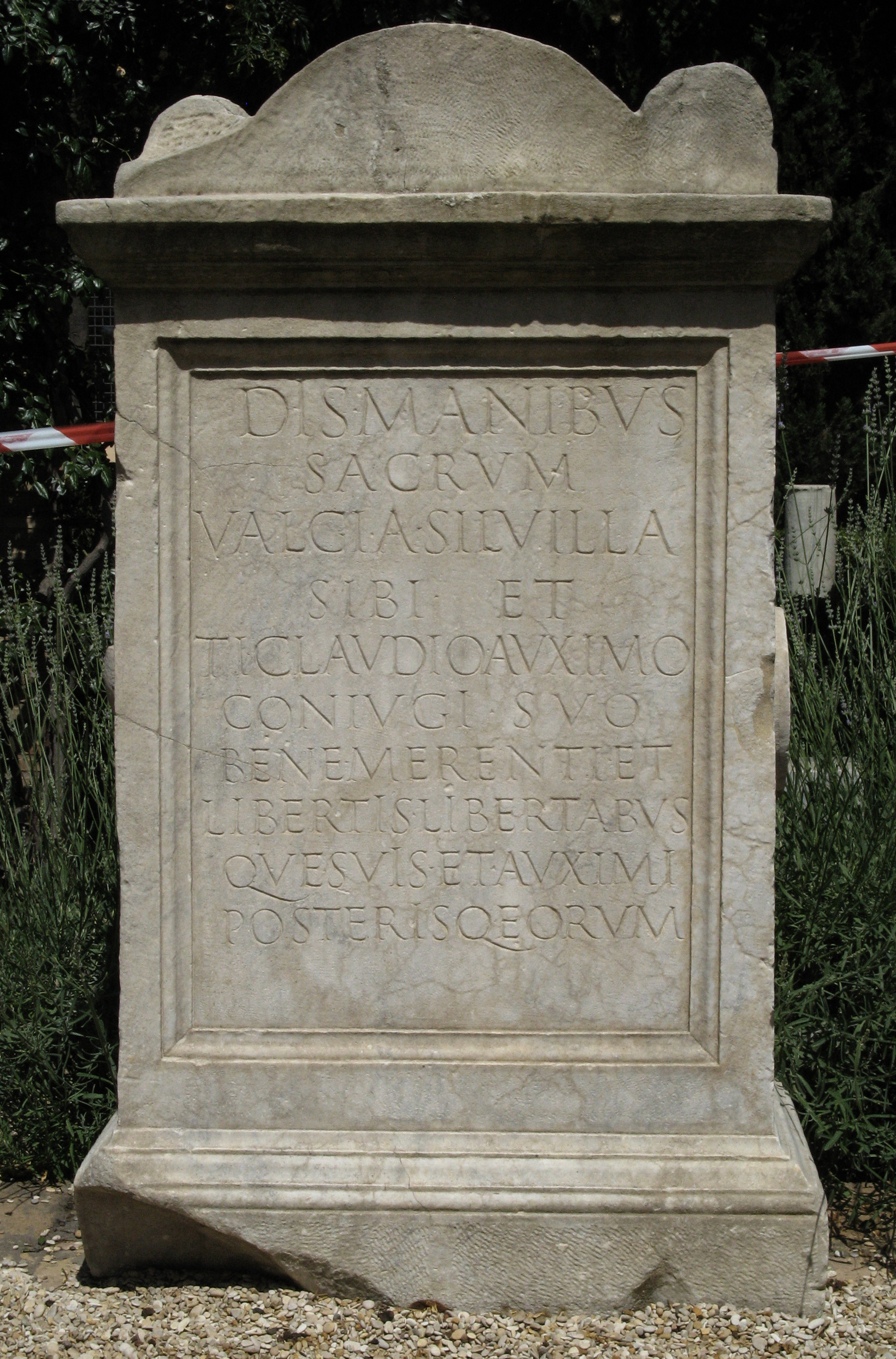
Funerary altar of Valgia Silvilla and Tiberius Claudius Auximus, Rome, first century (Museo Nazionale Romano 80699)

The gens Valgia was a minor plebeian family at ancient Rome. Members of this gens are first mentioned in the final century of the Republic. The most illustrious of the Valgii was Gaius Valgius Rufus, a poet contemporary with Horace, who became consul suffectus in 12 BC.

== Origin ==
The nomen Valgius is derived from the surname Valgus, originally indicating someone with bow legs.

== Branches and cognomina ==
The only cognomen among the Valgii mentioned in Roman authors was Rufus, originally referring to someone with red hair, and belonging to a large class of surnames derived from the physical features of an individual.

== Members ==
This list includes abbreviated praenomina. For an explanation of this practice, see filiation.

- Valgius, a beneficiary of Sulla's proscriptions, through which he obtained considerable property. His son-in-law was Publius Servilius Rullus, the proposer of an agrarian law opposed by Cicero during his consulship in 63 BC.
- Gaius Valgius, adopted a son of Cicero's friend, Quintus Hippius, who became Gaius Valgius Hippianus.
- Gaius Valgius Hippianus, originally the son of Quintus Hippius, was adopted by Gaius Valgius. Cicero recommended him to the magistrates of Fregellae, where Hippianus purchased an estate.
- Aulus Valgius, of a senatorial family, was one of Pompeius' partisans during the Civil War. He went over to Caesar when the war shifted to Hispania in 45 BC.
- Gaius Valgius C. f. Rufus, a poet and contemporary of Horace, Maecenas, and Vergil. Horace praises his intellect and judgment. In 12 BC, he was named consul suffectus, succeeding Marcus Valerius Messalla Appianus, and serving alongside Publius Sulpicius Quirinius.
- Valgia Silvilla, attested in two first-century inscriptions: one recording a dedication to the Bona Dea and another on the funerary altar that she set up for herself and her husband, Tiberius Claudius Auximus.

== See also ==
- List of Roman gentes

== Bibliography ==
- Marcus Tullius Cicero, De Lege Agraria contra Rullum, Epistulae ad Familiares.
- Gaius Julius Caesar (attributed), De Bello Hispaniensis (On the War in Spain).
- Dictionary of Greek and Roman Biography and Mythology, William Smith, ed., Little, Brown and Company, Boston (1849).
- George Davis Chase, "The Origin of Roman Praenomina", in Harvard Studies in Classical Philology, vol. VIII, pp. 103–184 (1897).
- Paul von Rohden, Elimar Klebs, & Hermann Dessau, Prosopographia Imperii Romani (The Prosopography of the Roman Empire, abbreviated PIR), Berlin (1898).
