= Eucheria =

Eucheria was a Roman poet who was active sometime in the late 5th to early 6th centuries AD. Along with Sulpicia, she was a rare example of a Roman female satirist.

One poem of hers survives, an epigram that ridicules a lower-class suitor. The poem is composed of 16 elegiac couplets, which play on the theme of courtship between classes with the juxtaposition of objects of high and low quality, such as a "noble Punic tunic and an awful shaggy rag." Vocabulary in the poem suggests that she may have been from Gaul, particularly the court in Aquitania. Attempts to identify her with historically attested women named Eucheria active in Late Antique Gaul have been inconclusive.
