= Panegyricus Messallae =

Latin hexameter poem in praise of Messalla included with the works of Tibullus

The Panegyricus Messallae, also known as the Laudes Messallae ("Praises of Messalla"), is a 212-line Latin poem in dactylic hexameters included in the 3rd book of the Roman poet Tibullus's collected works. It is a panegyric or praise-poem apparently written to celebrate the installation to the consulship of Tibullus's patron, the Roman aristocrat Marcus Valerius Messalla Corvinus in 31 BC. The poem is numbered 3.7 in the Tibullus collection. It follows the six elegiac poems of "Lygdamus" and is followed by the five elegiac poems known as the Garland of Sulpicia.

Like most of the 20 poems in the 3rd book of Tibullus, its date and authorship are disputed, with scholars disagreeing whether it was written by Tibullus or another member of Messalla's circle around 31 BC, or whether (as many scholars think) it is a piece of pseudepigrapha written by an anonymous author many years later.

The poem has received different critical reactions. According to one scholar, it is "by common consent the least successful work in the Corpus Tibullianum". But it has also been called "brilliant, though excessively rhetorical".

== Summary of the poem ==
The poem has 212 lines. It is the only poem in the Tibullan corpus to be in hexameters rather than elegiac couplets.

1–17 The poet expresses how impossible it is to praise Messalla sufficiently, and how inadequate he is for the task. He gives the examples of Bacchus and Hercules, who deigned to be entertained by humble people.

18–38 Let others make poetry about the construction of the universe. He will sing of how Messalla will outdo even the achievements of his illustrious ancestors. The poet hopes to beat all competition in this.

39–81 Messalla's achievements in warfare and in the forum are equally balanced. He can quieten a crowd and win over a hostile judge. Not even Nestor and Ulysses were as skilled in speaking. – The poet now lists all the adventures of Ulysses up to his landing on Phaeacia and says that though Ulysses' travails were greater, Messalla's eloquence is greater.

82–117 Messalla's prowess in warfare is as strong as his eloquence. The poet enumerates in detail all the different tasks which Messalla has had to perform as general. The poet says he speaks from experience, as the Iapydians, Pannonians, and long-lived Arupini (peoples in the region of Croatia whom Messalla has conquered) can bear witness.

120–134 He predicts that Messalla will achieve even greater things; he calls to witness the unusually sunny and calm weather on the day of Messalla's inauguration, when Jupiter himself appeared on his chariot to hear Messalla's prayers.

135–150 Gaul, Spain, Cyrenaica, Egypt, Parthia, Central Asia, India, Thrace, and the Cimmerian Bosporus will not detain Messalla, but Britain and the southern hemisphere are waiting for Messalla to conquer them.

151–176 The poet describes in detail the five climatic zones of the earth, and says that Messalla alone will be famous in both hemispheres of the world.

177–189 The poet says that the wealthy poet Valgius will praise Messalla better than he can. He complains that he, the author, was once wealthy and had leisure but that his fortune is now much reduced.

190–211 Nonetheless, he will devote himself to Messalla and would be willing to cross the stormy seas, stand in battle, or even throw himself into Mount Etna for him if only Messalla will notice him. Even after his death, whether his life is short or long, or whether he is metamorphosed into a horse, a bull, or a bird, he will never stop singing Messalla's praises.

== Date and authorship ==
Scholars have expressed differing views on the date and authorship of the Panegyricus. Some believe it to date from 31 BC or shortly after, while others, especially some more recent critics, believe it is a work written in the persona of Tibullus, but from a much later period.

=== 31 BC? ===
The ostensible date of the poem is usually taken to be 31 BC. The poet apparently describes the day of Messalla's consular inauguration on January 1 of that year and his earlier campaigns of 35–33 BC in Illyria, but there is no mention of the battle of Actium in September 31 BC, in which Messalla led a squadron, or of Messalla's subsequent campaign in Aquitania, commemorated in Tibullus 1.7. There is also no mention of Octavian (the later emperor Augustus), who was the other consul in 31 BC. There is, however, praise of Valgius Rufus, a poet who was of the same age and social class as Messalla and a member of his circle (he was to become suffect consul in 12 BC).

Although the poem is included with the works of Tibullus, and addressed to Tibullus's patron Messalla, and the complaint about his family's poverty is reminiscent of Tibullus's similar complaint in 1.1.19–22, most scholars do not think it is by Tibullus. William Smith (1851) writes: "The hexameter poem on Messala, which opens the 4th book, is so bad that, although a successful elegiac poet may have failed when he attempted epic verse, it cannot well be ascribed to a writer of the exquisite taste of Tibullus". Funaioli (1952) also argues strongly that the work cannot be by Tibullus. He sees an "abyss" between the terseness and expressive eloquence of Tibullus and the clumsy, obscure, over-allusive style of the Panegyricus.

However, Luigi Coletta (1984) disagrees and argues that the work is indeed by Tibullus. According to Coletta, the difference in style between this and the elegiac poems of books 1 and 2 is due to the fact that the poems are of completely different genres, with the Panegyricus closely imitating the style and wording of Greek hymns such as the Homeric Hymn to Apollo. Coletta also finds a close stylistic similarity between elegy 1.7.9–12 and Panegyricus 106–112, where in both places in similar language the writer claims to have taken part in Messalla's campaigns. According to Coletta's chronology, Tibullus, as befitted a young man of equestrian family, from the age of about 20 accompanied Messalla on various campaigns: to Illyria in 35–33 BC (as described in the Panegyricus), possibly to Actium in 31 BC, to the East in 29 BC (when Tibullus was left behind on the island of Corcyra due to illness), and finally to Aquitania in 28 BC, celebrating Messalla's triumph in 27 BC in elegy 1.7. Coletta sees no contradiction in the chronology or in the poet's attitude towards Messalla that rules out Tibullus as author.

=== 27/26 BC? ===
Schoonhoven (1983), while supporting an early date, argues for a date a few years after 31 BC. He points out that between 30 and 26 BC triumphs were celebrated in Rome over six of the areas mentioned in the poem as being suitable (or, in Schoonhaven's interpretation, unsuitable) for Messalla to conquer; about this time also Cyrenaica had had a political settlement and an embassy had been received from India. He argues therefore that the poet evidently had these countries in mind when he wrote the Panegyric, and was hinting that Messalla would be a suitable commander for the conquest of Britain, which Augustus was proposing to invade in 27 or 26; Schoonhoven thus proposes a date for the poem of late 27 or early 26 BC. He views the poem as written for the occasion of Messalla's triumph in September 27 BC rather than his inauguration on January 1, 31 BC. Another consideration pointed out by Schoonhaven is that lines 117–134 appear to echo and invert Virgil's Georgics 3.491–555, which was not published until 29 BC. Other scholars, however, have not accepted the idea that the poem commemorates Messalla's triumph. Among other reasons, the unusually calm and sunny weather described seems more appropriate to January than to September.

Radford (1923), who believed that both the Panegyricus and the poems of "Lygdamus" which precedes it are the work of the youthful Ovid, also placed the Panegyricus a few years after 31. An evident problem with ascribing the poem to Ovid, however, is the section (177–189) where the poet complains that his estate has been much reduced from its former size: this is reminiscent of similar complaints in Tibullus 1.1.19–22 and Propertius 4.1.127–30, but less appropriate to Ovid, whose family are not known to have lost any property in the confiscations after the civil war. The author of the Panegyricus also claims to have taken part in the Illyrian campaign, for which Ovid, born in 43 BC, would have been far too young.

From a metrical point of view, Bright (1984) points out that there are six lines in the poem in which the beginning of the fifth foot does not coincide with a stressed syllable, which suggests an early date for the poem, since from the time of Virgil onwards such lines were very rare. Duckworth (1966) compares the metrical style of the Panegyricus to the anonymous Ciris, which he places in the republican period.

=== Late date? ===
Maltby (2021), however, disagreeing with Bright and Duckworth, and believes that on metrical and stylistic grounds the poem could not date from the time of Tibullus.

Maltby and other recent scholars, such as Holzberg (1998), Peirano (2012), and Fielding (2015), take the view that the Panegyricus, as well as other works in volume 3 of the Corpus Tibullianum, are pseudepigrapha, written by an anonymous author or authors many years after the time of Messalla. Fielding (2015), for example, argues that because the author apparently refers to Ovid's Metamorphoses, it could not have been written earlier than c. AD 8, and perhaps not until the 2nd century AD.

The parts of the Panegyricus which seem particularly to echo the Metamorphoses are lines 18–23 ("let another poet write a work describing the formation of the world from the four elements") and the end (204–211), which seems to refer to the doctrine of the metempsychosis (reincarnation) of souls. Ovid's Metamorphoses begins with a description of the creation of the world, and much of the last book (15.66–478) is taken up with a long speech of the philosopher Pythagoras discussing the transmigration of souls. There are also verbal correspondences, e.g. nam circumfuso consistit in aëre tellus (Panegyricus 151) resembles nec circumfuso perdebat in aëre tellus (Ovid, Met. 1.12). Maltby also finds echoes of 1st century AD poets such as Manilius, Statius, and Juvenal in the poem.

Summing up, Maltby writes: "Early critics saw it as the work of a young Tibullus and took its purported date as genuine, but since the time of Heyne a date in the late first century AD, possibly by a poet masquerading as Tibullus, has been broadly accepted." Maltby suggests that the poem might have been composed to honour one of Messalla's descendants, such as Lucius Valerius Catullus Messalinus, consul in AD 73, a counsellor of the emperor Domitian.

== Symmetrical construction ==
Overall, as Bright (1984) shows, the poem has a symmetrical composition, with the day of inauguration and Jupiter's epiphany in the centre. In the first half the poet sings of Messalla's achievements in the past, and in the second half he makes predictions about Messalla's achievements in the future. The two "panels" of Ulysses' travels and the five zones balance each other on either side of the centre:

The poet questions whether he is up to the task
Travels of Ulysses
Places conquered by Messalla in the past
Messalla's inauguration: epiphany of Jupiter
Places to be conquered by Messalla in the future
Five climatic zones
The poet questions whether he is up to the task

Bright points out that these two digressions, the account of the wanderings of Ulysses in lines 52–81 and the corresponding account of the five climatic zones of the world in lines 149–176, although on completely different themes, are parallel in construction. In both passages the 3rd line starts with nam 'for'. In the first passage, the words seu supra terras ... seu ... (66) are matched by seu propior terris ... seu ... (159) in the second. Line 70, describing how Ulysses sailed between the twin dangers of Scylla and Charybdis, is matched in the second passage by line 165 which describes how the fertile zone is located between the cold north and torrid south. There are also more subtle connections between the two. For example, Bright suggests that the blinding of Polyphemus in 57 may be picked up by the 'dense shadow' of the polar regions mentioned in line 154, and that the phrase gelida ... irrigat unda 'irrigates with cold water' in 60 corresponds to unda ... riget ... in glaciem 'the water freezes into ice' in lines 155–6, where the verbs irrigat and riget have different meanings but similar sounds. At the end of the first digression (79–80) the poet raises the question of whether Ulysses' adventures took place in the known world or a new one, corresponding to the possibility in the second (176) that Messalla will become famous for conquering an entirely new world. Thus Messalla's achievements in civic life and warfare, which the poet has already compared to weights in the two scales of a balance, are shown in fact to be equal, in an interesting and learned way.

== Characteristics and style ==
The Panegyricus has been described by Radford as "brilliant, though excessively rhetorical". Another scholar, Ceri Davies (1973), calls it "a turgid piece, full of rhetorical embellishment and strained mythological reference". Maltby (2021), however, sees it as entertaining and humorous, parodic in quality: "The often overblown style, inappropriate digressions and irrelevant mythological examples ... all have a role to play in the creation of humour within such a rhetorical context."

An example of its exaggerated rhetorical praise is the following (lines 29–32):

non tua maiorum contenta est gloria fama
nec quaeris quid quaque index sub imagine dicat
sed generis priscos contendis vincere honores
quam tibi maiores maius decus ipse futuris

"Your glory is not content with the fame of your ancestors,
nor do you ask what the label says under each image,
but you strive to outdo the former honours of the family,
yourself a greater glory to your descendants than your ancestors are to you."

Another characteristic of the poem is its fondness for suggesting alternatives, often introduced by seu ... seu "whether ... or..." or by vel ... vel "either ... or", sometimes to parodic effect, as in the following lines (24–27):

at, quodcumque meae poterunt audere camenae
seu tibi par poterunt seu, quod spes abnuit, ultra
sive minus (certeque canent minus), omne vovemus
hoc tibi, nec tanto careat mihi nomine charta.

"But, whatever my Muses will be able to dare,
whether they can achieve the same as you, or whether (what I do not expect) beyond it,
or whether less (and certainly they will sing less!), we will devote all
this to you, and may my paper not lack such a great name."

Noticeable here is also the alliteration: par poterunt ... certeque canent ...hoc tibi nec tanto ... careat charta.

The author displays his extensive knowledge of literature, mythology, geography, and warfare. In a long passage (82–105) he lists all the skills needed by a general, from choosing a suitable camp site to training troops and cavalrymen and drawing up an army for battle. In lines 106–107 the poet claims to have learnt about these things from his own experience. The passage begins (82–85):

nam te non alius belli tenet aptius artes:
qua deceat tutam castris praeducere fossam,
qualiter adversos hosti defigere cervos
quemve locum ducto melius sit claudere vallo...

"For no one else has a surer mastery of the arts of warfare:
where one should draw a safe ditch for a camp,
in what way to plant forked stakes against the enemy,
or what place it is best to close off by building a rampart..."

In his tour of countries of the known world (lines 137–150) he often refers to the different regions by means of erudite allusion rather than naming them directly:

non te vicino remorabitur obvia marte
Gallia nec latis audax Hispania terris;
nec fera Theraeo tellus obsessa colono,
nec qua vel Nilus vel regia lympha Choaspes
profluit aut rapidus, Cyri dementia, Gyndes...

"Gaul, confronting you with nearby war will not detain you,
nor daring Spain with her broad lands;
nor the wild land occupied by the Theraean colonist
nor where the Nile or the royal water Choaspes
pours forth, or the fast-flowing Gyndes, which infuriated Cyrus..."

According to Maltby, the Panegyricus would fit into the category or genre of epideictic rhetoric (one of the three branches of rhetoric outlined in Aristotle's Rhetoric). It is thought that it is deliberately placed 7th in the 3rd book of Tibullus, just as Tibullus's own poem celebrating Messalla's triumph of 27 BC is the 7th poem in the 1st book. According to Ceri Davies, "Its true significance is that it represents a genre of Roman poetry going back to Ennius, who accompanied his patron Marcus Fulvius Nobilior on his campaign against the Aetolians (189 BC), and celebrated the campaign in the poem Ambracia and in his epic on Roman history, the Annales."
