= Garland of Sulpicia =

Group of five Latin elegiac love poems attributed to Tibullus

The Garland of Sulpicia, also sometimes known as the Sulpicia cycle or the Sulpicia–Cerinthus cycle, is a group of five Latin love poems written in elegiac couplets and included in volume 3 of the collected works of Tibullus (Tibullus 3.8–3.12 = Tibullus 4.2–4.6). The five poems concern a love affair between a girl, Sulpicia, and a young man, Cerinthus. They are followed in the collection by a further group of six short elegies ostensibly written by Sulpicia herself describing the same affair.

Sulpicia has been identified as the niece of Tibullus's patron, Marcus Valerius Messalla Corvinus, consul in 31 BC; Cerinthus is thought to be a pseudonym, possibly to be identified with Tibullus's friend, Cornutus, addressed in book 2.2.

As with the other works in volume 3 of the Corpus Tibullianum, the authorship and date of the five poems are much disputed. Some scholars think they may have been written by Tibullus himself or a contemporary of his, while others believe that they are pseudepigrapha written many years later in a Tibullan style.

== The five poems ==
The five poems have 24, 24, 26, 20, and 20 lines respectively. There is some ambiguity about who is speaking. The speaker in poems 1, 3, and 5 is ostensibly the poet, although it may be Cerinthus himself, speaking about himself in the 3rd person. The speaker in poems 2 and 4 is presumed to be Sulpicia. In poem 3, there is also ambiguity about the speaker who addresses Cerinthus, whether it is the god Apollo or the poet.

The cycle of poems is constructed in a symmetrical way. In the first poem, Sulpicia adorns herself for Mars, in the last she adorns herself for Juno. The central poem is a prayer to Apollo. The second and fourth poems are in the voice of Sulpicia herself and contain prayers to Amor and Venus respectively.

=== Poem 1 (3.8) ===
On the 1st March, Sulpicia has adorned herself in honour of the god Mars, and the poet recommends Mars to come and look at her. He declares she is equally beautiful whether she is adorned or not, or whatever she is wearing; like the god Vertumnus she has a thousand different disguises. She alone is worthy to wear Tyrian purple, perfumes from Arabia, and pearls from the Red Sea. The poet asks the Muses and Apollo to celebrate her on the festival, and grant her a long life.

=== Poem 2 (3.9) ===
The speaker (evidently Sulpicia) begins by begging the wild boar to spare her young man, who has gone hunting, and asks the god of love, Amor, to protect him. She expresses her anguish at the dangers he may face. Then, addressing Cerinthus directly, she declares she would like to join him on the hunt and sleep with him in front of the nets. Meanwhile, she begs him to remain chaste, like the hunting goddess Diana, and prays that any girl who tries to seduce him may be torn to pieces by the wild animals. She begs him to leave hunting to his father, and return to her quickly.

=== Poem 3 (3.10) ===
The speaker addresses the god of healing, Apollo, and begs him to come and cure the girl's illness; he asks him not to torment her young man, who is saying countless prayers for her. Addressing Cerinthus, the god (or the poet) tells him to put aside his worries: a god does not harm lovers. There is no need for tears – unless the young man himself is unfaithful! As for the girl, she loves him alone and he need not fear any rivals. The speaker then addresses Apollo again, thanking him for saving the girl, and thus saving the young man as well.

=== Poem 4 (3.11) ===
Addressing Cerinthus on his birthday, Sulpicia tells him how much she loves him, hoping however that he loves her equally. She prays first to Cerinthus's genius (personal protective deity) and then to the goddess of love, Venus, to make sure that Cerinthus is never unfaithful but loves her with mutual love. She begs that Cerinthus himself may pray for the same thing, but in secret, to preserve his modesty.

=== Poem 5 (3.12) ===
On her birthday, the docta puella ("learned girl", i.e. Sulpicia) has dressed herself up in honour of the goddess Juno (but secretly to please her young man). The poet calls on the goddess to bless the pair and make sure they love each other with equal passion. He tells the goddess that the girl is on fire with love, but has no wish to be cured. He ends by asking the goddess to ensure that they may still love each other in a year's time.

== Identities of Sulpicia and Cerinthus ==
In poem 3.13 Sulpicia calls herself "Sulpicia daughter of Servius" (Servi filia Sulpicia), and in poem 3.13 she addresses Messalla (presumably Tibullus's patron Marcus Valerius Messalla Corvinus, consul in 31 BC) as propinque "relative". On this basis Haupt (1871) identified Sulpicia as the granddaughter of Cicero's friend, Servius Sulpicius Rufus (consul 51 BC), who died in 43 BC, whose son is said to have married Messalla's sister. If so, Sulpicia would have been Messalla's niece. Some scholars write that she was Servius Sulpicius Rufus's daughter; if so, this would make Messalla her brother-in-law.

Cērinthus, from the Greek κήρινθος "bee bread", is thought to be a synonym. Because of the similarity of consonants (c, r, n, t), as well as the metrical equivalence of the two names, and the resemblance between Greek κέρας keras "horn" and Latin cornu "horn", it has been suggested that Cerinthus may be the same as the friend, Cornutus, to whom Tibullus addresses a birthday poem (Tibullus 2.2), as well as a longer poem (2.3). The close verbal echoes between 2.2 and some of the poems in the Garland (see below) are also suggestive that the works are in some way connected and that Cornutus and Cerinthus are the same person. One suggestion (if the Garland dates from the time of Tibullus) is that the Garland may have been written to celebrate the anniversary of Sulpicia and Cornutus's marriage.

However, the question is made more complicated by the fact that Horace, in Satire 1.2.81, addresses a young man called Cerinthus, advising him that it is safer to have sex with a freedwoman than a rich lady. Since book 1 of the Satires was written about 35 BC, it seems unlikely that Horace's Cerinthus is the same as Tibullus's Cornutus, despite the similarity of the situation. Robert Maltby, who believes that the Sulpicia poems and the Garland were not written in the time of Tibullus but much later, argues that the persona of "Cerinthus" is a literary construct invented on the basis of Tibullus 2.2 and Horace.

== Thematic links ==
As well as the obvious connection between the Garland and the six poems of Sulpicia herself which follow them in the collection, there are a number of further thematic links between the Garland and other poems in the Corpus Tibullianum, which make it likely that the 3rd book is not a random anthology of poems but composed deliberately as an interconnected group.

For example, the theme of a birthday celebration (3.11 and 3.12) recurs in Sulpicia 3.14 and 3.15, as well as in Tibullus's 1.7 (to Messalla) and 2.2 (to Cornutus). The theme of Sulpicia's illness in 3.10 and 3.17, is paralleled in the poems about the illnesses of Tibullus (1.3) and of Lygdamus (3.5). The first poem of the Garland (3.8) and the first poem of Lygdamus (3.1) both open by celebrating the festival of Matronalia on the 1st March.

There are also several verbal echoes in the Garland with Tibullus 2.2 (the birthday poem for Cornutus). For example, the chains (vincla) which Sulpicia prays may bind her and Cerinthus in 3.9 and 3.11 in the Garland echo the vincula which Tibullus prays may join Cornutus and his wife in 2.2. The incense burning on the altar in the birthday poem for Sulpicia (3.12.1) echoes the incense burnt on the altar in 2.2.3; similarly the sweet-smelling Arabian perfumes and pearls collected by "Indians" from the Red Sea in 3.8 echo those mentioned in similar verses in 2.2.

Some of the themes in the Garland also have echoes of poems written by other poets, especially Ovid. Maltby draws attention to the story of Cephalus and Procris in Ovid's Metamorphoses (7.661ff) with regard to poem 3.9, with its theme of the young man's suspected unfaithfulness while on the hunt, and the letter which Ovid imagines was sent by Phaedra to Hippolytus (Ovid, Heroides 4.41–44), in which Phaedra expresses her desire to join Hippolytus in the hunt.

Jacqueline Fabre-Serris similarly points out the many words shared in common between 3.9 and Virgil's Eclogue 10, Tibullus 1.4 (lines 49-50), and Propertius 2.19. Propertius 3.13 and Ovid Heroides 4, 5, and 15 do not share words with Tibullus 3.9, but there is a shared theme of sleeping together in the open air, which is perhaps derived from the lost poetry of Cornelius Gallus.

== Date and authorship ==
After a detailed study of the metre of the elegiac poems of the Corpus Tibullianum, the French scholar Augustin Cartault (1911) came to the conclusion that metrically at least, there is nothing to separate the style of the Garland of Sulpicia (3.7–12) and the last two poems in the book (3.19–20) from the genuine poems of Tibullus; but the six poems of Sulpicia (3.13–17), while in Cartault's view not inferior in technique to Tibullus's, are sufficiently different to indicate a different writer. According to Cartault, the six poems of "Lygdamus" (3.1–6) are by another writer again.

Despite such arguments, several recent critics, such as Tränkle (1990), Holzberg (1998), and Maltby (2021), have supported the idea that the poems of book 3 are not by Tibullus and his contemporaries but pseudepigrapha, written many years later. They base their belief on the argument that all the poems of book 3, except those of Sulpicia, appear to show the influence of the later poems of Ovid.

Not all scholars agree. For example, in his review of Trānkle, J. L. Butrica writes: "conceivably (Tränkle) is right in all his contentions, but it is still possible to believe that these poems are precisely what they seem to be, a celebration of Messalla's consulship and the love-poetry of family members."
