= Lygdamus =

Lygdamus (probably a pseudonym) was a Roman poet who wrote six love poems in Classical Latin. His elegies, five of them concerning a girl named Neaera, are preserved in the Appendix Tibulliana alongside the apocryphal works of Tibullus. In poem 5, line 6, he describes himself as young and in 5.18 gives his birth year as the year "when both consuls died by equal fate" (that is, 43 BC). This line, however, is identical to one in Ovid's Tristia from AD 11, and it has been much debated by scholars. One suggestion, supported by the numerous features of vocabulary and style shared between Lygdamus and Ovid, is that "Lygdamus" is merely a pen name used by the young Ovid. Some more recent scholars, however, have argued that Lygdamus lived much later than Ovid and imitated his style. No other author mentions Lygdamus, making the mystery of his real identity all the more difficult.

Unlike Tibullus's Delia and Nemesis, Neaera appears not to have been a courtesan, but is described by the poet as his wife, who left him for another man.

== Lygdamus and Neaera ==
The name "Lygdamus" was a common slave-name in Rome, and is used as a slave name by Propertius. It has been conjectured that the author may have chosen this pen name to indicate that he is a "slave of love". Judging from the expensive perfumes to be used at his funeral, Lygdamus appears to come from a well-to-do family.

The name "Neaera" is common in Greek mythology and is also thought to be a pseudonym. It first occurs in Homer's Odyssey 12.111, and it is also found in Virgil's Eclogue 3.3, Horace's Epodes 15.11 and Odes 3.14.21, and Ovid's Amores 3.6.

Neaera is a very different kind of woman from Tibullus's Delia and Nemesis. The latter two are apparently courtesans, who keep their lovers waiting outside the door while they entertain other lovers inside. Both girls, especially Nemesis, demand expensive gifts.

Neaera is clearly not a courtesan. She comes from a cultured family (4.92) and the author knows her "very kind" mother and "most amiable" father (4.93–94). The author considers her to be his wife (2.30) and her mother to be his mother-in-law (2.14). The author prays not only to Venus but also to Juno, the goddess of marriage, to help him (3.33–34); similarly Neaera swears by both goddesses that she loves him (6.48). She appears to have left him and he prays for her return (3.27). The awful news he hears in a dream from Apollo is that she is planning to marry someone else (4.58, 4.80). The opening couplet of poem 2 indicates that the two loved each other, but a third person caused them to separate. In the last poem the poet chides Neaera for her perjury (6.47–50) and her unfaithfulness (55) but declares that, though he is now over his passion for her, he wishes her well (6.29–30) and she is still dear to him (56).

Though it is possible to take the view that the author was originally married to Neaera, other possibilities exist and have been adopted by various scholars. One view is that they were merely lovers but that the author wished Neaera to eventually become his wife. Another hypothesis is that they were betrothed, but that Neaera broke off the engagement.

== The poems ==
The six poems are of different lengths: 28, 30, 38, 96, 34, and 64 lines respectively. The lengths of the poems can be arranged as follows:

1 + 2 + 3 = 96 lines
4 = 96 lines
5 + 6 = 98 lines

Thus the 4th poem, as well as being the longest, is the centre of the series.

=== Poem 1 ===
On 1st March, the festival of Matronalia, the poet asks the Muses to advise him what present he should give to Neaera. They advise him give her a book of poems, but it should be well presented in a yellow sleeve. He begs the Muses to go and give the book to his beloved Neaera, and says that he wishes to know whether in future he is to be her husband, as he once was, or merely her brother.

=== Poem 2 ===
The poet declares that he cannot bear living without his wife. He imagines Neaera and her mother attending his funeral and pouring expensive perfume on his bones after cremation. He ends by imagining his epitaph: "Lygdamus lies here: grief and the love of Neaera, his wife, who was taken away from him, were the cause of his death."

=== Poem 3 ===
Addressing Neaera, the poet asks what is the use of praying, even though he is not praying for wealth, but merely to spend his life until old age with Neaera. He prays to Juno and Venus to help him and says that if he can't have Neaera he would prefer to die.

=== Poem 4 ===
Lygdamus describes an awful dream he had the night before in which Apollo appeared to him and told him that Neaera prefers to be another man's girlfriend. In the dream Apollo assures him that this is all part of the trials of love and she can still be won round if he entreats her. The poet tells Neaera he cannot believe she would be so heartless, especially as she was brought up in a respectable family with delightful parents.

=== Poem 5 ===
The poet imagines his friends enjoying a holiday in a thermal spa in Etruria, while he himself has been ill with a fever and close to death for two weeks. He begs Persephone, goddess of the dead, to spare him, since he has committed no sacrilege, crime, or blasphemy and is still young. He ends by asking his friends to remember him and to sacrifice some black sheep on his behalf to Dis, god of the Underworld. Neaera is not mentioned in this poem.

=== Poem 6 ===
The poet calls on Liber (Bacchus), the god of wine, and orders his slave to pour wine and his friends to join him. He declares he no longer loves Neaera, but wishes her to be happy. He warns his friends not to make his mistake of falling in love and states that though Neaera is unfaithful she is still dear to him. He warns his friends not to believe girls who swear that they are faithful. At the end of the poem he asks the boy to pour more wine, refusing to spend any more nights sighing with anxiety.

== Date and authorship ==
Apart from a mention of Catullus (who died in the 50s BC), no historical person or event is mentioned in Lygdamus's poems, making them difficult to date except on literary grounds. Early commentators on the Lygdamus poems assumed that the author was Tibullus, the couplet mentioning the poet's birth in the year 43 BC being assumed to be an interpolation, not part of the original text. J. H. Voss (1786) was the first to question the Tibullan authorship of the poems. Other scholars also noted metrical, stylistic, and linguistic differences between Lygdamus and the genuine poems of Tibullus, making it clear that Tibullus could not be the author. Voss, who took a poor view of the quality of the poems, suggested that they were written by a freedman born in the same year as Ovid.

Gruppe (1839), however, was the first to suggest that Lygdamus was a pseudonym for Ovid himself. This idea was taken up by Radford (1926) and others, who noted in detail the large number of words and phrases which are common to Lygdamus and Ovid but not found or rarely found in other authors. There are also features of style which are typical of Ovid but not of other poets; such as lines of the form "adjective, -que, noun, adjective, -que, noun", as in Castaliamque umbram Pieriosque lacus "the Castalian shade and the Pierian lakes", or the placing of a monosyllable + -que (e.g. inque, isque) at the beginning of a pentameter. Another argument supporting this view is that the circumstances described in the poems seem to fit Ovid's biographical details very well, as described in his autobiographical poem Tristia 4.10 (he was born in 43 BC; the poet seems fairly wealthy; Neaera is described as his wife, whose parents he knows; Ovid states that his marriage to his second wife lasted only a short time before she married another man). The reasons for Ovid writing anonymously are plausibly explained by Radford by the fact that his father wished him to follow a career in politics and apparently repeatedly discouraged him from writing poetry.

If the poems were written by Ovid, according to Radford, since they contain echoes of Horace's Odes and Ars Poetica as well as various parts of Virgil's Aeneid, it would seem that they date from 19 BC or 18 BC, when Ovid was about 24 or 25 years old.

Despite these arguments, some more recent scholars have argued that Lygdamus was not Ovid, but someone who imitated him. A. G. Lee (1958) argued that in several places where similar phrases occur in both Lygdamus and Ovid, in each case the phrase is more appropriate in the Ovidian context. He also noted certain items of vocabulary which are generally not found in the time of Tibullus, such as the adjective Erythraeus referring to the Indian Ocean. On this basis he conjectured that the date of Lygdamus may have been in the late 1st century AD. Navarro Antolín (1996) and Maltby (2021) take a similar view.

A third possibility, that Lygdamus was an earlier poet who was imitated by Ovid, though held by some scholars, is thought to be less probable. Peter White (2002) writes: "the coincidences between (Ovid and Lygdamus) make it much likelier that Lygdamus is either the youthful Ovid or a later writer impersonating the young Ovid."

== Metre ==
The poems are written in elegiac couplets, the usual metre for Latin love poetry from the time of Cornelius Gallus (d. 26 BC) onwards, and which were also used by Propertius and Tibullus.

Metrically, the poems can be divided into two groups. Poems 1, 2, 3, and 6 are more dactylic: in these the proportion of dactylic feet (not counting the ending of each line, which doesn't vary) is 45%, whereas in poems 4 and 5 it is only 37%. The reason for this is not known, unless it might be the rather sombre subject matter of these poems.

Detailed metrical studies have shown that the Lygdamus poems were clearly written by a different poet than those of Tibullus. One of the more obvious differences is that in Lygdamus the caesura of the hexameter is almost always a masculine caesura in the 3rd foot, whereas in Tibullus it varies between the 3rd foot and the 4th.

== Style ==
A technique common in Tibullus, Ovid, and other poets of the period is also found in Lygdamus, namely the creation of a chiastic structure (also known as "ring composition") in a poem by the use of verbal and thematic echoes. Thus in poem 1, the words hic, munera, dicite, seu...seu, cara, Neaera in the first six lines are repeated in the last six; libellum 'little book' is found in 9 and 17. In addition, the genitive Martis 'of Mars' in the first line is balanced by Ditis 'of Dis' in the last; the colours yellow and white, mentioned in 9, are matched by the word color in 18; and opus 'work' in 14 is matched by carminis 'poem' in 15.

Similarly in poem 2, the words dolor (dolorem), erepta (eripuit), coniuge in the first four lines are repeated as dolor, ereptae, coniugis in the last four; while candida, ossa, nigra in line 10 are repeated in lines 17–18.

In poems 3, 4, and 5 chiastic verbal and thematic echoes are found mostly at the beginning and ends of the poems. The structure of poem 4 as a whole is chiastic (the poet's reaction to the dream, the dream itself, the poet's reaction to the dream). Within the dream section lines 63–76 form a chiastic structure of their own, with the myth of Apollo and Admetus at the centre.

In poem 6 has chiastic echoes more widely spread, for example quid precor a demens? in 27 vs. quid queror infelix? in 37; and the myth of Agave in 24 vs. the myth of Ariadne in 39, clearly marking 29–37 as the centre of the poem.

Maltby notes that verbal echoes are also used to link poems together. For example, caram 'dear' and coniunx 'wife' in the last four lines of poem 1 are found again as caram and coniuge in the first four lines of poem 2.

Poem 5 has clear verbal echoes of Tibullus 1.3, in which Tibullus, like Lygdamus, is ill and imagines he may die.

== Editions ==
- Maltby, R. (2021). Book Three of the Corpus Tibullianum: Introduction, Text, Translation and Commentary. Cambridge Scholars Publisher.
- Navarro Antolín, F. (translated by Zoltowski, J. J.) (1996). Lygdamus (Corpus Tibullianum III.1-6 Lygdami Elegiarum Liber). Mnemosyne, Supplements, Volume 154. Brill.
