= Paraklausithyron =

Motif in Greek literature

Paraklausithyron (Ancient Greek: παρακλαυσίθυρον) is a motif in Greek and especially Augustan love elegy, as well as in troubadour poetry.

The details of the Greek etymology are uncertain, but it is generally accepted to mean "lament beside a door", from παρακλαίω, "lament beside", and θύρα, "door". A paraklausithyron typically places a lover outside his mistress's door, desiring entry. In Greek poetry, the situation is connected to the komos, the revels of young people outdoors following intoxication at a symposium. Callimachus uses the situation to reflect on self-control, passion, and free will when the obstacle of the door is removed.

Latin poetry offers several examples and variations on the exclusus amator ("shut-out lover") theme. Horace offers a less-than-serious lament in Odes 3.10 and even threatens the door in 3.26; Tibullus (1.2) appeals to the door itself; in Propertius (1.16), the door is the sole speaker. In Ovid's Amores (1.6), the speaker claims he would gladly trade places with the doorkeeper, a slave who is shackled to his post, as he begs the door-keeper to allow him access to his mistress, Corinna. In the Metamorphoses, the famous wall (invide obstas) with its chink (vitium) that separates the star-crossed lovers, Pyramus and Thisbe, seems to be an extension of this motif. The appeal of the paraclausithyron derives from its condensing of the situation of love elegy to the barest essentials: the lover, the beloved and the obstacle, allowing poets to ring variations on a basic theme. This feature of amatory poetry may owe its origin to Greek New Comedy; as is often the case scholars look to Roman comedy to supply the deficiencies of the highly fragmentary remains of the Greek models and in lines 55 to 65 of Plautus' Curculio is a specimen of a short but nonetheless completely bona fide paraklausithyron.

After Ovid, the genre disappears from Latin poetry.

The motif is not merely a historical phenomenon: it continues in contemporary songwriting. Steve Earle's song "More Than I Can Do," for example, gives a typical paraklausithyronic situation with such lines as "Just because you won't unlock your door /That don't mean you don't love me anymore" as does his song "Last of the Hardcore Troubadours," in which the singer addresses a woman, saying "Girl, don't bother to lock your door / He's out there hollering, "Darlin' don't you love me no more?" Similarly, the first two verses of Jimi Hendrix's "Castles Made of Sand" involve paraklausithyronic situation of a man kicked out by his lover. Likewise, Bob Dylan's song "Temporary Like Achilles" contains many features typical of the ancient motif (lament at the door, long wait, presence of a guard as a further obstacle, etc.) and recalls the pathos and rhetoric of the Roman elegiac paraclausithyron. The motif is also central to The Beatles' "The Long and Winding Road" (1970). In the song, Paul McCartney describes an unrequited lover’s journey, which culminates at the beloved's "door." The plea "Don't leave me waiting here / Lead me to your door" echo the classic paraklausithyron tradition of the weary lover petitioning for entry and lamenting the emotional distance symbolized by the physical threshold.

== Sources ==
- Cairns, Francis (1972). Generic composition in Greek and Roman poetry. Edinburgh, University Press.
- Canter, H. V. (1920). "The paraclausithyron as a literary theme". The American Journal of Philology, 41(4), 355–368. JSTOR 289473 doi:10.2307/289473
- Copley, F. O. (1942, January). "On the origin of certain features of the Paraclausithyron". Transactions and Proceedings of the American Philological Association (pp. 96–107). JSTOR 283540 doi:10.2307/283540
- Cummings, Michael S. (1997) Observations on the development and code of pre-elegiac paraklausithuron. Thesis (Ph.D.) – University of Ottawa. Summary in : DA 1997–1998 58 (10) : 3914A. Microform available from : University Microfilms International, Ann Arbor (Mich.), no. AAT NQ21961.
- Thomas, Richard F. (1979), "New Comedy, Callimachus, and Roman Poetry", Harvard Studies in Classical Philology, Vol. 83, pp. 179–206.
- Walker, Janet A. (1979). "Conventions of Love Poetry in Japan and the West" The Journal of the Association of Teachers of Japanese, Vol. 14, No. 1 (Apr., 1979), pp. 31–65.
