= Sulpicia =

Ancient Roman poet

Sulpicia is believed to be the author, in the first century BCE, of six short poems (some 40 lines in all) written in Latin which were published as part of the corpus of Albius Tibullus's poetry (poems 3.12–17). She is one of the few female poets of ancient Rome whose work survives.

== Life ==
Sulpicia has been tentatively identified as the granddaughter of Cicero's friend Servius Sulpicius Rufus, whose son of the same name married Valeria, sister of Marcus Valerius Messalla Corvinus, an important patron of literature who also launched the career of Ovid. If this is correct, Sulpicia's family were well-off citizens with connections to Emperor Augustus, since her uncle Messalla (consul in 31 BC) served as a commander for Augustus.

== Poetry ==
Carmina Sulpiciae, read in Latin

Sulpicia's surviving work consists of six short elegiac poems (3.13–18), which have been preserved as part of a collection of poetry, book 3 of the Corpus Tibullianum, initially attributed to Tibullus. The poems are addressed to Cerinthus.

Cerinthus was most likely a pseudonym, in the style of the day (like Catullus's Lesbia and Propertius's Cynthia). Cerinthus has sometimes been thought to refer to the Cornutus addressed by Tibullus in two of his Elegies, probably an aristocratic Caecilius Cornutus. The similarity in consonants and the resemblance between the Greek κέρας (keras, 'horn') and Latin cornu (also 'horn') are among arguments cited in favour of this identification. Recent criticism, however, has tended away from attempting to identify Cerinthus with an historical figure in favour of noting the literary implications of the pseudonym.

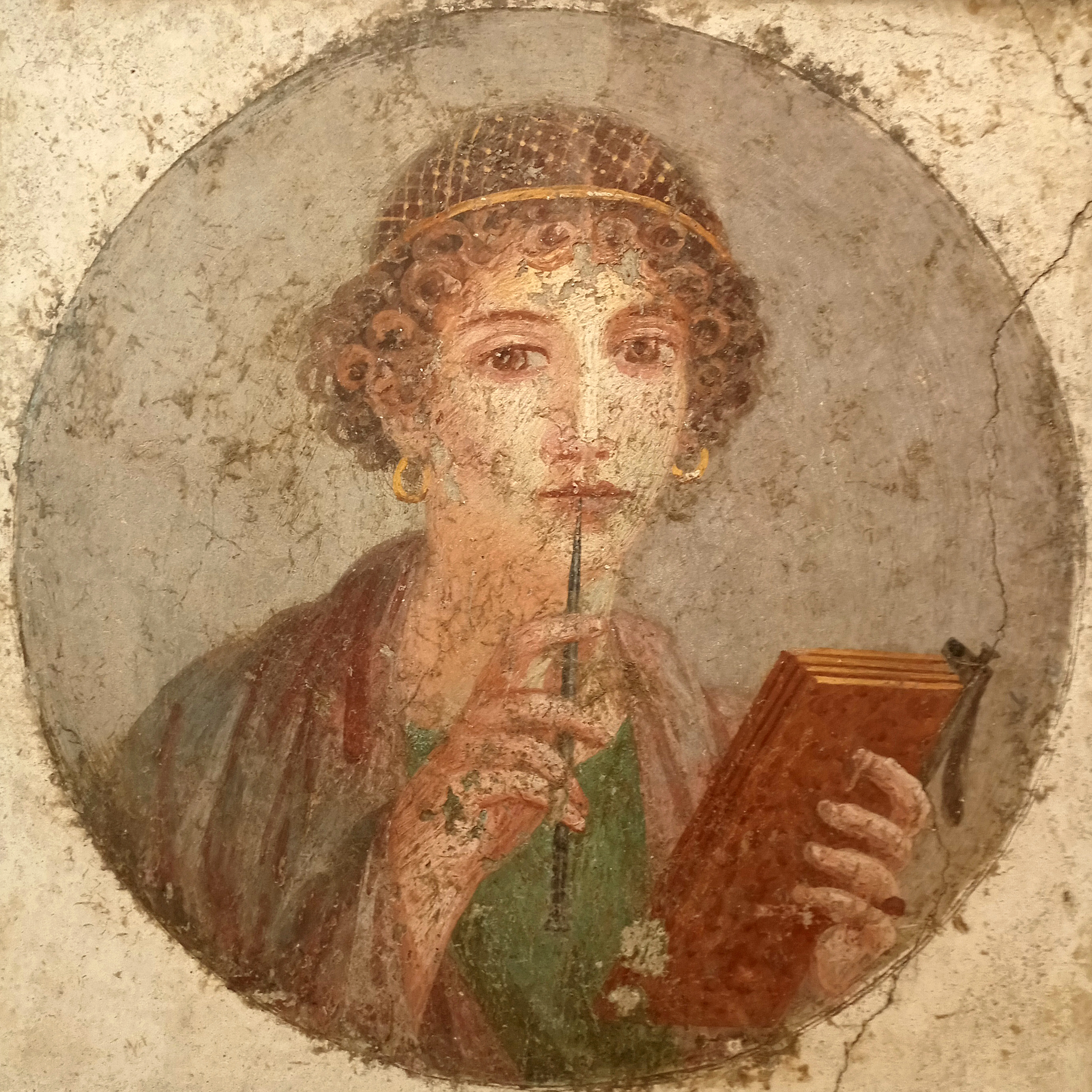
This fresco from Pompeii, c. AD 50–79, is traditionally identified as Sappho.

Some critics, such as Thomas Hubbard, Thomas Habinek, and Niklas Holzberg have challenged the view that the Sulpicia poems were authored by a woman. In an overview of Sulpician criticism, Alison Keith described the logic of Hubbard's article as "tortuous" and also highlights problems in Holzberg and Habinek's attempts to efface female authorship. In contrast, Judith P. Hallett argues for increasing the numbers of poems attributed to Sulpicia to include poems 8–12 from the Corpus Tibullianum, which had previously been attributed to an amicus Sulpiciae (friend of Sulpicia). Laurel Fulkerson, in her 2017 commentary on the Appendix Tibulliana, presents arguments on both sides of the debate and concludes that, while the question cannot be answered based on the existing evidence, “much is gained, and little lost, in treating the poetry of Sulpicia as an authentically recovered female voice from antiquity”. Another recent commentator, Robert Maltby, although not ruling out that the poems may have been written by a woman, believes that they date to a much later era and cannot be attributed to the niece of Messalla.

While academics traditionally regarded Sulpicia as an amateur author, this view was challenged by Santirocco in an article published in 1979, and subsequently the literary merit of this collection of poems has been more fully explored.

== The poems ==
The six poems of Sulpicia are all very short: 10, 8, 4, 6, 6, and 6 lines respectively. Nonetheless they tell the complete story of a love-affair with all the usual incidents: falling in love, temporary separation, the unfaithfulness of one partner, the illness of the other, and the reassertion of love. As Maltby (2021) points out, there is a neat ring-structure to the series: "The regret at hiding her passion in the concluding poem 18 echoes her willingness finally to reveal her love in the introductory 13".

The poems appear in the Corpus Tibullianum as poems 3.13 to 3.18. They are preceded in the Corpus Tibullianum by five poems known as the Garland of Sulpicia, which concern the same relationship between Sulpicia and Cerinthus.

=== Poem 1 ===
Sulpicia expresses her delight that love has come at last (tandem vēnit amor) and Venus has granted her prayer. She is happy to be able to make her love public rather than keep quiet about it out of modesty.

=== Poem 2 ===
Sulpicia complains about a birthday when her uncle Messalla is planning to take her to the country, and she will have to spend the day sadly without Cerinthus. She tells Messalla that she will go but she will leave her mind and heart behind.

=== Poem 3 ===
Sulpicia informs her lover that the unwelcome trip has been cancelled. She hopes that they can all celebrate the birthday together, an unexpected treat.

=== Poem 4 ===
Sulpicia sarcastically thanks her lover for being so confident of her love as to have an affair with a whore or "wool-basket carrying maid" in preference to "Servius's daughter Sulpicia" She tells him that her family are anxious for her, and are very pained to see her fall for a person of low birth.

=== Poem 5 ===
Sulpicia asks Cerinthus if he cares for her at all, when she is ill with a fever. She says that if her lover is so indifferent to her health, she would prefer not to recover.

=== Poem 6 ===
Calling him "my light" (mea lux), Sulpicia tells her lover that she has never done anything so foolish as she did the previous night when she refused to sleep with him for fear of making her love to him too obvious.

== Translations ==
- Perseus Project – Translation by Anne Mahoney
- Poems of Sulpicia I translated, with an Introduction, Notes, and Glossary by Jon Corelis
- Translation by Lee Pearcy

== Editions ==
- Fulkerson, L. (2017). A literary commentary on the elegies of the Appendix Tibulliana. (Oxford University Press).
- Maltby, R. (2021). Book Three of the Corpus Tibullianum: Introduction, Text, Translation and Commentary. Cambridge Scholars Publisher.

== See also ==
- Sulpicia (gens)
- Sulpicia Lepidina
- CIL 4.5296
