= Valgius Rufus =

Roman senator

Gaius Valgius Rufus was a Roman senator, and a contemporary of Horace and Maecenas. He succeeded Marcus Valerius Messalla Corvinus as suffect consul upon the latter's death in 12 BC. Rufus is best known as a writer of elegies and epigrams, and his contemporaries believed him capable of great things in epic writing. The author of the panegyric on Messalla Corvinus compared Rufus as the equal of Homer.

Rufus did not confine himself to poetry. He discussed grammatical questions by correspondence, translated the rhetorical manual of his teacher Apollodorus of Pergamon, and began a treatise on medicinal plants, dedicated to Augustus. Horace addressed to him the ninth ode of the second book of his poems.

Political offices
Preceded by Marcus Valerius Messalla Appianus and Publius Sulpicius Quirinius as ordinary consuls	Suffect consul of the Roman Empire; 12 BC	Succeeded by Gaius Caninius Rebilus and Lucius Volusius Saturninus as suffect consuls
