= Wunderlich =

Wunderlich may refer to:

- 20347 Wunderlich, a main-belt asteroid
- Wunderlich (vacuum tube), vacuum tube radio detector from the early 1930s
- Wunderlich (panels), decorative panels used in Australian architecture, often as ceilings
- Wunderlich Intermediate School, Klein Independent School District, Texas, USA
- Wunderlich Act, a 1954 United States law regarding federal government administration

== People with the surname ==
- Agathon Wunderlich (1810–1878), German jurist
- Alfred Wunderlich (1901–1963), German politician
- Ann Grossman-Wunderlich (born 1970), professional tennis player
- Bernd Wunderlich (figure skater), German figure skater
- Bernd Wunderlich (footballer) (born 1957), German footballer
- Carl Reinhold August Wunderlich (1815–1877), German physician and psychiatrist, internist
- Christian Wunderlich (born 1979), German singer and actor
- Claudia Wunderlich (born 1956), German handball player
- Dieter Wunderlich (1937-2026), German linguist
- Erhard Wunderlich (1956–2012), German handball player
- Eric Wunderlich (born 1970), American breaststroke swimmer
- Ernst Karl Friedrich Wunderlich (1783–1816), German classical philologist
- Frieda Wunderlich (1884–1965), German female economist and politician (DDP, DStP)
- Friedrich Wunderlich (1891–1977), Fregattenkapitän with the Kriegsmarine during World War II
- Fritz Wunderlich (1930–1966), German tenor singer
- Georg Wunderlich (1893–1963), German footballer
- Hans Wunderlich (1899–1977), German journalist and politician (SPD), MdPR
- Hans Georg Wunderlich (1928–1974), German geologist
- Janis Mars Wunderlich, American ceramic artist
- Jerry Wunderlich (1925–1999), American set decorator
- Johann Georg Wunderlich (1755–1819), German composer and flautist
- Jörn Wunderlich (born 1960), a German politician (Die Linke), MdB
- Klaus Wunderlich (1931–1997), German art musician
- Magdalena Wunderlich (born 1952), West German slalom canoer
- Mark Wunderlich (born 1968), American poet
- Mike Wunderlich (born 1986), German footballer
- Otto Wunderlich (1886–1975), German photographer of Spain
- Paul Wunderlich (1927–2010), German painter
- Pia Wunderlich (born 1975), German female footballer
- Thomas Wunderlich (born 1955), Austrian geodesist
- Tina Wunderlich (born 1977), German female football player

== See also ==
- United States v. Wunderlich, 342 U.S. 98 (1951) was a case decided before the United States Supreme Court
- Wunderlich syndrome, spontaneous, nontraumatic renal hemorrhage
- Wunderlich Verlag, an imprint of the German publishing house Rowohlt Verlag
