= Friedrich Ernst Ruhkopf =

German philologist and educator (1760–1821)

Friedrich Ernst Ruhkopf (Latin: Fridericus Ernestus Ruhkopf; 1 October 1760 – 1821) was a German philologist and educator born in Soßmar, a village near Hildesheim.

Ruhkopf was a schoolteacher in Ruppin, and in 1794 was appointed rector at Bielefeld. From 1815 to 1821, he was director of the Lyceum in Hanover. He is remembered for his work in classical philology, in particular, his five-volume edition of Seneca, titled "L. Annaei Senecae philosophi Opera omnia quae supersunt" (1797-1811).

== Published works ==
- Erklärende Anmerkungen zu Homers Ilias, (Explanatory notes on Homer's Iliad), with Johann Heinrich Justus Köppen.
- Geschichte des Schul- und Erziehungswesens in Deutschland, (History of the school and education system in Germany), (1794).
- L. Annaei Senecae Philosophi Opera omnia quae supersunt; (5 volumes, 1797–1811).
- P. Virgilii Maronis opera in tironum gratiam perpetua, edition of Virgil, with Christian Gottlob Heyne and Ernst Karl Friedrich Wunderlich (2 volumes, 1816).
- Über Homers Leben und Gesänge, (On Homer's life and songs), with Johann Heinrich Justus Köppen, (1821).
- Lateinisch-deutsches und deutsch-lateinisches Schulwörterbuch, (Latin-German and German-Latin dictionary), with Ernst Friedrich Kärcher; (1822).
