= Allgemeines Deutsches Handelsgesetzbuch =

ADHGB
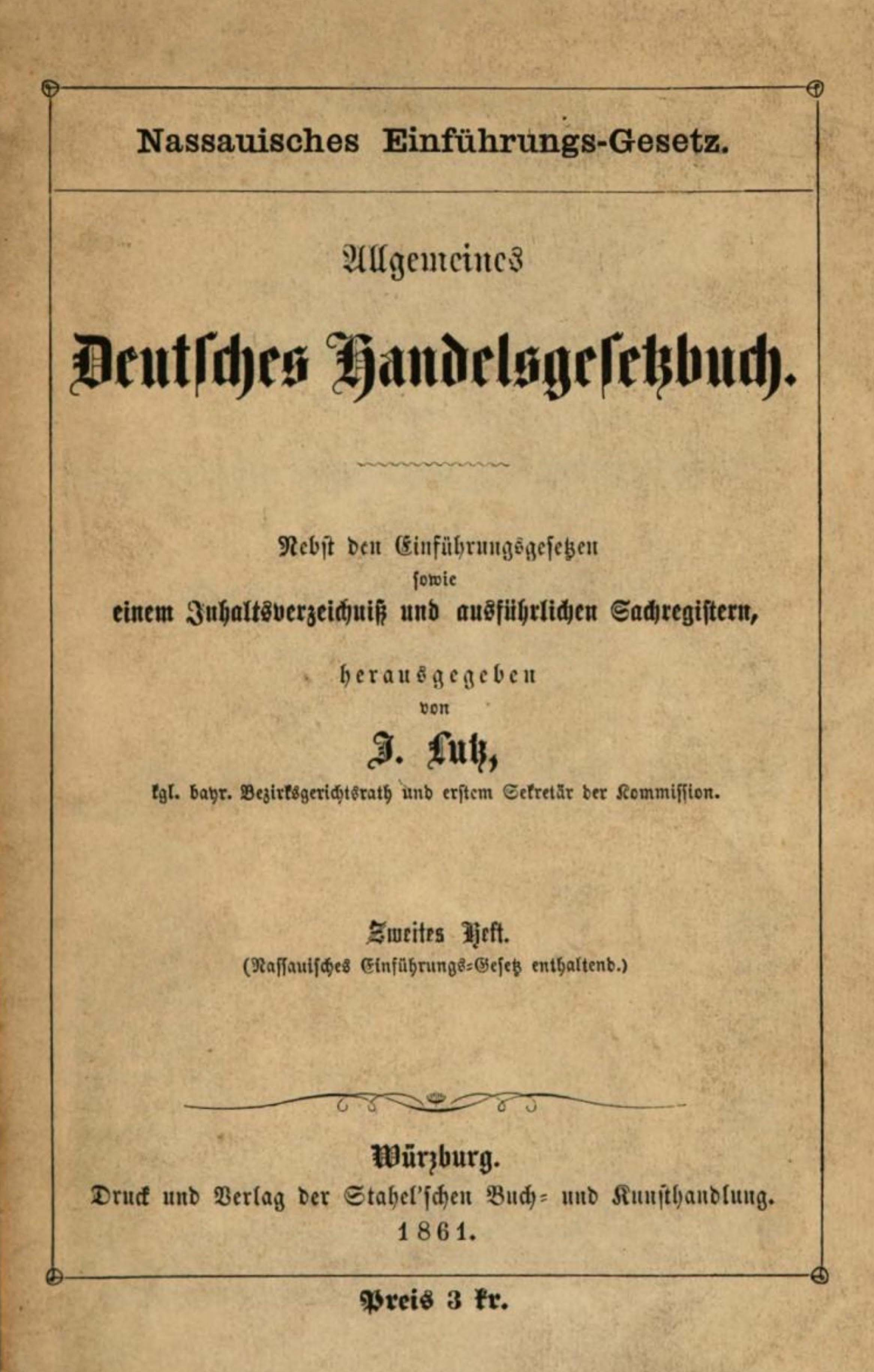

Federal Convention
- Long title: Allgemeines Deutsches Handelsgesetzbuch
- Citation: Law text (1869)
- Territorial extent: German Confederation(1861-1866); North German Confederation(1869-1871); German Empire (1871-1900); Austria (1863-1938); Liechtenstein (since 1865)
- Passed: 31 May 1861
- Repealed: Germany (1 January 1900); Austria (gradually as from 1938)

Summary
- Commercial Law
- Status: Repealed

The Allgemeines Deutsches Handelsgesetzbuch (ADHGB; English: General German Commercial Code (GGCC)) was the first comprehensive commercial code in Germany. The term "Allgemein" (General) emphasized the whole German Confederation as the scope of application.

== History ==
=== Legal initial situation ===
Until introduction of ADHGB German commercial law reflected the political splintering of Germany.

==== Preußisches Allgemeines Landrecht ====
The Preußisches Allgemeines Landrecht (ALR) of 1794 (English Prussian General Land Law) applied to Prussian state territory. Legal provisions for burgher classes („Bürgerstände“) could be found in Eighth Title (Achter Titel). This comprised rules for craftsmen (Handwerker) (§§ 179 to 400) in addition to these for artists and fabricants (Künstler und Fabrikanten) (§§ 401 to 423) and for merchants (§§ 475 to 712). Here §§ 475 bis 496 ALR defined characteristics of a merchant. §§ 497 bis 545 ALR affected factors and dispatchers (Faktoren und Disponenten) whereby procuration (Prokura), a special power of attorney, could be found in §§ 498 et seq. ALR.

§§ 546 to 553 ALR dealt with merchant assistant and apprentices (Handlungsdienern und Lehrlingen), §§ 562 to 613 ALR with trading books (Handelsbücher) and §§ 614 to 683 ALR with companies (Handlungsgesellschaften). Mecantile interests (Kaufmännische Zinsen) werde regulated by §§ 684 to 697 ALR, brokerages (Provisionen) by §§ 698 to 701 ALR and merchant recommendations (Kaufmännische Empfehlungen) by §§ 702 ti 712 ALR.

==== Code de commerce ====
In areas west of the Rhine and in Baden (as an annex to Badisches Landrecht (engl. Baden Land Law) of 1810) French Code de commerce of 1808 ruled.

==== Particular law und Common law ====
Apart from that Particular law (Patrikularrecht) or subsidiary Common law, here ius commune (Gemeines Recht), were applied.

=== Draft of 1849 ===
Preliminary works for ADHGB can be traced back to 1848/49. Already Paulskirche Constitution of 28 March 1849 provided in § 64 inter alia establishing a General Commercial Code. On 2 December 1848 a commission had started preparations previously.

In March 1849 finally the „Entwurf eines allgemeinen Handelsgesetzbuches für Deutschland“ (Draft of a general commercial code for Germany) was presented. After the Prussian King Friedrich Wilhelm IV had rejected the imperial crown, that he was offered on 4 April 1849, the constitutional project miscarried. In the same year Commission dissolved.

=== The ADHGB ===
==== Nuremberg HGB-Commission ====
On a proposal from the Kingdom of Bavaria the Federal Convention (Bundesversammlung also Bundestag) of the German Confederation establish a commission, that should elaborate a commercial code. That was 21 February 1856. King Maximilian II Joseph of Bavaria is said to have motivated the project in person. The Prussian deputy for the Federal Convention Otto von Bismarck thereby voted not against the application against, what contravene with the instruction form the Prussian Prime Minister Otto Theodor von Manteuffel. Also on the suggestion of Bismarck not Frankfurt am Main, Federal Assembly's official seat, but the ancient trading town Nuremberg was chosen as conference venue. So the working group should go down in history as Nuremberg HGB-Commission (Nürnberger HGB-Kommission).

The commission presided by the Bavarian Ministry of Justice Friedrich von Ringelmann was in session as of January 1857. Also numerous merchants belonged to the commission. German mercantile community and jurists thereby pronounced against Code de commerce as a model for ADHGB, because it was pre-industrial characterized and thus been overtaken by circumstances. Instead a Prussian draft war favoured as a working basis.

==== Resolution on ADHGB ====
On 31 May 1861 this "Nuremberg Draft" („Nürnberger Entwurf“) of an Allgemeines Deutsches Handelsgesetzbuch (ADHGB) was recommended to be introduced in the individual states by the General Assembly of the German Confederation. As of 1861 ADHGB applied in German Confederation´s member states as identical right. Some federal states, like the Free City of Hamburg, even declared ADHGB applicable for legal transactions (Rechtsgeschäfte) without merchant participation.

=== Development after 1866 ===
German Confederation was dissolved in Augsburg on 23 August 1866. ADHGB persisted in the former federal states.

==== Germany ====
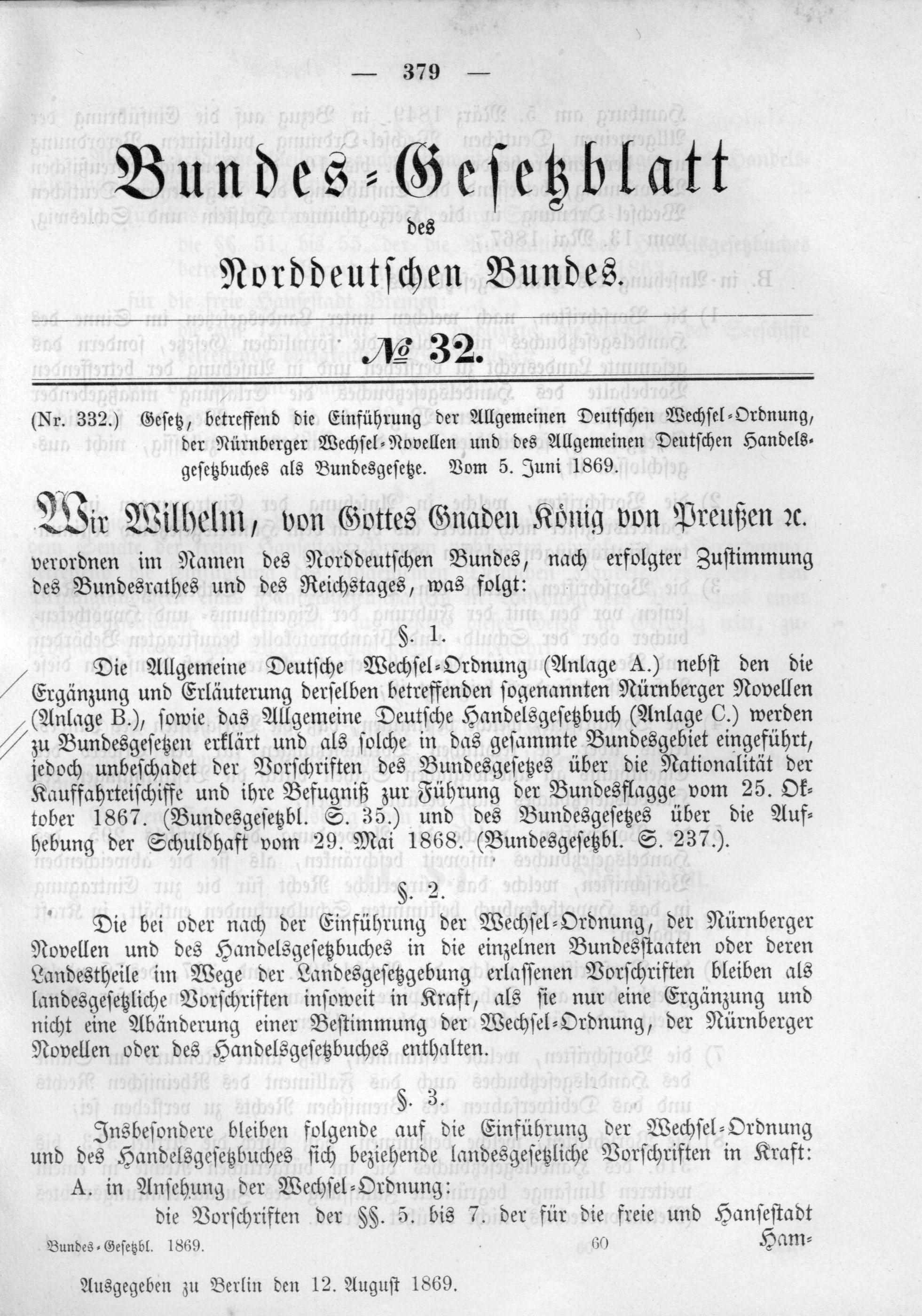
Announcement for the North German Confederation (1869)

North German Confederation took over ADHGB by federal act (Bundesgesetz) on 5 June 1869. ADHGB remained in force in German Empire in accordance with Imperial Act (Reichsgesetz) of 16 April 1871. Supreme court for the interpretation of ADHGB was Reichsoberhandelsgericht (ROHG, English Imperial Higher Commercial Court, until 1871 Bundesoberhandelsgericht, English Federal Higher Commercial Court), that later was merged in Reichsgericht (english Imperial Court of Justice). ADHGB was replaced in German Empire by the Handelsgesetzbuch (HGB, English Commercial Code), that was legislated on 10 May 1897. The HGB came into force together with the Bürgerliches Gesetzbuch (BGB) on 1 January 1900.

==== Austria ====
The ADHGB was introduced as Allgemeines Handelsgesetzbuch (AHGB) (English: General Commercial Code) in the Empire of Austria on 1863 (Österreichisches Reichsgesetzblatt 1/1863). After establishment of the Republic of Austria it was applied until the annexation to the German Realm on 13 Märch 1938. Then it was gradually replaced by the Handelsgesetzbuch (HGB).

==== Liechtenstein ====
The Allgemeines Deutsches Handelsgesetzbuch (ADHGB) was assumed by the Principality of Liechtenstein by the act of 16 Septembre 1865. To the present day its binding law. Large parts however were replaced by the Personen- und Gesellschaftsrecht (PGR, English Personal and Corporation Law) on 19 February 1926. The ADHGB has still practical significance for the sectors procurators (Prokuristen), authorized representative (Handlungsbevollmächtigte), commercial brokers (Handelsmäkler) and trading activities (Handelsgeschäfte).

== Content ==
With its basic concept ADHGB pursues preponderantly an objektive system represented by Levin Goldschmidt, that defines merchant (Kaufmann) objektive by means of legally standardized trading activities (Handelsgeschäfte). Orientation on professional conduct according to Johann Heinrich Thöl was clearly rejected.

== Reception ==
=== Germany ===
In the absence of a "Allgemeines Deutsches Bürgerliches Gesetzbuch" (english General German Civil Code) ADHGB included also general rules for representation (Stellvertretung) (Art. 52-56 ADHGB), fulfilling (Erfüllung) (Art. 324-336 ADHGB) and purchase agreement (Kaufvertrag) (Art. 337-359 ADHGB), that should be "a landmark template" („richtungweisende Vorlage“) for future Bürgerliches Gesetzbuch (BGB).

=== Japan ===
The German jurist Hermann Rösler authored a draft of a commercial code for Japan in 1884, that was influenced by the ADHGB.

=== Turkey ===
Turkish law also was shaped by the ADHGB.

== Evaluations and comments ==
For Levin Goldschmidt ADHGB was "the most thoroughly and best of existing European Commercial Codes" („gründlichste und beste unter den vorhandenen Europäischen Handelsgesetzbüchern“).

== Bibliography ==
General

- Johannes W. Flume: Law and Commerce – The Evolution of Codified Business Law in Europe, in: Comparative Legal History (CLH) 2 (2014), p. 46-84.
- Mathias Reimann, Joachim Zekoll: Introduction to German Law, The Hague 2005, p. 126 seq.
- (German) Allgemeines Deutsches Handelsgesetzbuch. Law text (1869).
- (German) Christoph Bergfeld: Preußen und das Allgemeine Deutsche Handelsgesetzbuch, in: Ius Commune, Bd. XIV (1987), p. 101–114.
- (German) Gero Fuchs: Die politische Bedeutung des Allgemeinen Deutschen Handelsgesetzbuchs im 19. Jahrhundert, in: Bonner Rechtsjournal (BRJ) 2013, 13.

Special aspects

- (German) Diethard Bühler: Die Entstehung der allgemeinen Vertragsschluss-Vorschriften im Allgemeinen Deutschen Handelsgesetzbuch (ADHGB) von 1861. ein Beitrag zur Kodifikationsgeschichte des Privatrechts im 19. Jahrhundert, Frankfurt am Main1999.
- (German) Karsten Engler: Die Kommanditgesellschaft (KG) und die stille Gesellschaft im Allgemeinen Deutschen Handelsgesetzbuch (ADHGB) von 1861, Frankfurt am Main 1999.
- (German) Ralf Heimann: Die Entwicklung der handelsrechtlichen Veröffentlichung vom ALR bis zum ADHGB, Berlin 2008.
- (German) Jörg Hofmeister: Die Entwicklung des Gesellschafterwechsels im Recht der Personengesellschaften vom ALR bis zum ADHGB, Berlin 2002.
- (German) Friedrich Benedict Heyn: Die Entwicklung des Eisenbahnfrachtrechts von den Anfängen bis zur Einführung des Allgemeinen Deutschen Handelsgesetzbuches (ADHGB), Frankfurt am Main 1996.
- (German) Albert Schnelle: Bremen und die Entstehung des allgemeinen deutschen Handelsgesetzbuches: 1856 - 1864, Bremen 1992.
- (German) Rüdiger Servos: Die Personenhandelsgesellschaften und die stille Gesellschaft in den Kodifikationen und Kodifikationsentwürfen vom ALR bis zum ADHGB, Köln 1984.
- (German) Daniel Spindler: Zeitwertbilanzierung nach dem ADHGB von 1861 und nach den IAS-IFRS. eine empirische Analyse aus Kapitalgebersicht, Sternenfeld 2005.
