= Georg Arnold Heise =

German legal scholar (1778–1851)

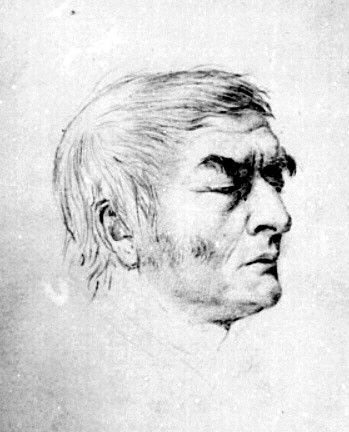
- Portrait of Heise by Carl Julius Milde

1st President of the Oberappellationsgericht der vier Freien Städte
- In office 13 November 1820 – 1850
- Succeeded by: Karl Georg von Wächter

Personal details
- Born: 2 August 1778 Free City of Hamburg, Holy Roman Empire
- Died: 6 February 1851 (aged 72) Free City of Lübeck, German Confederation
- Spouse: Sophia Georgina Elisabeth "Betty" Isenbart (? – 1831)
- Children: Sophie Therese Heise (1805–1805); Karl Ernst Friedrich Heise (1808–1808); Johanna Ernestine Heise/Hach (1811–1889); Emma Heise/von Bippen (1814–1905)
- Occupation: Law professor Author; Judge and Court President

Georg Arnold Heise (2 August 1778 – 6 February 1851) was an influential German legal scholar. He served as president of the (Lübeck based) Oberappellationsgericht der vier Freien Städte (High Court of Appeal of the Four Free Cities) for more than three decades and is identified in certain academic circles as a leading representative of the 19th century German Historical School of Jurisprudence.

== Life ==
Georg Arnold Heise was born in Hamburg. He was the eldest of his parents' nine recorded children: after his mother died in 1801 his father remarried and a further three children appeared. His father; Johann Ludwig Barthold Heise (1749–1812), was a Hamburg merchant who lost his wealth thanks to the ruinous economic impact of the world war (as it was frequently known at the time). The father had to abandon his business in 1799 and take employment as a legally authorized agent ("Bevollmächtigter") with an asset management company. Heise's mother, born Maria Anna Behrmann, came from a major Hamburg mercantile family.

Initially Heise was schooled at home, alongside his younger brothers. An early tutor was Paul Lorenz Cropp, a Lutheran pastor and the father of Friedrich Cropp who subsequently became Heise's colleague and a personal friend. Later he attended the commercially oriented secondary school run by Johann Georg Büsch, concluding his schooling at a Hamburg Gymnasium (secondary school). Sources suggest that early on he aspired to a career as an engineer, but because of his diminutive stature this was felt to be impractical. Instead, encouraged by his uncle, the Hamburg Senator (and later city mayor) Arnold Heise, he decided to study Jurisprudence (as his uncle had done) at university. In 1798 he enrolled at the University of Jena where he became part of a network of students who would continue as friends throughout their – in several instances notable – careers. A couple of years after this he transferred to Göttingen which is where, early in 1802, he received his doctorate for a dissertation on laws governing inheritance, entitled "de successoribus necessariis".

Directly after receiving his doctorate, in March 1802 he took teaching work at Göttingen's "Spruchcollegium" where, starting after Easter 1803, he worked as a lecturer on contract and civil law. As matters turned out he did not stay at Göttingen for long. The lecture topics were chosen more as a result of academic necessity than as any reflection of his own particular inclinations, but his lectures were nevertheless well received, so that early in 1804 he found himself with a professorship at Jena. In the summer of the same year, through the intervention of Friedrich Carl von Savigny, one of his university friends, Heise received and accepted an invitation to become a visiting professor in church law at Heidelberg University in the summer of 1804.

During the ten years that he now spent at Heidelberg, Heise established for himself a reputation for academic brilliance, both through his teaching and through specialist articles and other written work. He also played a central role in building up the law department at the university in the face of widespread economic challenges resulting from the war. Directly before settling in Heidelberg, however, he married Sophia Georgina Elisabeth "Betty" Isenbart, the daughter of a colonel from Hanover whom he had met in the house of his friend Christoph Martin.

In 1814 he returned from Heidelberg to Göttingen, taking a post as Professor of Roman Law. He enjoyed great success as a teacher of Pandectic and Commercial law. At the same time, following moves towards standardisation of laws under Napoleon, the future of the legal underpinnings and structures were subjects of intense and at times polarised discussion, reflecting the rapid political, economic and social changes of the period: Heise's published contributions were increasingly acknowledged by supporters and opponents alike in academic and legal circles.

Nevertheless, he stayed at Göttingen only for four years before moving again, towards the end of 1818, this time to his wife's home city of Hanover. He now gave up teaching and embarked on a new career in public service, taking a job as a senior advocate ("Vortragender Rat") in the regional justice department. Göttingen University had recently been granted the right to nominate member of parliament. In 1819 Heise was nominated by the university as a member of the lower chamber of the parliament/legislative assembly of the kingdom. However, he had already let it be known that were the opportunity to arise he would welcome the chance to move back to his own home city, Hamburg, where following the ending of the French occupation, restructuring of the political and legal systems was also very much on the agenda.

Article 12 (Section 3) of the 1815 constitution had provided for the right of the "four free cities to establish a joint high court". The "free cities" in question were Bremen, Frankfurt am Main, Hamburg and Lübeck. After a certain amount of jostling between the politicians involved, the Oberappellationsgericht der vier Freien Städte (High Court of Appeal of the four Free Cities) was established in Lübeck in 1820. With effect from its inauguration on 12 November 1820, Georg Arnold Heise accepted the invitation to become the court's first president. The court endured for nearly sixty years, replaced only in 1879 under the provisions of the State Justice Laws of 1877, enacted in the aftermath of unification. Heise was in charge of it for slightly more than half of the period covered by its existence. Under his leadership its reputation grew within and beyond the "four free cities", as it was appointed to arbitrate in cases involving intergovernmental disputes between other component states of the German Confederation.

== Significance ==
The distinguished jurist Bernhard Windscheid wrote later than for an ambitious [German] jurist of Heise's generation there were really only two jobs to covet. One was to succeed Savigny, who was central to the establishment of a modern legal system in Prussia, and the other, in Windscheid's opinion, would be to take on Heise's job. Many of the court decisions under Heise's presidency developed commercial law decisively, and in some cases achieved lasting influence as precedents. Heise's influence as an academic lawyer reached far beyond his own students thanks, in large measure, to the influence of his written work. This is particularly the case with his much re-printed Pandectist lectures.

== Published works ==
- Heise, Georg Arnold (1807). Grundriss eines Systems des Gemeinen Civilrechts zum Behuf von Pandecten-Vorlesungen (in German). Heidelberg: Mohr und Zimmer.
  - Heise, Georg Arnold (1819). Grundriss eines Systems des Gemeinen Civilrechts zum Behuf von Pandecten-Vorlesungen (in German) (3 ed.). Heidelberg: Mohr und Zimmer.
  - Several further reprints, most recently in 1997, ISBN 3-8051-0302-6.
- Heise, Georg Arnold; Cropp, Friedrich (1827). Juristische Abhandlungen mit Entscheidungen des Oberappellationsgerichts der vier freien Städte Deutschlands (in German). Vol. I. Hamburg: Friedrich Perthes.
- Heise, Georg Arnold; Cropp, Friedrich (1830). Juristische Abhandlungen mit Entscheidungen des Oberappellationsgerichts der vier freien Städte Deutschlands (in German). Vol. II. Hamburg: Friedrich Perthes.
- Heise, Georg Arnold (1858). Wunderlich, Agathon (ed.). Heise's Handelsrecht, nach dem Original-Manuscript (in German). Frankfurt am Main: Sauerländer's Verlag.
