= Sustainable Performance Accounting =

Business management concept

Sustainable Performance Accounting is a business management concept designed to integrate sustainability into the corporate internal and external income statement (P&L). It incorporates sustainability matters into established performance indicators derived from the income statement, such as net income, EBIT (earnings before interest and taxes), or ROE (return on equity).

== Definition ==
Sustainable Performance Accounting (SPA) builds on established principles of business administration, particularly bookkeeping. To link financial and sustainability-related information, it introduces a second bookkeeping system alongside financial bookkeeping (F-bookkeeping). ESG bookkeeping follows established accounting principles and covers environmental (E), social (S) and governance (G) matters. Together, financial and ESG bookkeeping form an integrated sustainable bookkeeping system (S-bookkeeping), which is intended to record negative and positive external ESG effects in the balance sheet and income statement.

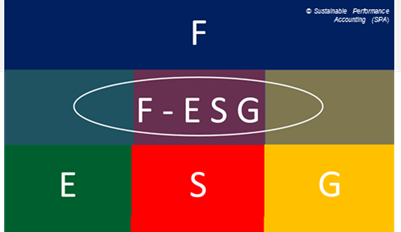
Symbol for integrated reporting of financial (F) and sustainability (ESG) information

SPA distinguishes between financial risk and opportunities ESG matters (financial materiality, outside-in perspective) and ESG matters relating to the common good (impact materiality, inside-out perspective). These categories correspond to the double materiality assessment (DMA) used in the European Sustainability Reporting Standards (ESRS). Within the SPA framework, this alignment is presented as a way to ensure compatibility with ESRS terminology.

SPA describes the "general public" (common good) as consisting of natural and social systems that interact with companies, and incorporates these relationships through the new SPA equity item "ESG capital". In this model, ESG common good aspects are recorded against this position, which the authors conceptualise as an implicit non-controlling stakeholder interest. Based on S-bookkeeping, sustainability-related performance indicators (S-performance indicators) can be derived from information reported under frameworks such as the ESRS. For example, EBIT is extended to SEBIT (sustainable EBIT). Within the SPA framework, corporate performance is regarded as sustainable when financial viability and relevant ESG matters are jointly reflected in these indicators.

== History and background ==
The first publications on the subject of a more sustainable bookkeeping date back to the 2000s. In 2023, the concept of Sustainable Performance Accounting was first presented to larger audiences, developed among others by Knut Henkel, Jenny Lay-Kumar, and Christian Hiß. The concept is intended in particular to help larger companies to integrate their sustainability matters (e.g. their CO_{2}-emissions) into their P&L-related KPIs (e.g. net income, EBIT, ROE). In a political context, corporate requirements in the European Union regarding sustainability have increased within the framework of the European Green Deal and related regulatory initiatives, including the CSRD.

ESG issues are playing an increasingly prominent role in the operational income statement. These sustainability-related issues are increasingly regarded as pre-financials, which can have both a financial materiality as well as an impact materiality. From the 2024 financial year onwards, the first EU companies have to prepare a sustainability report in accordance with the Corporate Sustainability Reporting Directive (CSRD) in conjunction with the EU Taxonomy Regulation (EU TaxR).

According to Henkel, Lay-Kumar and Hiß, sustainability issues can only be incorporated into earnings and profitability indicators if they are recorded in bookkeeping. The authors argue that this is generally not possible under current International Financial Reporting Standards (IFRS) and German Commercial Code (HGB) rules, because the recognition criteria for assets and provisions are usually not met for the ESG matters discussed. They note that, in most cases, no probable inflow or outflow of economic resources can be demonstrated for such items, which prevents their recognition in financial statements. As a result, the authors conclude that sustainable business practices usually are not reflected in conventional key performance indicators, leading to a disadvantage from a holistic accounting perspective.

Proponents of SPA argue that the long-term goal of SPA must be that parallel F and ESG bookkeeping is no longer required because all ESG issues are subject to regular F-bookkeeping and F-accounting. The more ESG matters are regulated or the recognition criteria for F-accounting are expanded, their integration into standard accounting practices may become more feasible. A prerequisite for such regulatory approaches, including potential ESG-related taxation or transfer mechanisms, is the availability of priced ESG indicators, as demonstrated for numerous agricultural and forestry indicators in the German Regionalwert performance calculations.

However, many sustainability issues lack generally accepted measurement methods, as standardised indicators, thresholds and monetisation approaches are still under development as of 2025. It has been argued that it would be preferable to use imperfect standards for the internalisation of external effects in ESG bookkeeping than not to carry out any measurement and bookkeeping entry at all.

=== ESG capital ===
SPA uses the introduction of ESG capital to show the demands of the general public on companies and vice versa. This item is in turn subdivided into the three ESG capital sub-items; Environmental (E), Social (S) and Governance (G). ESG capital is based on the idea that other stakeholders or entities may be entitled to equity. The European Sustainability Standards explicitly refer to nature as a silent stakeholder. This logic can in turn be transferred to ecosystems or ecological entities, e.g. rivers, as the allocation of personal rights to the Ganges River, among others, shows.

When an asset is derecognised in exchange for ESG capital, the SPA framework interprets this as the company providing sustainability-related services to the public. From an accounting perspective, this is recorded as a debit entry in the ESG account and is viewed positively within the analysis. Conversely, derecognising a provision against ESG capital indicates that ESG-related costs have been borne by the public, for example in the case of CO₂ emissions (ESRS E1). This is recorded as a credit entry in the ESG capital account and is considered negative within the framework. It has been suggested that credit or debit balances in ESG capital could serve as a basis for ESG-related taxation or transfer mechanisms, whereby negative impacts (debit ESG capital amount) would lead to payments and positive impacts (credit amount) could result in financial compensation.

== Example ==
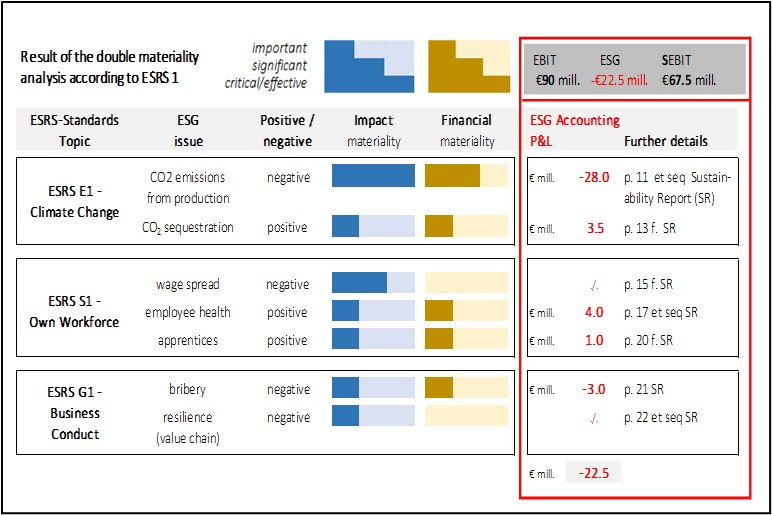
Figure: Reconciliation from EBIT to SEBIT

The SPA framework has been illustrated in the literature through a numerical example in which the results of a double materiality assessment are translated into ESG-related accounting entries. In the example by Henkel, Lay-Kumar and Hiß (2024), selected environmental, social and governance topics are assigned positive or negative values depending on their measured impacts and are recorded in an ESG income statement. These adjustments are then reconciled with conventional EBIT to derive SEBIT (sustainable EBIT), illustrating how SPA incorporates quantified ESG effects into performance measurement.

== Literature ==
- Geschwindner, Sven; Eser, Toni; Haubold, Stephan (2023): DATA – a sustainable performance accounting framework for SMEs. From macro planetary boundaries to micro economic Sustainable Earnings Before Interest and Tax – SEBIT. In: Journal of Business Chemistry, June 2023, pp. 112–122.
- Henkel, Knut; Lay-Kumar, Jenny; Hiß, Christian (2024): From EBIT to SEBIT (Sustainable EBIT): Sustainable Performance Accounting (SPA) using the Example of CO2 Accounting. In: Journal of Modern Accounting and Auditing (JMAA), Apr.-June 2024, Vol. 20, No. 2, pp. 49–71.
- Henkel, Knut; Lay-Kumar, Jenny; Hiß, Christian (2023): Sustainable Performance Accounting (SPA) am Beispiel der Bilanzierung von CO2-Emissionen. OPUS Hochschulschrift der Hochschule Emden/Leer.
- Hiß, Christian (2015): Richtig rechnen! Durch die Reform der Finanzbuchhaltung zur ökologisch-ökonomischen Wende. Oekom, Munich.
- Lay-Kumar, J.; Walkiewicz, J.; Hiß, C.; Heck, A. (2023): Sustainable Performance Accounting als Schlüssel für die Nachhaltigkeitstransformation – Einsichten aus dem Projekt QuartaVista. In: Zwick, Y., Jeromin, K. (eds): Mit Sustainable Finance die Transformation dynamisieren. Springer Gabler, Wiesbaden.
- Walkiewicz, Juliana; Lay-Kumar, Jenny; Herzig, Christian (2021): The integration of sustainability and externalities into the "corporate DNA": a practice-oriented approach. In: Corporate Governance, Vol. 21, No. 3, pp. 479–496.
