= Levin Goldschmidt =

German jurist (1829–1897)

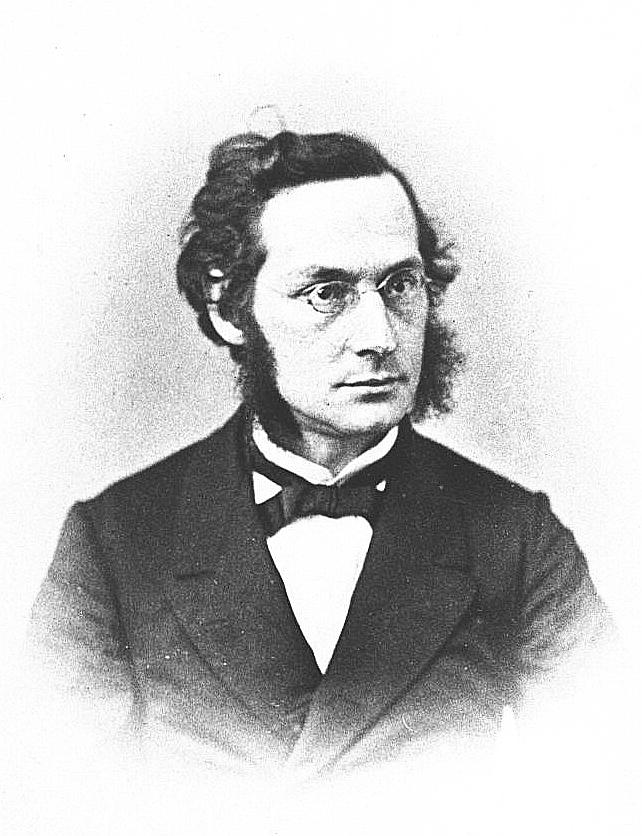
- Born: 30 May 1829; Danzig, Prussia
- Died: 16 July 1897 (aged 68); Bad Wilhelmshöhe, Hesse-Nassau, Prussia
- Occupation: Jurist

Education
- Education: University of Berlin; University of Bonn; University of Heidelberg; University of Halle

Philosophical work
- Notable students: Max Weber

Levin Goldschmidt (30 May 1829 – 16 July 1897) was a German jurist, judge and academic. He was a Judge at the Reichsoberhandelsgericht and a professor at the University of Berlin. Between 1875 and 1877 he also served as a member of the German Parliament.

== Life ==
Levin Goldschmidt was born into a German Jewish family in the Prussian city of Danzig in 1829. His parents were David Goldschmidt, a merchant, and Henriette Laser. From 1847 to 1851, Goldschmidt pursued studies at the universities of Berlin, Bonn, and Heidelberg, receiving his doctor's degree in 1851 from the University of Halle. He practised for several years in the courts of Danzig, became privatdozent at the University of Heidelberg in 1855, and was appointed associate professor in 1860. Between 1857 to 1860, he published Kritik des Entwurfs eines Handelsgesetzbuchs für die Preussischen Staaten and Gutachten über den Entwurf eines Deutschen Handelsgesetzbuchs nach den Beschlüssen Zweiter Lesung, which at once attracted attention to him as a critical jurist. During the same period, he published Der Lucca-Pistoja-Aktienstreit, Frankfurt, 1859 (Supplement, 1861). He was the founder (1858) of the Zeitschrift für das Gesamte Handelsrecht.

Goldschmidt's scholarship was next displayed in his Encyclopädie der Rechtswissenschaft im Grundriss, Heidelberg, 1862. He then began the great work which occupied him during the remainder of his life, but which he did not live to complete, namely, Das Handbuch des Handelsrechts, Erlangen, 1864–68. This is the work with which his fame as a historical jurist is identified, it being recognized as a masterly presentation of the general history of commercial law.

In 1866, Goldschmidt was promoted to a professorship in the law faculty at Heidelberg. He next received the appointment of Justizrat in the Bundesgericht at Leipzig, afterward occupying a judicial position at the Reichsoberhandelsgericht. In 1875, he became professor of commercial law in Berlin University, and received the title Geheimer Justizrat. From 1875 to 1877, he was also a member of the German Reichstag, representing the city of Leipzig.

In the late 1880s, Goldschmidt was the doctoral adviser to Max Weber, who was awarded his doctoral degree in 1889 for his dissertation "Die Entwickelung des Solidarhaftprinzips und des Sondervermögens der offenen Handelsgesellschaft aus den Haushalts- und Gewerbegemeinschaften in den italienischen Städten". The expanded dissertation was published by Weber as Zur Geschichte der Handelsgesellschaften im Mittelalter.

Of Goldschmidt's further publications the following deserve special mention: Das Dreijährige Studium der Rechts- und Staatswissenschaften, Berlin, 1878; Erwerbs- und Wirtschaftsgenossenschaften, Studien und Vorschläge, Stuttgart, 1882; Rechtsstudium und Prüfungsordnung, ib. 1887; Die Haftpflicht der Genossen und das Umlageverfahren, Berlin, 1888; System des Handelsrechts, Stuttgart, 1887, 4th ed., 1891.

He died in Bad Wilhelmshöhe, now a neighborhood of Kassel and was buried in the Schönhauser Allee Jewish Cemetery in Berlin.

== Bibliography ==
- Adler, K. (1898). "Goldschmidt, Levin". Biographisches Jahrbuch und Deutscher Nekrolog (in German). 2: 119–122. hdl:2027/hvd.hx3jum.
- Laband, Paul (1897). "Levin Goldschmidt. †". Deutsche Juristen-Zeitung (in German). 2: 296–298.
- Pappenheim, Max (1898). "Levin Goldschmidt". Zeitschrift für Handelsrecht (in German). 47: 1–49. hdl:2027/mdp.35112102937929.
- Pappenheim, Max (1904). "Goldschmidt, Levin" . Allgemeine Deutsche Biographie (in German). Vol. 49. Leipzig: Duncker & Humblot. pp. 438–448.
- Riesser, Jacob (1897). L. Goldschmidt. Gedächtnisrede, gehalten in der Juristischen Gesellschaft zu Berlin am 13. November 1897 (in German). Berlin: Otto Liebmann.
