= Johann Heinrich Justus Köppen =

German philologist (1755–1791)

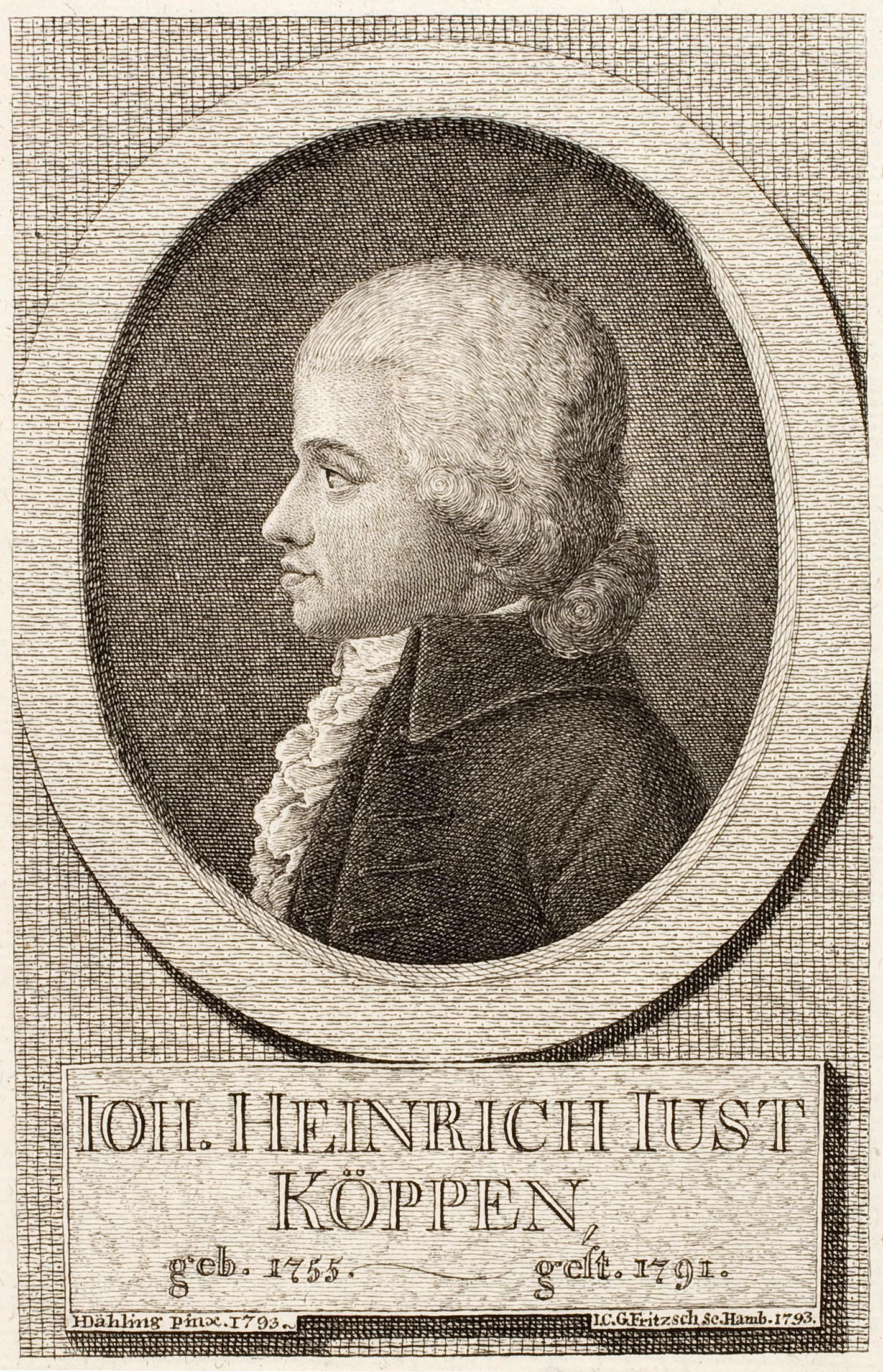
„IOH. HEINRICH IUST KÖPPEN“, copper engraving by Johann Christian Gottfried Fritzsch after Heinrich Anton Dähling; 1793

Johann Heinrich Justus Köppen (15 November 1755 – 9 November 1791) was a German philologist and pedagogue born in Hanover.

He studied philology at the University of Göttingen, where he was a pupil of Christian Gottlob Heyne (1729-1812). From 1779 he served as an adjunct instructor at the Pädagogium in Ilfeld, afterwards becoming director of the gymnasium at Hildesheim in 1783. In September 1791 he began teaching classes at the Lyceum in Hanover, but soon succumbed to illness and died in early November at the age of 35.

Köppen was the author of "Erklärende Anmerkungen zu Homers Ilias" (Explanatory notes on Homer's Iliad) and "Über Homers Leben und Gesänge" (Homer's life and songs). After his death both works were edited and augmented by Friedrich Ernst Ruhkopf (1760-1821).
