= Oberappellationsgericht der vier Freien Städte =

Former German appeals court (1820–1879)

High Court of Appeal of the Four Free Cities
- Oberappellationsgericht der vier Freien Städte (German)
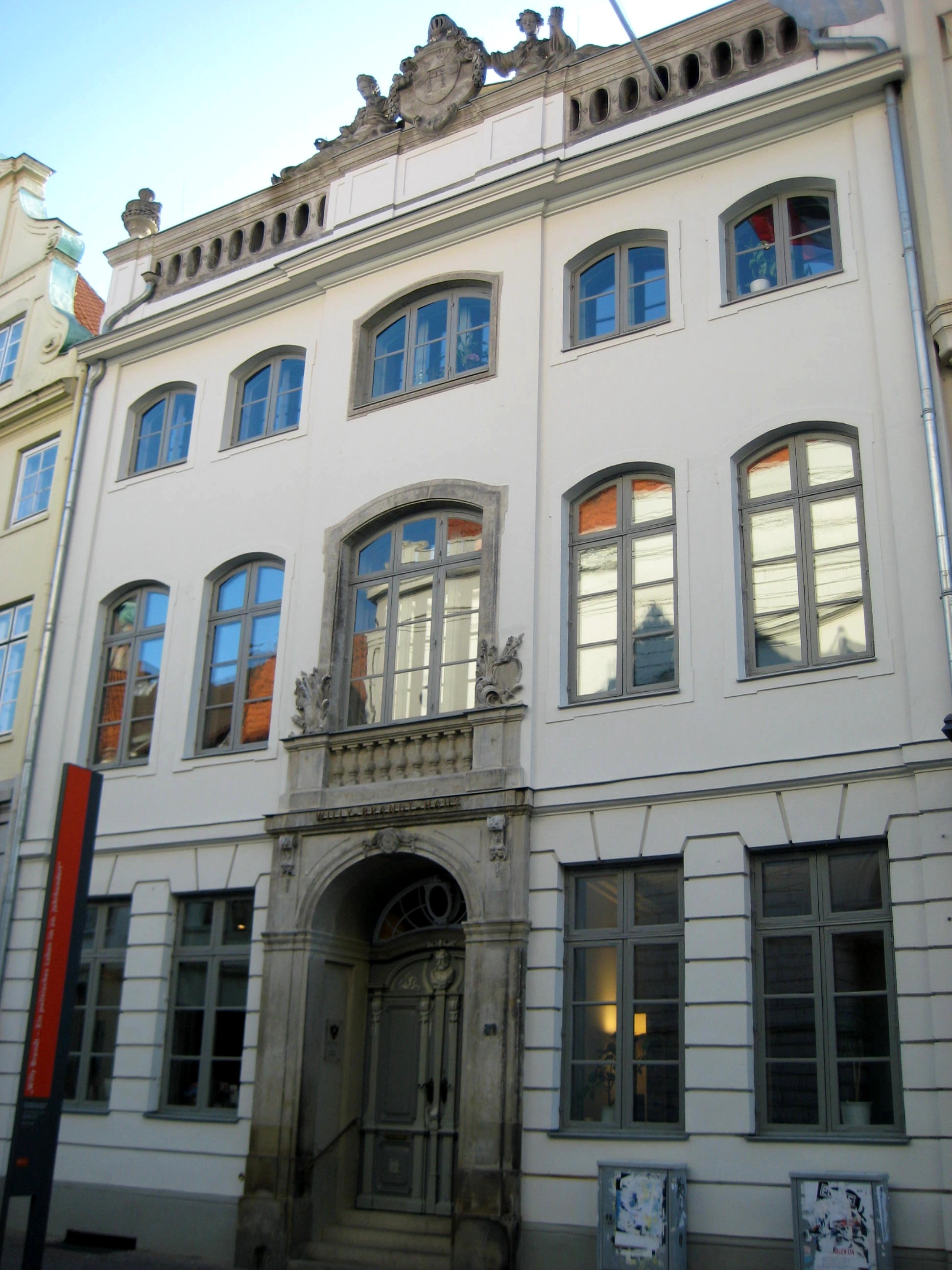
- The Willy Brandt House, Lübeck, which formerly housed the court
- Interactive map of High Court of Appeal of the Four Free Cities
- 53°52′11″N 10°41′22″E
- Established: 1820
- Dissolved: 30 September 1879
- Jurisdiction: Bremen (1820–1879); Lübeck (1820–1879); Hamburg (1820–1879); Frankfurt (1820–1867)
- Location: Lübeck, German Confederation
- Coordinates: 53°52′11″N 10°41′22″E
- Language: German

The Oberappellationsgericht der vier Freien Städte (English: Court of Appeal of the Four Free Cities), since 1867 the Oberappellationsgericht der Freien Hansestädte (English: High Court of Appeal of the Free Hanseatic Cities), seated in Lübeck was an appeals court of the German Confederation and the North German Confederation with territorial jurisdiction for Bremen, Frankfurt, Hamburg and Lübeck. Frankfurt was removed from the court's jurisdiction in 1867 after its annexation by Prussia. In 1870 the court lost its subject-matter jurisdiction for commercial law to the Reichsoberhandelsgericht and was altogether abolished in 1879.

The court was considered to be the most influential German court of its time due to its exemplary combination of theory and practice.

== Establishment of the court (1806–1820) ==
After the disintegration of the Holy Roman Empire the Oberappellationsgericht der vier Freien Städte was established as the third and last court of appeal in civil and criminal matters for the former free imperial cities Bremen, Frankfurt am Main, Hamburg and Lübeck, as well as Bergedorf.

The legal basis for the court was Article 12 paragraph 3 of the German Federal Act of 1815 ("The four free cities are entitled to unite among themselves on the establishment of a common supreme court.") The inclusion of this paragraph in the Federal Act was an exception in favour of the Free Cities, which even together did not have the number of 300,000 "souls" that were in principle a prerequisite for the formation of a supreme court according to Article 12, paragraph 1. Because there was initially resistance to the establishment of a higher court, especially in Hamburg and Lübeck, in particular due to the feared loss of power of the senates vis-à-vis an independent judiciary, it took 14 years from the original initiative of Bremen in 1806 to its implementation.

== Workings of the court from 1820 to 1879 ==
In 1820, the court began its operations. The court consisted of a president, normally 6 judges, a secretary and two registrars. The court initially had 8 and from 1831 six procurators. One of these procurators was Friedrich Crome from 1856.

Under its first president, Georg Arnold Heise – a co-founder of the German Historical School –, who presided over the court from 1820 until his death in Lübeck in 1851, the court gained a high reputation. With regard to him, Bernhard Windscheid expressed the view that the two highest honours for a jurist in Germany were to succeed Friedrich Carl von Savigny on his chair in Berlin or to take Heise's place in Lübeck. Through Heinrich Thöl in particular, the court had a considerable influence on the development of German commercial law.

Outside its jurisdiction, it was first chosen by Bavaria and Prussia and later also from time to time by other states as a court of arbitration in disputes between states. In addition, the court was responsible for examining aspiring jurists from the four cities.

The court's second president, Karl Georg von Wächter, was in office for just under a year from 1851 to 1852, until he returned to university.

Under the third and last president, Johann Friedrich Martin Kierulff, serving from 1852 until the court's dissolution in 1879, the court gained jurisdiction as the first and last instance for cases of high treason and treason against the state in the North German Confederation, but otherwise had to relinquish more and more competencies.

First of all, Frankfurt left the association on 1 January 1867 after losing its sovereignty due to the Prussian annexation, whereupon the name of the court was changed to Oberappellationsgericht der Freien Hansestädte for short. This was followed by the transfer of subject-matter jurisdiction for commercial law to the Reichsoberhandelsgericht in Leipzig and finally, with the reorganisation of the court constitution by the Reichsjustizgesetze, the court was dissolved on 30 September 1879. Proceedings were taken over by the Hanseatisches Oberlandesgericht in Hamburg or the Reichsgericht in Leipzig, depending on subject-matter jurisdiction.

Rudolf von Jhering in 1879 paid tribute to the court in an obituary of Agathon Wunderlich – a judge of the court who died in 1878 – and described it as "the learned court of Germany".

Thus, the Lübeck Court of Appeal could be described as the learned court of Germany, and German legal science has passed the test, to which it was called here in connection with legal practice, with glory; the Lübeck judgments were among those to which the practitioner as well as the theorist paid tribute in equal measure, there were true masterpieces among them, uniform in form and content, achievements that outweighed entire thick legal monographs on a few pages

— Rudolf von Jhering

== Successor courts and institutions ==
The Hanseatisches Oberlandesgericht retained jurisdiction for Lübeck within the scope of its subject-matter jurisdiction (especially in civil law matters) until the abolition of Lübeck's statehood in 1937. Afterwards, Lübeck came under the jurisdiction of the Oberlandesgericht Kiel until the Schleswig-Holsteinisches Oberlandesgericht was formed after the Second World War. For Bremen, the Hanseatic Higher Regional Court in Hamburg retained jurisdiction responsible until the Hanseatisches Oberlandesgericht in Bremen was established in 1947. For appeals against judgements of the Prussian Court of Appeal in Frankfurt, the Preußisches Obertribunal (the Prussian Supreme Tribunal) in Berlin was the court of last instance after Frankfurt left the jurisdiction of the Oberappellationsgericht der vier Freien Städte. Since 1879, Frankfurt has also been the seat of a Higher Regional Court.

In 1890, as compensation for the loss of the Oberappellationsgericht der vier Freien Städte, Lübeck became the seat of the Hanseatic Insurance Institution (the Hanseatische Versicherungsanstalt, later the State Insurance Institution of the Hanseatic Cities), which was responsible for the disability and old-age insurance of employees in the three Hanseatic cities of Hamburg, Bremen and Lübeck due to the efforts of Senator Karl Peter Klügmann. This, too, went to Hamburg in 1937 with the loss of statehood through the Greater Hamburg Act.

== Courthouse ==
The court was or a short time based in Schüsselbuden No. 15 (Lübeck), then in Königstraße No. 21 (Lübeck), the former house of the Lübeck Zirkelgesellschaft.

After 1879 the courthouse was used by the Lübeck State Archives under the first state archivist Carl Friedrich Wehrmann. In 1936, the state archives passed it on to the public library, which gave it to the Katharineum, among others, after completing its extension buildings in Hundestraße.

The listed building was extensively renovated and converted into an education, meeting and memorial centre for the German Chancellor and Nobel Peace Prize laureate Willy Brandt, who was born in Lübeck. On 18 December 2007, the Federal Chancellor Willy Brandt Foundation opened the Willy Brandt House, Lübeck, a branch office of the foundation. The building was made available by the city free of charge and is used by both the foundation and the municipal office for the preservation of historical monuments. The renovation, which cost almost 2.8 million euros, was supported by the German Foundation for Monument Protection.

== Collection of decisions ==
The decisions of the court have been published in different collections. An important collection was the one published by the court's third president, Johann Friedrich Kierulff, named "Sammlung der Entscheidungen des Oberappellationsgerichts der vier freien Städte zu Lübeck". The case collection has been published in seven volumes and covers the years from 1865 to 1872.

== Judges of the court ==
=== Presidents of the court ===
No.	Portrait	Judge	Took office	Left office	Ref.
1	Georg Arnold Heise	Georg Arnold Heise (1778–1851)	13 November 1820	1850	
2	Karl Georg von Wächter	Karl Georg von Wächter (1797–1880)	1851	1852	
3	Johann Friedrich Kierulff [de]	Johann Friedrich Kierulff (1806–1894)	30 December 1853	1879	

=== Judges of the court ===
No.	Portrait	Judge	Took office	Left office	Ref.
1	Johann Friedrich Hach [de]	Johann Friedrich Hach (1769–1851)	13 November 1820	1850 or 1851	
2	Gottfried Samuel Müller	Gottfried Samuel Müller (1776–1842)	13 November 1820	10 February 1842 (died)	
3	Burkhard Wilhelm Pfeiffer	Burkhard Wilhelm Pfeiffer (1777–1852)	13 November 1820	24 October 1821	
4	Friedrich Cropp [de]	Friedrich Cropp (1790–1832)	13 November 1820	8 August 1832 (died)	
5	Arnold Ludwig Georg Christian Philipp Lüder	Arnold Ludwig Georg Christian Philipp Lüder (1784–1823)	12 April 1821	23 January 1823 (died)	
6	Albrecht Schweppe [de]	Albrecht Schweppe (1783–1829)	8 January 1822 (or 1821)	23 May 1829	
7	Carl Gustav Adolph Gruner	Carl Gustav Adolph Gruner (born 1778)	17 September 1822	2 May 1826	
8	Christian Gerhard Overbeck	Christian Gerhard Overbeck (1784–1846)	28 May 1824	29 January 1846 (died)	
9	Georg August Wilhelm du Roi [de]	Georg August Wilhelm du Roi (1787–1853)	11 October 1826	1853	
10	Ignatz Maria Goll	Ignatz Maria Goll (1774–1848)	26 February 1830	1848	
11	Friedrich Bluhme [de]	Friedrich Bluhme (1797–1874)	6 June 1833	16 April 1843	
12	Georg Friedrich Ludwig Oppenheimer [de]	Georg Friedrich Ludwig Oppenheimer (1805–1884)	31 August 1842	1853	
13	Carl Wilhelm Pauli [de]	Carl Wilhelm Pauli (1792–1879)	4 July 1843	31 December 1876	
14	Ernst Adolf Theodor Laspeyres [de]	Ernst Adolf Theodor Laspeyres (1800–1869)	12 August 1846 or 1843	1876	
15	Ludwig Heinrich Wiederhold [de]	Ludwig Heinrich Wiederhold (1801–1850)	25 November 1846	8 March 1850 (died)	
16	Gottlob Friedrich Walter Agathon Wunderlich	Gottlob Friedrich Walter Agathon Wunderlich (1810–1878)	13 November 1850	1878	
17	Hermann Friedrich Brandis [de]	Hermann Friedrich Brandis (1809–1893)	13 June 1851 or 1852	1879	
18	Johann Friedrich Voigt [de]	Johann Friedrich Voigt (1806–1886)	15 December 1853	1870	
19	Ernst Wilhelm Louis Carl Zimmermann [de]	Ernst Wilhelm Louis Carl Zimmermann (1812–1877)	16 June 1854	1877	
20	Carl August Eduard Drechsler [de]	Carl August Eduard Drechsler (1821–1897)	2 May 1864 or 1854	1877	
21	Rudolph Heinrich Anton Eckermann	Rudolph Heinrich Anton Eckermann	1871	1879	
22	Christian David Rudolf Schlesinger [de]	Christian David Rudolf Schlesinger (1831–1912)	18 October 1870	1879	
23	Richard Eduard John [de]	Richard Eduard John (1827–1889)	18 October 1870	1879	
24	Carl August Ludwig Friedrich Lehmann [de]	Carl August Ludwig Friedrich Lehmann (1833–1909)	22 May 1876	1879	
25	Carl Ernst August Ludwig Hoppenstedt [de]	Carl Ernst August Ludwig Hoppenstedt (1834–1910)	5 April 1877	1879	
26	Georg Heinrich Ritter	Georg Heinrich Ritter	11 October 1877	1879	
