= Otto Wunderlich =

German photographer

- Born: 1886
- Died: 1975 (aged 88–89); Madrid, Spain
- Known for: Photography

Otto Wunderlich (1886 in Stuttgart – 1975 in Madrid) was a German photographer who worked mainly in Spain.

He started working for a mineral trading company when he arrived in Spain in 1913. He became a professional photographer in 1917, travelling around Spain and selling albums and post cards with the title Paisajes y Monumentos de España (Landscapes and monuments of Spain).

His photos were published in magazines like Blanco y Negro, La Esfera and El Mundo. In 1927, he established his own studio at 47, Doctor Esquerdo Street in Madrid where he continued working and publishing in newspapers and magazines until the mid 20th century. In 1931, he worked for the National Tourism Trust of Spain.

== See also ==
- Wunderlich (disambiguation)
