= Carl Georg von Wächter =

German jurist (1797–1880)

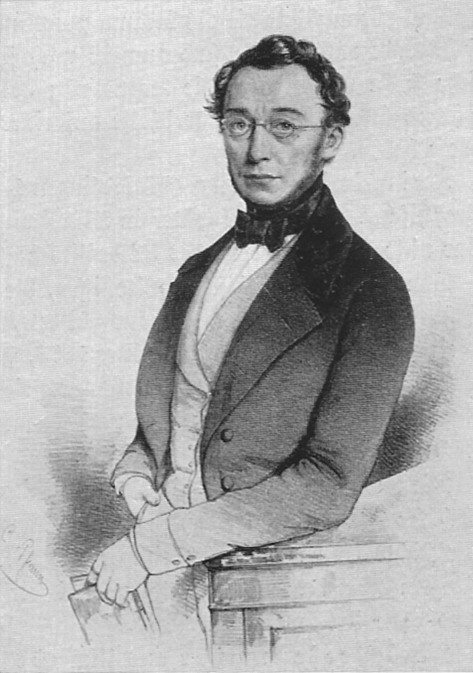

2nd President of the Oberappellationsgericht der vier Freien Städte
- In office 1851–1852
- Preceded by: Georg Arnold Heise
- Succeeded by: Johann Friedrich Kierulff

Personal details
- Born: Carl Joseph Georg Sigismund Wächter; 24 December 1797 Marbach am Neckar, Electorate of Württemberg, Holy Roman Empire
- Died: 15 January 1880 (aged 82) Leipzig, Kingdom of Saxony, German Empire
- Children: Oskar von Wächter

Carl Joseph Georg Sigismund Wächter, from 1835 von Wächter, (24 December 1797 – 15 January 1880) was a leading German jurist in the 19th century. For a brief period he served as president of the Oberappellationsgericht der vier Freien Städte.

== Biography ==
=== Early life and education ===
Carl Georg Wächter was born on 24 December 1797 in Marbach am Neckar. He came from an old Württemberg civil servant family with Saxon roots. He was born the sixth of nine children and was the only son of the lawyer Johann Eberhard von Wächter (1762–1839) and his wife Caroline Luise née von Bühler (1769–1833). Carl Georg von Wächter was a nephew of the Württembergian interior minister Karl Eberhard von Wächter and a cousin of the Württembergian minister Karl von Waechter-Spittler. Carl Georg von Wächter's paternal grandparents were Eberhard von Wächter (1735–1807), Württemberg court and finance councillor, and Maria Regina née Sigel (1733–1798), on his mother's side Friedrich Gottlob (von) Bühler (1736–1799) and Christine Regina née Feucht (born 1743).

Wächter attended a Latin school in Eßlingen and the Gymnasium in Stuttgart. In 1815, after much deliberation, he began studying law. Originally he had wanted to study medicine, but his father thought of theology for his son. In the end, this was decided by King Frederick I of Württemberg, who at that time still approved every course of study by himself and determined that the study of law was the right course for Wächter because his father had also studied law ("Should become a lawyer because his father is a lawyer").

From 8 April 1815 Wächter studied law at the University of Tübingen. One of Wächter's professors there was Eduard von Schrader. It was not until 1817 that studies abroad – even in other German states and territories – were permitted. In the same year, Wächter completed a semester in Heidelberg to study under Thibaut and Welcker, but then returned to Tübingen. As early as December 1818, Wächter passed his Erstes Staatsexamen (the first state examination) with the grade "Excellent".

=== Academic life ===
In 1819 Wächter was appointed assessor at the court in Esslingen am Neckar. But on 13 August 1819 he already became an associate professor of law in Tübingen and in 1822 became a full professor and a Doctor of Law. His dissertation was named Doctrina de conditione causa data causa non secuta in contractibus innominatis.

From 1825 to 1833, Wächter was professor of law at the University of Tübingen and was also rector and vice-chancellor there from 1825 to 1828. From 1833 to 1835 he taught at Leipzig University, but returned to Tübingen and was Chancellor of that university from 1835 to 1851 and as such also a member and later President (1839–1848) of the Württemberg Chamber of Deputies of the Landtag. He was made an honorary citizen of the city of Tübingen. In 1848 he was a member of the Vorparlament.

In 1851, Wächter went to Lübeck and became the president of the Oberappellationsgericht der vier Freien Städte succeeding Heise.

From 1852, Wächter again became a professor of law at the University of Leipzig and was appointed a member of the State Council by the King of Saxony in 1855 and was Rector of the university from 1858 to 1860. In 1859, as rector of the university, which was celebrating its 450th anniversary, he was made an honorary citizen of the city of Leipzig. Since 1854 he was a full member of the Saxon Academy of Sciences and Humanities.

In 1860, he became one of the co-founders of the Deutscher Juristentag, of which he also became the first president. He was re-elected five times to this office. In 1867 he was elected to the constituent Reichstag of the North German Confederation. In 1869, he was appointed a privy councillor and elevated to the Saxon nobility.

During his lifetime, Wächter was described as "the greatest German jurist of all time". He died on the 15 January 1880 in Leipzig.

He was buried on the Röcknitz manor (today a district of Thallwitz near Leipzig), which his youngest son Karl Alfred von Wächter had acquired in 1872.

=== Death ===
After his death, a street in Leipzig's neighbourhood Musikviertel was named after him in 1884, and in 1897 the Leipzig City Council established the "Karl-Georg-von-Wächtersche Stiftung" (Karl Georg von Wächter Foundation), the interest on which, amounting to 120 gold marks annually, paid for a scholarship.

== Family ==
In 1822 he married Johanne Emilie Baumeister (1802–1880) from Hamburg. This marriage produced two sons and two daughters. The elder of the two sons, the lawyer and politician Oskar von Wächter (1825–1902), was also a member of the Second Chamber of the Württemberg Estates. He wrote a biography of his father and posthumously published his Pandekten and lectures on German criminal law. The much younger son, the Royal Chamberlain Baron Karl Alfred von Wächter (1842–1914), studied agriculture in Hohenheim and earned a doctorate in philosophy in Leipzig, where he had already attended the St Nicholas School. In 1872, he bought the manor house in Röcknitz (Saxony) and in 1875 married Rosalie née Freiin von Soden from Stuttgart, daughter of Baron August Warren Hastings von Soden (1818–1859) and his wife Karoline (Lilli), née Holzschuher (1829–1912). He was founder and chairman of the local agricultural association, member of the 1st Chamber of Estates and chairman of the Leipzig Agricultural District Association, from 1901 onwards on the supervisory board of the Hohburger Quarz-Porphyr-Werke AG and in 1909 was appointed Privy Councillor for Economics. In the Festgabe der Deutschen Juristen-Zeitung zum 500jährigen Jubiläum der Universität Leipzig (ed. by Otto Liebmann. Berlin: Liebmann, 1909, sp. 127–129) he published, among others, a short tribute to his father.

== Published works ==
A complete bibliography of von Wächter's works is given by Christoph Mauntel. His major works include:

=== Books ===
- von Wächter, Carl Georg (1822). Doctrina de condictione causa data causa non secuta in contractibus innominatis (in Latin). Tübingen.
- ——————————— (1825). Lehrbuch des Römisch-Teutschen Strafrechts: Erster Theil, enthaltend die Einleitung und den allgemeinen Theil (in German). Vol. I. Stuttgart: J.B. Metzler’sche Buchhandlung.
- ——————————— (1826). Lehrbuch des Römisch-Teutschen Strafrechts: Zweyter Theil, enthaltend den besonderen Theil des Strafrechts (in German). Vol. II. Stuttgart: J.B. Metzler’sche Buchhandlung.
- ——————————— (1839). Handbuch des im Königreiche Württemberg geltenden Privatrechts: Geschichte, Quellen und Literatur des Württembergischen Privatrechts (in German). Vol. I-1. Stuttgart: J.B. Metzler’sche Buchhandlung. OCLC 165102984.
- ——————————— (1842). Handbuch des im Königreiche Württemberg geltenden Privatrechts: Geschichte, Quellen und Literatur des Württembergischen Privatrechts (in German). Vol. I-2. Stuttgart: J.B. Metzler’sche Buchhandlung. OCLC 165102988.
- ——————————— (1842). Handbuch des im Königreiche Württemberg geltenden Privatrechts: Allgemeine Lehren (in German). Vol. II. Stuttgart: J.B. Metzler’sche Buchhandlung. OCLC 311571212.
- ——————————— (1845). Beiträge zur deutschen Geschichte insbesondere zur Geschichte des Deutschen Strafrechts (in German). Tübingen: Ludwig Friedrich Fues.
- ——————————— (1845). Erörterungen aus dem römischen, deutschen und württembergischen Privatrechte (in German). Vol. I. Stuttgart: Verlag der J. B. Metzler'schen Buchhandlung.
- ——————————— (1846). Erörterungen aus dem römischen, deutschen und württembergischen Privatrechte (in German). Vol. II. Stuttgart: Verlag der J. B. Metzler'schen Buchhandlung.
- ——————————— (1846). Erörterungen aus dem römischen, deutschen und württembergischen Privatrechte (in German). Vol. III. Stuttgart: Verlag der J. B. Metzler'schen Buchhandlung.
- ——————————— (1863). Commentationis de partu vivo non vitali (in Latin). Vol. I. Leipzig: A. Edelmannum.
- ——————————— (1864). Commentationis de partu vivo non vitali (in Latin). Vol. II. Leipzig: A. Edelmannum.
- ——————————— (1864). Commentationis de partu vivo non vitali (in Latin). Vol. III. Leipzig: A. Edelmannum.
- ——————————— (1865). Commentationis de partu vivo non vitali (in Latin). Vol. IV. Leipzig: A. Edelmannum.
- ——————————— (1866). Commentationis de partu vivo non vitali (in Latin). Vol. V. Leipzig: A. Edelmannum.
- ——————————— (1871). Die bona fides, insbesondere bei der Ersitzung des Eigenthums (in German). Leipzig: Alexander Edelmann.
- ——————————— (1880). von Wächter, Otto (ed.). Pandekten: Allgemeiner Theil (in German). Vol. I. Leipzig: Breitkopf und Härtel.
- ——————————— (1881). ———————— (ed.). Pandekten: Besonderer Theil (in German). Vol. II. Leipzig: Breitkopf und Härtel.
- ——————————— (1881). ———————— (ed.). Pandekten: Besonderer Theil (in German). Vol. II. Leipzig: Breitkopf und Härtel.
- ——————————— (1881). ———————— (ed.). Deutsches Strafrecht: Vorlesungen von Carl-Georg von Wächter (in German). Leipzig.

=== Journal articles ===
- von Wächter, Carl Georg (1834). "Ueber Testirunfähigkeit wegen begangener Verbrechen und wegen verhängter Strafen". Archiv für die civilistische Praxis (in German). 17 (3): 420–440. ISSN 0003-8997. JSTOR 41003775.
- ——————————— (1841). "Ueber die Collision der Privatrechtsgesetze verschiedener Staaten". Archiv für die civilistische Praxis (in German). 24 (2/3): 230–311. JSTOR 41037436.
- ——————————— (1842). "Ueber die Collision der Privatrechtsgesetze verschiedener Staaten (Fortsetzung)". Archiv für die civilistische Praxis (in German). 25 (2): 161–200. JSTOR 41037440.
- ——————————— (1842). "Ueber die Collision der Privatrechtsgesetze verschiedener Staaten (Schluß)". Archiv für die civilistische Praxis (in German). 25 (3): 361–419. JSTOR 41037449.

== Honours and recognitions ==
- 1835 Knight's Cross of the Order of the Württemberg Crown, associated with personal nobility
- 1836 Honorary citizen of the city of Tübingen
- 1839 Commander's Cross of the Order of the Württemberg Crown
- 1859 Honorary Citizen of the City of Leipzig
- 1861 Bavarian Order of Maximilian for Science and Art
- 1879 Awarded the hereditary nobility of the Kingdom of Saxony
- 1884 Wächterstraße was named after him in Leipzig
- 1887 The city of Leipzig endowed the Karl-Georg-von-Wächter Foundation
- 1904 Wächterstraße was named after him in Dresden

== Sources ==
- Ritter von Eisenhart, Johann August (1896). "Wächter, Karl Georg von" . Allgemeine Deutsche Biographie (in German). Vol. 40. Leipzig: Duncker & Humblot. pp. 435–440..
- von Georgii-Georgenau, Eberhard Emil (1879). "Waechter". Biographisch-genealogische Blaetter aus und ueber Schwaben (in German). Stuttgart: E. Mueller. pp. 1037–1048.
- Mauntel, Christoph (2004). Carl Georg von Wächter (1797–1880): Rechtswissenschaft im Frühkonstitutionalismus (in German). Paderborn: Schöningh. ISBN 978-3-506-71689-7.
- von Wächter, Oskar (1881). Carl Georg von Wächter: Leben eines deutschen Juristen. Leipzig: Breitkopf & Härtel.
