= Willy Brandt House, Lübeck =

Museum in Lübeck, Germany

Coordinates: 53°52′11″N 10°41′22″E

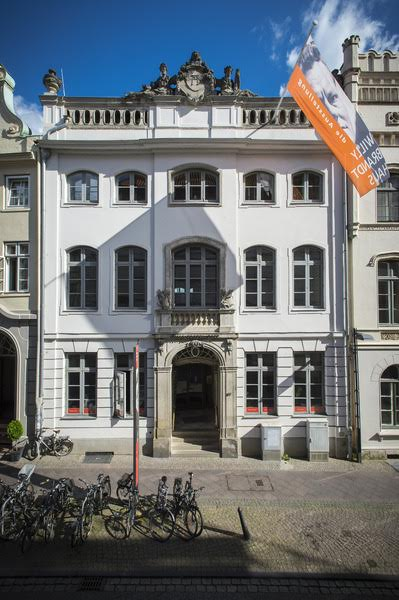
The Willy-Brandt-Haus in Lübeck 2015

The Willy-Brandt-Haus in Lübeck is a museum and a memorial to the late politician Federal Chancellor and Nobel Peace Prize Laureate, Willy Brandt, of the Social Democratic Party of Germany (SPD).

The Berlin based branch of the Federal Chancellor Willy Brandt Foundation also houses the Office of Monumental Protection of the Hanseatic city of Lübeck, in Schleswig-Holstein. It is the third establishment in the city to honor a Nobel Prize laureate from Lübeck.

The director of the Willy-Brandt-Haus is the historian, Jürgen Lillteicher.

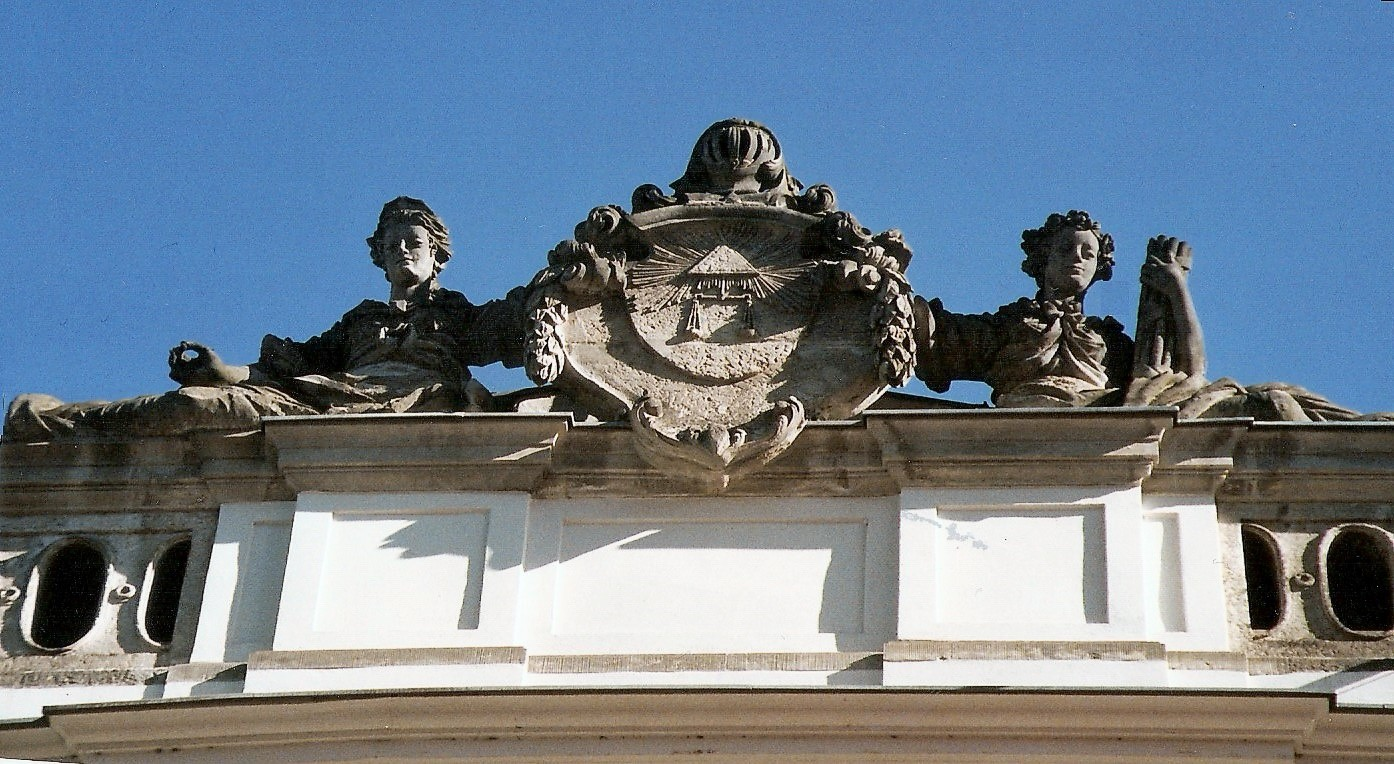
Detail: The symbol of the Zirkelgesellschaft, a fraternity of long-distance merchants

Willy Brandt was not born in this building, but in different house in the Lübeck district of St. Lorenz.

== History ==
The Willy-Brandt House opened on 18 December 2007, on what would have been Willy Brandt's 94th birthday, in his home town of Lübeck. The establishment of a memorial in Willy Brandt's hometown was suggested by Günter Grass, Nobel laureate in literature, who had maintained political ties to him since the 1960s.

The city of Lübeck provided a patrician house in need of restoration on Königstraße 21 for the museum. It was an assembly house of the Zirkelgesellschaft, a fraternity of long-distance merchants, before it became the seat of the Oberappellationsgericht der vier Freien Städte (an appellate court for the cities Bremen, Hamburg, Frankfurt am Main and Lübeck) in the 19th century. It was later used as the State Archive of Lübeck as well as a public library. After years of vacancy, the cost of renovating, converting and furnishing the building came to a sum of 3.8 million euros. The federal republic contributed 2.8 million euros and the German Foundation for Monument Protection contributed one million euros.

In addition to politicians and Günter Grass, Willy Brandt's daughter, Ninja Brandt, his son Peter Brandt, and his widow Brigitte Seebacher attended the inauguration of the museum.

== Exhibition ==
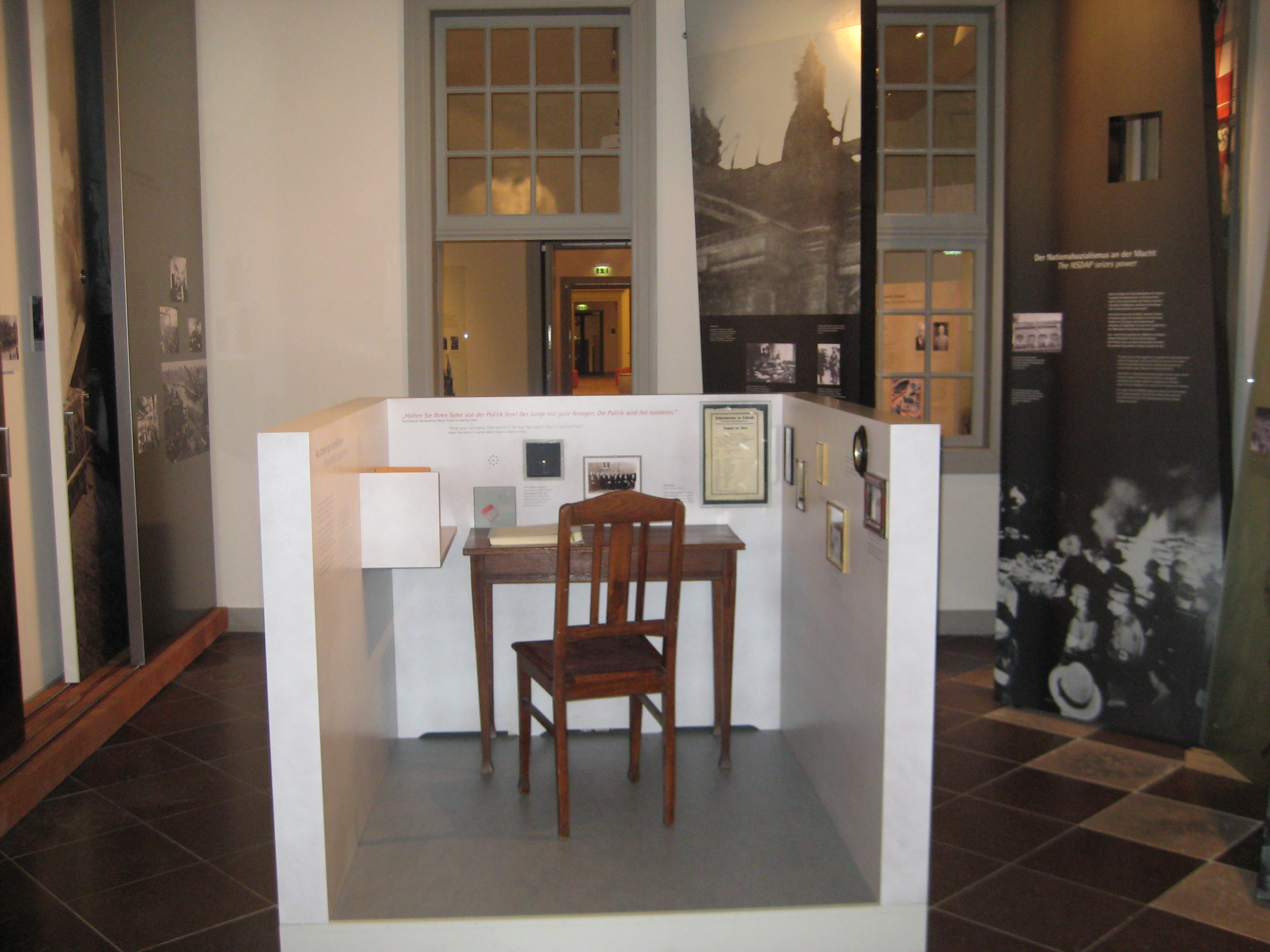
Recreation of Willy Brandt's desk in his youth

The exhibition on the ground floor, divided into six sections arranged chronologically and spatially, tells the story of the life of Willy Brandt.

One room presents Brandt's childhood and youth in Lübeck, followed by his experiences in the resistance movement, escape to Norway by boat and exile. As a reporter, he attended the Nuremberg Trials, after which he recognized the difficulties Germany faced after the war.

His time as the governing mayor of Berlin saw events such as the Berlin ultimatum, the building of the Berlin wall, Kennedy's visit and the step-by-step policy. As a foreign minister and afterwards Chancellor, Brandt followed Ostpolitik, a policy of building relationships with Eastern bloc countries, and called for European unification. A smaller exhibition room shows election campaign posters from 1972, the so-called Willy-Wahl which Brandt won by a landslide victory.

In the final, largest room of the exhibition, international themes are presented: Willy Brandt's "global commitment" for the resolution of North-South disparities, the promotion of peace and freedom, and the assertion of human rights.

In the foyer, a sculpture of Willy Brandt can be found in a niche next to the staircase. The original, larger than life sculpture can be seen in the SPD party headquarters, at the Willy-Brandt-Haus in Berlin. The work of the sculptor Rainer Fetting is a loan from a Lübeck art dealer and his wife. A part of the Berlin Wall can be found in the inner courtyard of the building, which is connected to a small room containing photos from Willy Brandt's private life.

Through the back of the building, one can access the Günter Grass House on Glockengießerstraße. A passage to Bürgergärten in the inner courtyard of Heiligen-Geist-Hospital is under discussion.

In addition to its function as a museum and a memorial, the Willy-Brandt-Haus in Lübeck is a place for political education for all school grades and a venue for seminars by contemporary witnesses and panel discussions. Guided tours for children are also available. Since 2012, pupils have been trained to become young museum guides as part of the project "Youth in the Museum" sponsored by Lübeck-based Michael Haukohl Foundation .
