= Georg Ludolf Dissen =

German philologist (1784–1837)

Georg Ludolf Dissen (17 December 1784 – 21 September 1837) was a German classical philologist who was a native of Groß Schneen, a village in the District of Göttingen.

He studied classical philology at the University of Göttingen, where one of his instructors was Christian Gottlob Heyne (1729-1812). After graduation, he was a lecturer at Göttingen, and in 1812 relocated to the University of Marburg as an associate professor. The following year he returned to Göttingen, where he was a colleague to Friedrich Gottlieb Welcker (1784-1868), Ernst Karl Friedrich Wunderlich (1783-1816) and Karl Otfried Müller (1797-1840). In 1817 he was appointed "full professor", and in 1833 became a full member of the Göttingen Academy of Sciences.

Dissen was considered an excellent teacher, and was an important influence to the development of philologist Karl Lachmann (1793-1851). Among his written works were editions of Pindar (1830), Tibullus (1835) and the orations of Demosthenes (1837). In addition, he collaborated with August Böckh on the latter's masterful edition of Pindar.

He died in Göttingen.
