= Reichsoberhandelsgericht =

Former German federal supreme court (1870–1879)

Imperial High Commercial Court
- Reichsoberhandelsgericht (German)
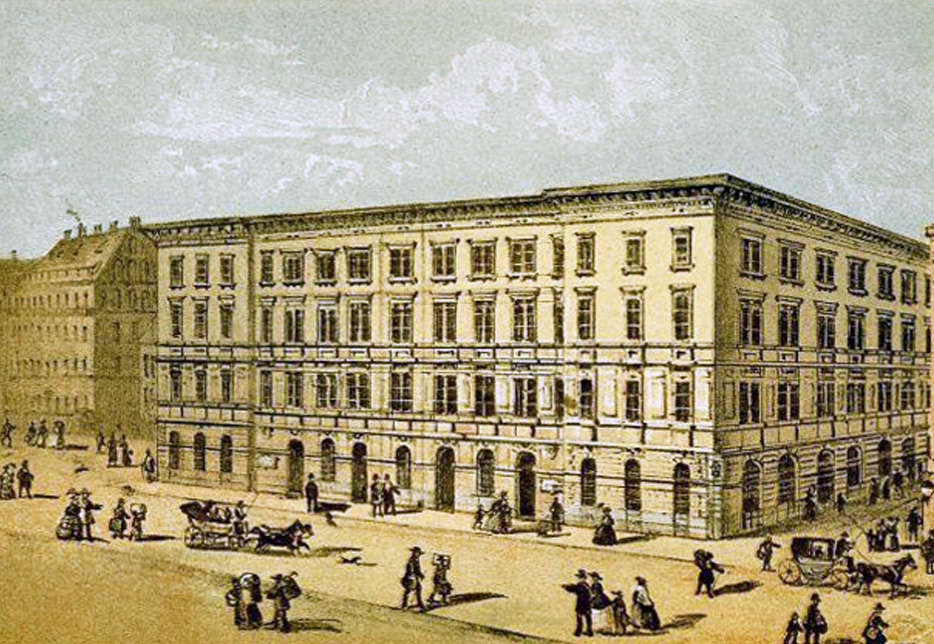
- The Georgenhalle, Leipzig, the seat of the court (c. 1860).
- Interactive map of Imperial High Commercial Court
- 51°20′30″N 12°22′50″E
- Established: 5 August 1870
- Dissolved: 30 September 1879
- Jurisdiction: North German Confederation (1870–1871); German Empire (1871–1879)
- Location: Georgenhalle, Leipzig, Kingdom of Saxony, German Empire
- Coordinates: 51°20′30″N 12°22′50″E
- Language: German

The Reichsoberhandelsgericht, abbreviated ROHG (English: Imperial High Commercial Court), was a short-lived German supreme court seated in Leipzig, which primarily dealt with appeals concerning commercial law, but later expanded its subject-matter jurisdiction. It was the first German court with local jurisdiction for all German territories since the disintegration of the Holy Roman Empire in 1806.

The court was established in 1870 named Bundesoberhandelsgericht, abbreviated BOHG (English: Federal High Commercial Court), as a body of the North German Confederation. After the formation of the German Empire in 1871, it was renamed to Reichsoberhandelsgericht and now had jurisdiction for the whole empire. In 1879, the court was dissolved and replaced by the newly founded Reichsgericht. During the nine years of its existence, the president of the court was Heinrich Eduard von Pape.

== History ==
=== Background ===
With the disintegration of the Holy Roman Empire in 1806, the judicial activities of the two imperial German supreme courts – the Reichskammergericht (Imperial Chamber Court) in Wetzlar and the Reichshofrat (Aulic Council) in Vienna – ended. For more than six decades no federal supreme court existed in the German territories until the Reichsoberhandelsgericht was formed in 1869. During the time of the German Confederation (1815–1866) and the North German Federation (1867–1871) the only court with local jurisdiction for more than one territory was the Oberappellationsgericht der vier Freien Städte (High Court of Appeal of the Four Free Cities) in Lübeck (1820–1879), which had territorial jurisdiction for Bremen, Frankfurt, Hamburg and Lübeck.

The German Confederation did not establish a federal supreme court, because the Confederation left the sovereignty of the individual territories and states largely untouched. But due to the lack of a federal supreme court, some concern existed in the confederation about the fragmentation of the law. These concerns intensified after a uniform German commercial law, the Allgemeines Deutsches Handelsgesetzbuch (General German Commercial Code), was introduced in the Confederation in 1861 without a federal supreme court being able to ensure its uniform application and interpretation. The German Jurists Forum (Deutscher Juristentag), a deliberative congress of German lawyers, therefore called in 1860, 1861, 1863, 1864 and 1867 for the establishment of such a court. In 1860, the German Jurist Forum argued, that at least for the unified areas of law – meaning commercial law and the law on promissory notes – a federal supreme court would be a necessity to ensure a consistent development of the law.

=== Legislative process ===
Two years after the North German Confederation had been formed, the formal legislative process for the establishment of the Bundesoberhandelsgericht was started. On 23 February 1869, Richard von Friesen, the delegate of the Kingdom of Saxony, introduced its bill titled Entwurf eines Gesetzes, betreffend die Errichtung eines obersten Gerichtshofes in Handelssachen (Draft of a law concerning the establishment of a supreme court in commercial matters) in the Bundesrat. The bill proposed the establishment of a Federal High Commercial Court (the Bundesoberhandelsgericht), which should be seated in Leipzig, a Saxon city. The court should be headed by a president and the other members of the court should be a vice-president and a number of ordinary judges. All judges should be appointed on the recommendation of the Bundesrat by its president, the King of Prussia. The bill further set out that the court should have subject-matter jurisdiction for the Allgemeines Deutsches Handelsgesetzbuch and the law on promissory notes. The content of the bill had probably been coordinated beforehand with Prussia.

The bill was referred to the judicial committee of the Bundesrat, the Ausschuss für Justizwesen, on 1 March 1869. The judicial committee examined it on 17 and 18 March 1869 and submitted its report to the plenum of the Bundesrat a few days later. The judicial committee's report proposed only minor revisions. On 5 April 1869, the plenum of the Bundesrat dealt with the bill. During the plenary session, Hesse, Mecklenburg and Hamburg argued that the establishment of the Bundesoberhandelsgericht was beyond the competencies of the North German Confederation and would require an amendment of the federal constitution. Hamburg, together with Lübeck, especially feared that the proposed federal court would result in a loss of influence for its Oberappellationsgericht der vier Freien Städte. But these sceptic voices did not prevail, and the bill passed the Bundesrat with only seven votes against it.

On 5 April 1869, the bill was sent to the Reichstag. In the Reichstag, the bill was debated between 10 April and 13 May 1869. During the parliamentary deliberations Johannes von Miquel notably argued – with a possible German unification in mind – that "from a legal point of view, this Court is provisional, but from a national point of view, it is definitive". The deliberations once more resulted in minor revisions only and the bill was approved by the Reichstag on 13 May 1869. According to the legislative process of the North German Confederation, the bill was then sent back to the Bundesrat again, which finally approved it against the opposition of both Mecklenburgs, Bremen and Hamburg.

William I gave his royal assent to the bill on 12 June 1869 and on 18 June 1869 the Gesetz, betreffend die Errichtung eines obersten Gerichtshofes für Handelssachen was published in the official gazette of the North German Confederation, the Bundesgesetzblatt des Norddeutschen Bundes.

=== Establishment ===
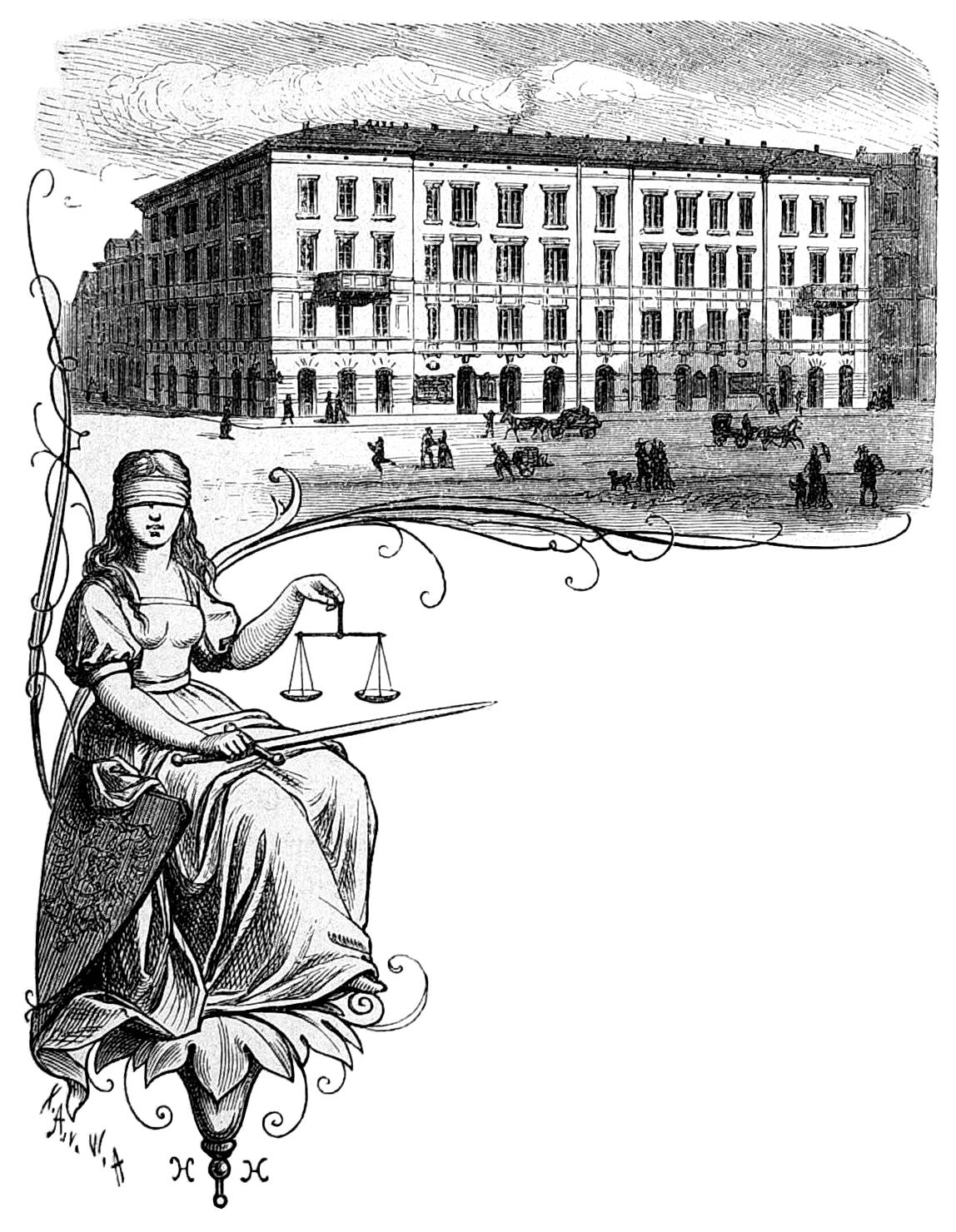
A view of the Georgenhalle in an 1879 issue of the Die Gartenlaube

After the law establishing the Bundesoberhandelsgericht was promulgated, an ordinance dated 22 June 1870 decreed its entry into force on 5 August 1870. On that day, the court constituted itself in Leipzig. Contrary to original plans, Otto von Bismarck – then the Chancellor of the North German Confederation – was unable to attend the court's investiture in the Georgenhalle, the seat of the court in Leipzig, due to the outbreak of the Franco-Prussian War. During the ceremonies, the court's president, Heinrich Eduard von Pape, swore in the court's first judges and remarked on the importance of the establishment of the court for future German national and legal unity.

=== Life of the court ===
After the formation of the German Empire in 1871, the Bundesoberhandelsgericht was no longer a court of the North German Confederation but of the recently founded empire. It was accordingly renamed to Reichsoberhandelsgericht on 2 September 1871 by a plenary declaration of its members. The renaming reflected the new responsibilities for the whole of the empire including Bavaria, Württemberg, Baden and Hesse.

In 1871, the court attained minor additions to its subject-matter jurisdiction. It was now also responsible for the law of the Flösserei (timber rafting), some copyright law and tort liability concerning the operation of railways. After the defeat of France in the Franco-Prussian War, Alsace–Lorraine became part of the German Empire. This territorial gain started the process of expanding the court's subject-matter jurisdiction beyond the confines of commercial law. Shortly after the war, a law dated 14 June 1871 was passed which established the court as the supreme court for Alsace–Lorraine effective 28 August 1871. The court thereby took the place of the French Court of Cassation in Paris for all cases stemming from this territory. This was of major importance because the court was now competent to hear criminal cases from this territory and was thus in a position to rule on the new German Criminal Code of 1871.

In 1873, the court was asked to adjudicate an interstate dispute between Saxe-Meiningen and Schwarzburg-Rudolstadt, two states of the German Empire. It should function as a court of arbitration for a dispute about the dominion over the village Unterwirbach. After Bismarck's approval, the court agreed to take the case and rendered an arbitral award in 1876.

Between 1873 and 1876, the subject-matter jurisdiction of the court expanded again. The court then, inter alia, gained jurisdiction for the adjudication of trademark and banking law. After the passage of the German patent act, discussions concerning the addition of patent law to the court's jurisdiction started in 1877 and the court was asked to compile regulations to handle this new material. After these were finished, the court attained appellate authority for patent law on 1 May 1878 by the passage of an ordinance from the same day.

=== Succession of the court ===
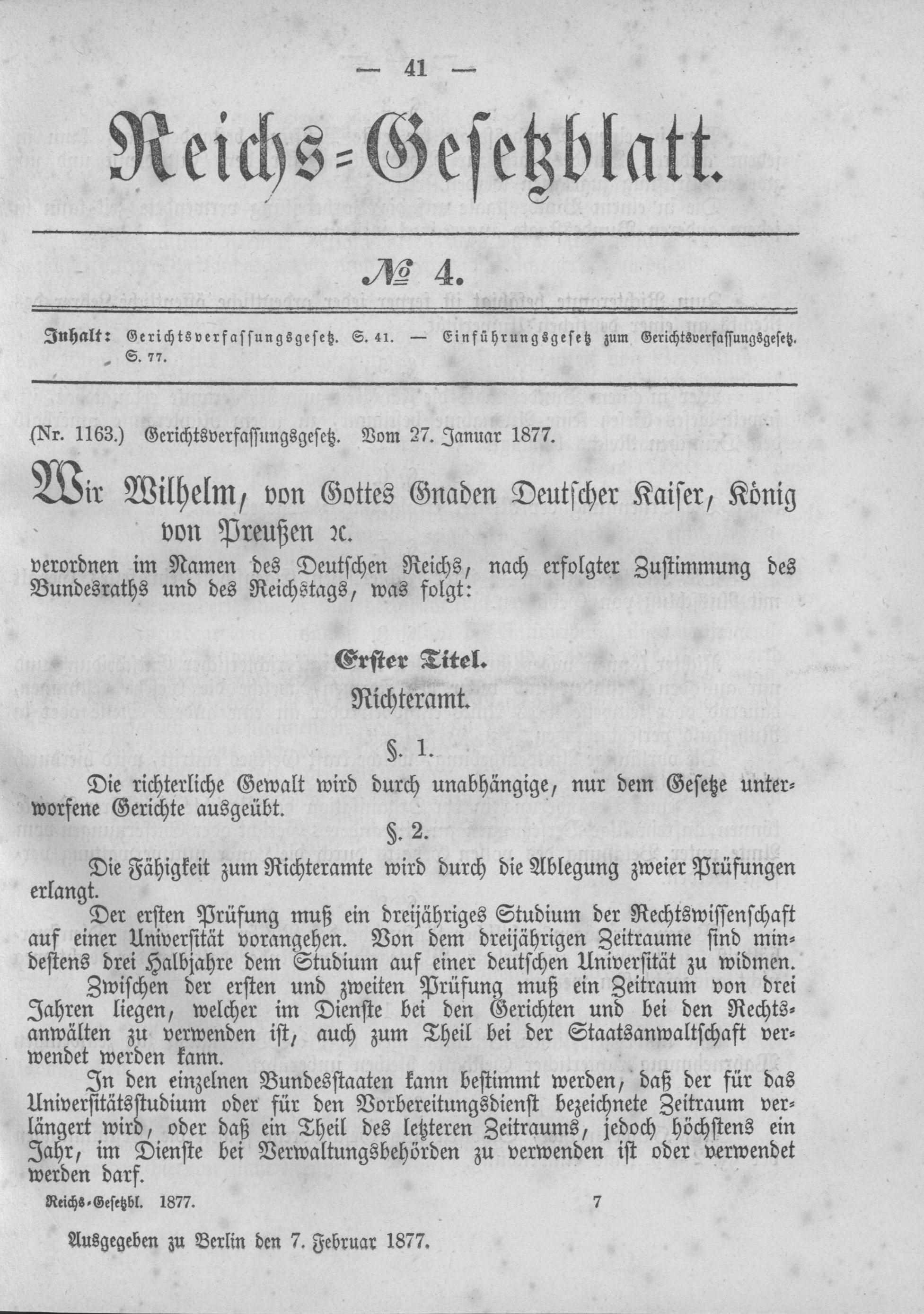
The Gerichtsverfassungsgesetz, part of the Reichsjustizgesetze of 1871, in the Reichsgesetzblatt

Before the Reichsjustizgesetze of 1878 entered into force on 1 October 1879, the Reichsoberhandelsgericht had to conclude its position as a German supreme court on 30 September 1879. On 1 October 1879, the Reichsoberhandelsgericht was succeeded by the Reichsgericht.

=== Historical assessment ===
The case law of the Reichsoberhandelsgericht had a lasting influence on the practice and teaching of German promissory notes law and commercial law in general. As a judge of the court, Levin Goldschmidt argued that it was the natural task of the court to preserve unity in the application of the law and to further the development of the unified areas of law. Due to the expansion of its subject-matter jurisdiction, many contemporaries saw the court not as a special court for commercial law but as a general German supreme court, a view that is shared by commentators today. Andreas M. Fleckner, a legal scholar, argued that the court proved to be the hoped-for keystone for the unification of German commercial law and that its establishment was an unexpectedly large step for the unification of German civil law in general. Fellow legal scholar Regina Ogorek observed that the court marked the institutional beginning of the end of an epoch of fragmentation in the law.

The establishment of the court commenced an institutional tradition that has continued through the Reichsgericht to today's Bundesgerichtshof. Exemplary for this tradition is the collection of its important cases named Entscheidungen des Reichsoberhandelsgerichts (Judgments of the Imperial High Commercial Court), abbreviated ROHGE or BOHGE, in whose tradition the later Entscheidungen des Reichsgerichts (Judgments of the Imperial Court), abbreviated RGZ/RGSt, and the Entscheidungen des Bundesgerichtshofs (Judgments of the Federal Court of Justice), abbreviated BGHZ/BGHSt, still stand today.

== Organisation ==
=== Panels ===
Originally, the Reichsoberhandelsgericht had no panels, the decisions therefore had to be taken in plenary sessions. This was rectified with effect from 1 September 1871 when the court formed two panels. The first panel (Erster Senat) was chaired by the court's president, Heinrich Eduard von Pape, while the second panel (Zweiter Senat) was led by its vice president August Drechsler. On 9 July 1874, a third panel (Dritter Senat) was formed and chaired by Karl Hocheder, who became a further vice president. The president distributed the cases to the individual panels. To render a decision seven judges had to participate in a case and a majority for the decision had to be found.

=== Lawyers before the court ===
Any qualified lawyer or advocate – a unified bar was not created in the German Empire until 1879 – could plead before the Reichsoberhandelsgericht. No singular admission (Singularzulassung) existed.

== Jurisdiction ==
The Reichsoberhandelsgericht could hear appeals when it had local and subject-matter jurisdiction. When it was competent, it replaced the supreme court of the respective German territory for this case.

=== Local jurisdiction ===
In 1870, the local jurisdiction of the court extended throughout the North German Confederation. When the North German Confederation was succeeded by the German Empire in 1871, the local jurisdiction of the court was now the Empire's territory. The last extension of the court's local jurisdiction happened on 14 June 1871, when the Reichsoberhandelsgericht succeeded the French Court of Cassation for all appeals concerning cases originating from Alsace–Lorraine.

=== Subject-matter jurisdiction ===
As the name of the court suggests it was originally conceived as a civil court for commercial law matters. Accordingly, its subject-matter jurisdiction only extended to cases concerning commercial law. Section 13 of the court's establishment statue elaborated what specific commercial law questions were covered. Later the court's subject-matter jurisdiction was rapidly expanded by statute. For example, matters concerning copyright law, patent law and trademark law were added to the court's docket. But not only newly developing matters like intellectual property law were added, even some specific matters of general civil law – for example matters concerning strict liability for operators of trains – were added to the court's subject-matter jurisdiction. For Alsace–Lorraine, the court even gained jurisdiction in criminal matters, but private law still remained firmly at the centre of the court's jurisdiction.

== Collection of decisions ==
All of the 12,173 decisions (Note: Reynolds 1997, p. 162 lists 11,236 cases.) of the Reichsoberhandelsgericht have been preserved in the 82 volumes of the Sammlung Sämmtlicher Erkenntnisse des Reichs-Oberhandelsgerichts (Collection of all findings of the Imperial High Commercial Court), which is now housed at the Federal Court of Justice in Karlsruhe. Of those 12,173 decisions, the court identified 2,764 (22.7%) as its most important decisions and published them in its authoritative collection Entscheidungen des Reichsoberhandelsgerichts (Judgments of the Imperial High Commercial Court; 25 volumes). A. Stegemann, a lawyer, also collected and published some cases of the court in the 8 volumes of Die Rechtsprechung des deutschen Oberhandelsgerichtes zu Leipzig (The case law of the German High Commercial Court in Leipzig).

== Judges ==
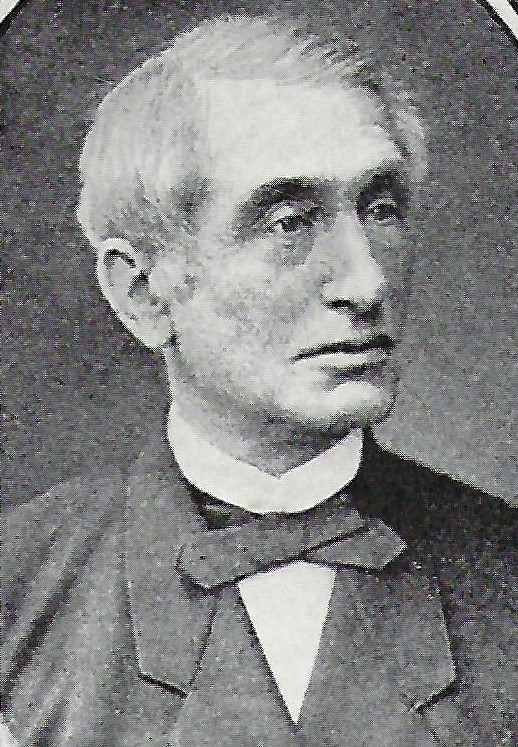
Heinrich Eduard von Pape, the only president of the Reichsoberhandelsgericht

During the nine years of its existence, the Reichsoberhandelsgericht had only one president, Heinrich Eduard von Pape. The court had two vice-presidents – August Drechsler and Karl Hocheder (the latter joining it in 1873) – and 29 judges (Reichsoberhandelsgerichtsräte) in total. The formal requirement to become a judge of the court was the eligibility to serve at a high court in one of the German territories or to be a professor of law in Germany, Levin Goldschmidt being the only professor of law serving at the court in its initial composition (though later other professors joined it, e.g. Robert Römer). All judges had life tenure.

Of the 32 judges of the Reichsoberhandelsgericht, 20 transferred to the service of the newly formed Reichsgericht in 1879. The court's president von Pape did not transfer, he became the chairperson of the first commission to draft a German Civil Code, an activity which in 1896 resulted in the momentous promulgation of the Bürgerliches Gesetzbuch (the German Civil Code).

=== President ===
No.	Name	Assumption of office	End of office	Transfer to the Reichsgericht	Ref.
1	Heinrich Eduard von Pape (1816–1888)	1 July 1870 or 5 August 1870 (Note: If the dates concerning the assumption or end of office conflict between sources, the first date is the one given by Lobe 1929 and the second date the one provided by Reynolds 1997.)	30 September 1879	No (became the chairperson of the first commission for a German Civil Code)	

=== Vice-presidents ===
No.	Name	Assumption of office	End of office	Transfer to the Reichsgericht	Ref.
1	August Drechsler (1821–1897)	1 July 1870 or 5 August 1870	30 September 1879	Yes (as a Senatspräsident)	
2	Karl Hocheder (1825–1913)	1 March 1874	30 September 1879	Yes (as a Senatspräsident)	

=== Members (Reichsoberhandelsgerichtsräte) ===
No.	Name	Assumption of office	End of office	Transfer to the Reichsgericht	Ref.
1	Bernhard Friedrich Gustav Ponath (1812–1881)	1 July 1870 or 5 August 1870	30 September 1879 or 9 September 1879	No (retired)	
2	Wilhelm Albert Kosmann (1825–1875)	1 July 1870	1 April 1874	No (retired)	
3	Wilhelm Schmitz (1811–1875)	1 July 1870 or 5 August 1870	17 November 1875 (died)	No (died)	
4	Friedrich Gallenkamp (1818–1890)	1 July 1870 or 13 September 1870	30 September 1879	Yes (as a judge)	
5	Friedrich Moritz Hoffmann (1818–1882)	1 July 1870 or 5 August 1870	30 September 1879	Yes (as a judge)	
6	Gustav Ludwig August Fleischauer (1819–1891)	1 July 1870 or 5 August 1870	30 September 1879	Yes (as a judge)	
7	Adolph Schliemann (1817–1872)	1 July 1870	19 January 1872 (died)	No (died)	
8	Jeremias Theodor Boisselier (1826–1912)	1 July 1870 or 5 August 1870	30 September 1879	Yes (as a judge)	
9	Levin Goldschmidt (1829–1897)	1 July 1870 or 5 August 1870	31 August 1875	No (became a professor at the University of Berlin)	
10	Johann Friedrich Voigt (1804–1886)	1 July 1870 or 5 August 1870	30 September 1879	No (retired)	
11	Karl Julius August von Vangerow (1809–1898)	1 July 1870 or 5 August 1870	30 September 1879	Yes (as a judge)	
12	Karl Friedrich Werner (1820–1877)	1 July 1870 or 5 August 1870	31 August 1877 (died)	No (died)	
13	Marquard Adolph Barth (1809–1885)	1 August 1871	30 September 1879	No (retired)	
14	Johann Wernz (1819–1895)	1 August 1871	30 September 1879	Yes (as a judge)	
15	Ernst Sigismund Puchelt (1820–1885)	1 August 1871	30 September 1879	Yes (as a judge)	
16	Robert Römer (1823–1879)	1 August 1871	30 September 1879	No (retired)	
17	Friedrich von Hahn (1823–1897)	1 May 1872	30 September 1879	Yes (as a judge)	
18	Wilhelm Mohrmann (1815–1891)	1 January 1873	30 September 1879	No (retired)	
19	Wilhelm Langerhans (1816–1902)	1 March 1874 or 1 April 1874	30 September 1879	Yes (as a judge)	
20	Heinrich Wiener (1834–1897)	1 April 1874	30 September 1879	Yes (as a judge)	
21	Hermann Gustav Ludwig Theodor Krüger (1825–1903)	1 July 1874	30 September 1879	Yes (as a judge)	
22	Lothar Schilling (1832–1879)	1 April 1875	27 May 1879 (died)	No (died)	
23	Wilhelm Buff (1825–1900)	1 April 1875	30 September 1879	Yes (as a judge)	
24	Viktor von Meibom (1821–1892)	1 September 1875	30 September 1879	Yes (as a judge)	
25	Karl Heinrich Dreyer (1830–1900)	1 March 1876	30 September 1879	Yes (as a judge)	
26	Baum Hambrook (1818–1897)	1 September 1877	30 September 1879	Yes (as a judge)	
27	Hermann Wittmaack (1833–1928)	2 September 1877	30 September 1879	Yes (as a judge)	
28	Wilhelm Maßmann (1837–1916)	3 September 1877	30 September 1879	Yes (as a judge)	
29	August Hullmann (1826–1887)	1 January 1878	30 September 1879	Yes (as a judge)	
