= Handelsgesetzbuch =

HGB
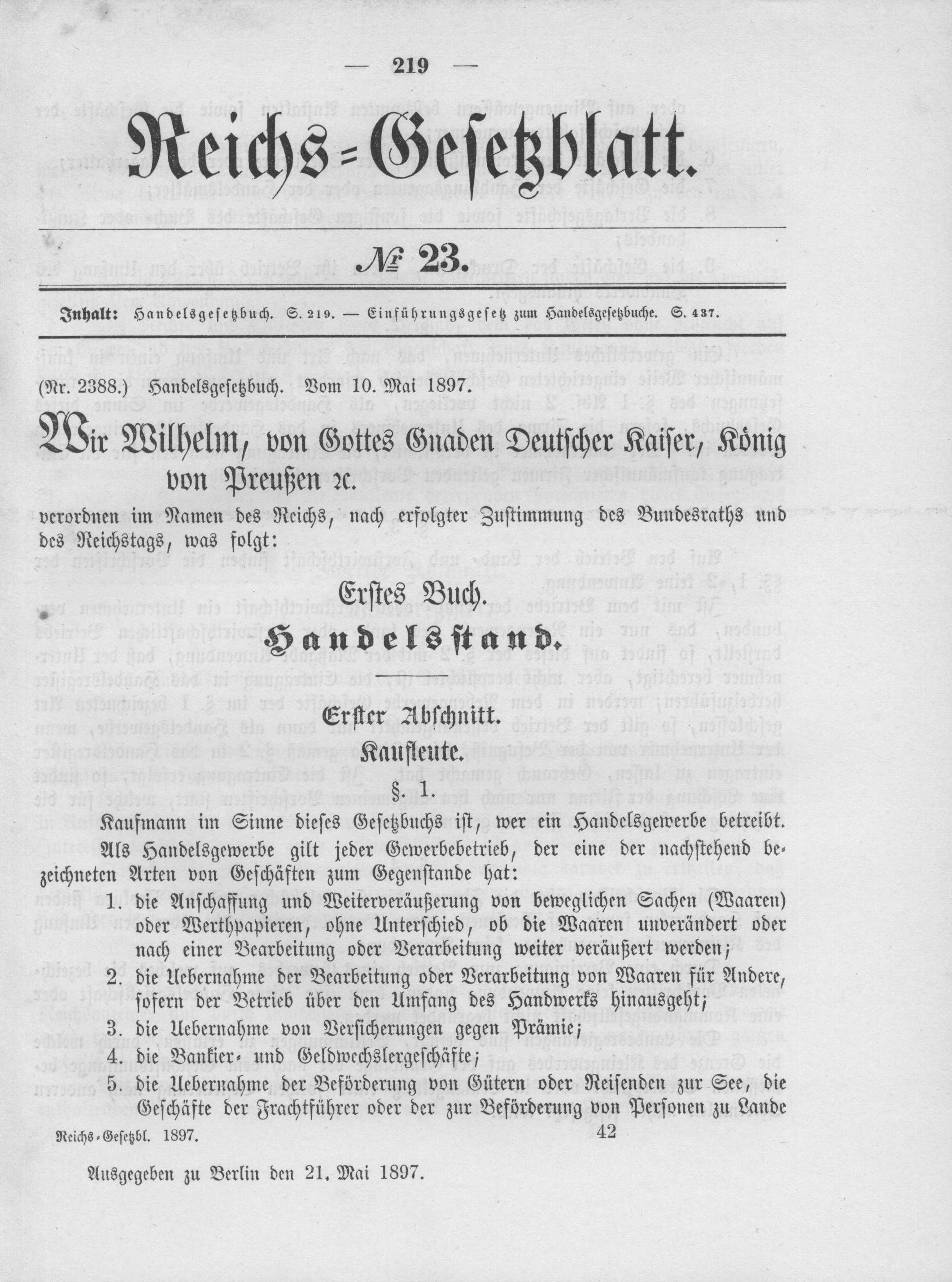
- Long title: Handelsgesetzbuch
- Citation: Law text (German); Book 5 Maritime Trade (English)
- Territorial extent: Federal Republic of Germany
- Passed: 10 May 1897
- Commenced: 1 January 1900

Summary
- Commercial Law

The Handelsgesetzbuch (HGB, in English Commercial Code) contains the core of the commercial law in Germany. It regulates the legal relations of merchants and therefore it is also designated as "the special private law for merchants".

The Bürgerliches Gesetzbuch (BGB) (English Civil Code) is only subsidiary applied to merchants beside the HGB. Beside that the HGB contains the regulations for the Offene Handelsgesellschaft (OHG) (English General partnership), the Kommanditgesellschaft (KG) (English Limited partnership) and the Stille Gesellschaft (stG) (English Dormant partnership).

HGB provides regulation to accounting for limited companies.

HGB also has a few penal provisions.

== History ==
Precursor of the Handelsgesetzbuch (HGB) was the Allgemeines Deutsches Handelsgesetzbuch (ADHGB) of 1861. ADHGB was replaced in the German Empire by the HGB, that was legislated on 10 May 1897. The HGB came into force together with the Bürgerliches Gesetzbuch (BGB) on 1 January 1900.

== Content ==
HGB also contains in the fifth Book the Maritime Trade Law (Seehandelsrecht). The HGB is arranged as follows

(table of contents):

1. Book: Merchant class (German Handelsstand) (§§ 1–104a)
  1. Merchants (German Kaufleute)
  2. Commercial register (German Handelsregister)
  3. Firm (German Handelsfirma)
  4. annulled
  5. Procuration and commercial power of attorney (German Prokura und Handlungsvollmacht)
  6. Merchant assistants and apprentices (German Handlungsgehilfen und Handlungslehrlinge)
  7. Commercial agent (German Handelsvertreter)
  8. Commercial brokers (German Handelsmakler)
  9. Fines (German Bußgeldvorschiften)
2. Book: Commercial partnership and dormant partnership (§§ 105–237)
  1. General partnership (German Offene Handelsgesellschaft)
  2. Limited partnership (German Kommandtitgesellschaft)
  3. Dormant partnership (German Stille Gesellschaft)
3. Book: Trading books (German Handelsbücher) (§§ 238–342e)
  1. Provisions for all merchants (German Vorschriften für alle Kaufleute)
  2. Supplementary provisions for limited companies (stock company, Limited partnership by shares and limited liability company) and certain commercial partnerships (German Ergänzende Vorschriften für Kapitalgesellschaften (Aktiengesellschaften, Kommanditgesellschaften auf Aktien und Gesellschaften mit beschränkter Haftung) sowie bestimmte Personenhandelsgesellschaften)
  3. Supplementary provisions for registered cooperatives (German Ergänzende Vorschriften für eingetragene Genossenschaften)
  4. Supplementary provisions for companies of certain business branches (German Ergänzende Vorschriften für Unternehmen bestimmter Geschäftszweige)
  5. Private rendering of accounts committee, Rendering of accounts advisory board (German Privates Rechnungslegungsgremium. Rechnungslegungsbeirat)
  6. Verifying authority for rendering of accounts (German Prüfstelle für Rechnungslegung)
4. Book: Commercial transaction (German Handelsgeschäfte) (§§ 343–475h)
  1. General Provisions (German Allgemeine Vorschriften)
  2. Commercial purchase (German Handelskauf)
  3. Commission business (German Kommissionsgeschäft)
  4. Freight business (German Frachtgeschäft)
  5. Forwarding agent business (German Speditionsgeschäft)
  6. Storage business (German Lagergeschäft)
5. Book: Maritime trade (German Seehandel) (§§ 476 ff.)
  1. Persons involved in shipping (German Personen der Schifffahrt)
  2. Transport contracts (German Beförderungsverträge)
  3. Charter contracts for ships (German Schiffsüberlassungsverträge)
  4. Ship’s emergencies (German Schiffsnotlagen)
  5. Maritime lienor (German Schiffsgläubiger)
  6. Statutory limitation period (German Verjährung)
  7. General limitation of liability (German Allgemeine Haftungsbeschränkung)
  8. Procedural Rules (German Verfahrensvorschriften)
