= The History of Commercial Partnerships in the Middle Ages =

The history of commercial partnerships in the Middle Ages
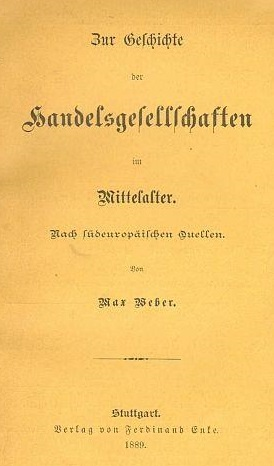
- First publication
- Author: Max Weber
- Language: German
- Publication date: 1889

Zur Geschichte der Handelgesellschaften im Mittelalter is a doctoral dissertation written in 1889 by Max Weber, a German economist and sociologist. The original edition was in German and the title is actually translated as The history of commercial partnerships in the Middle Ages.

Weber examined various legal principles according to the profit, risk and cost of an enterprise were carried by several individuals in the Middle Ages.
