= Ernst Karl Friedrich Wunderlich =

German philologist (1783–1816)

Ernst Karl Friedrich Wunderlich (1783 – 14 March 1816) was a German classical philologist born in Westerengel, a village near Trebra. He was the father of legal scholar Agathon Wunderlich (1810–1878).

He studied classical philology at the University of Göttingen, where in 1806 he earned his doctorate. In 1808 he was appointed assessor at the university, where shortly afterwards he became an associate professor. One of his better known students at Göttingen was philologist Karl Lachmann (1793–1851). Wunderlich died from acute angina when he was in his early thirties.

Among his better known literary works are the following:

- "Albii Tibulli Carmina libri tres cum quarto libro Sulpiciae et aliorum" (1806; revised posthumously in 1817 by Georg Ludolf Dissen 1784–1837).
- "Observationes critica in Aeschyli tragoedias tragoediarumque reliquias" (1809).
- "Demosthenis Oratio per corona, Aeschinis in Ctesiphontem" (1810, second edition 1820).
- "P. Vergilii Maronis opera in tironum" — completion of the Christian Gottlob Heyne (1729–1812) edition, posthumously released by Friedrich Ernst Ruhkopf (1760–1821) – Hanover/Leipzig 1816.
