= Thomas Wunderlich =

Austrian academic (born 1955)

Thomas Alexander Wunderlich (born 1 May 1955 in Vienna) is a Professor of Geodesy at the Technical University of Munich. He is a recipient of the Friedrich Hopfner-Medaille, the highest honor in Austria for geodesy.
