= Ernst Friedrich Kärcher =

German educator and philologist

Ernst Friedrich Kärcher (4 August 1789 – 12 April 1855) was a German educator and philologist born in Ichenheim, a village in Baden-Württemberg. He is remembered as an author of numerous Latin dictionaries.

He studied theology and classical languages at the University of Heidelberg, and subsequently worked for several years as a tutor. In 1815 he became a teacher at the Pädagogium in Durlach, and in 1820 was an instructor at the Lyceum Karlsruhe, where he taught classes until his death in 1855. In 1836 he was given the title of Oberstudienrath.

Kärcherstraße, a street in the Mühlburg district of Karlsruhe is named in his honor.

== Selected works ==
Among his better known publications are the following:

- Schulwörterbuch der lateinischen Sprache in etymologischer Ordnung (School dictionary of the Latin language in etymological order); 1824, 2nd edition- 1826.
- Kleines deutsch-lateinisches Wörterbuch für Anfänger (Small German-Latin dictionary for beginners), 1824.
- De Optima Latini Lexici Condendi Ratione, 1826.
- Lateinisch-deutsches und deutsch-lateinisches Schulwörterbuch (Latin-German and German-Latin school dictionary), 1826.
- Ad sollemnia divi Caroli Friderici saecularia, 1828.
- Kleineres Wörterbuch der lateinischen Sprache in etymologischer Ordnung (Smaller dictionary of the Latin language in etymological order), 1831.
- Über die Einrichtung eines etymologischen Schulwörterbuchs der französischen Sprache, für die Gelehrtenschulen (On the establishment of a school etymological dictionary of the French language), 1838
- Deutsch-lateinisches Wörterbuch für Gymnasien (German-Latin dictionary for high schools), 1840.
- Handwörterbuch der lateinischen Sprache (Hand dictionary of the Latin language), 1842.
- Das obsolete Zeitwort Quio und seine Familie, 1842.
- Nachträge zu Forcellini's lateinischem Lexicon (Addenda to Forcellini's Latin lexicon), 1854.
- Reden, bei der Feier des vierzigjährigen Dienstjubiläums des Herrn Geh. Hofraths und Lyceums-Directors Dr. E. Kärcher gehalten 1855.
