= Agathon Wunderlich =

German jurist (1810–1878)

Gottlob Friedrich Walter Agathon Wunderlich (12 March 1810 – 21 November 1878) was a German jurist and a member of the Oberappellationsgericht der vier Freien Städte (an upper appellate court).

== History ==
Wunderlich was the son of philologist Ernst Karl Friedrich Wunderlich (1783–1816). Although he was not a Prussian citizen, he was awarded a scholarship to study at the prestigious Landesschule Pforta (1824–28). Afterwards he studied at the University of Göttingen, obtaining his law degree in 1832. In 1833 he received his habilitation and began serving as an Hanoverian civil servant. Due to the repeal of the Hanoverian state constitution by King Ernest Augustus and associated dismissal of the Göttingen Seven (1837), Wunderlich moved to Berlin to acquire "Prussian habilitation".

Through assistance from Johann Jakob Bachofen (1815–1877), he attained the chair of Roman law at the University of Basel in 1838. In Basel he published works on medieval Verfahrensrechtler (procedural law). In 1842 he became a professor at the University of Rostock, followed by a professorship at the University of Halle (1847). In 1850 he was appointed as a judge of the Oberappellationsgericht der vier Freien Städte (High Court of Appeal of the four Free Cities) in Lübeck.

== Writings ==
- De antiqua litterarum obligatio, dissertation. Göttingen 1832
- Andreae Joannis de Summula processu iudicii / ex cod. Basil. in integrum restituit. Schweighauser, Basel 1840
- Anecdota quae spectant processum civilem. Vandenhoeck & Ruprecht, Göttingen 1841
- Tancredi Summa de Matrimonio. Vandenhoeck & Ruprecht, Göttingen 1841
- Rechtssprüche und Gutachten der Juristen-Facultät zu Rostock (Legal decisions and opinions of the lawyers, faculty of Rostock). Reimer, Berlin 1846
- Edition of George Arnold Heise's Handelsrecht (Commercial law); Frankfurt 1858
- Bibliotheca Wunderlich: Altera editio. Halle/Saale 1858
- Die Jurisprudenz des Oberappellations-Gerichts der vier freien Städte Deutschlands in bürgerlichen Rechtssachen aus Lübeck 1848-64 (The jurisprudence of the Supreme Court of Appeals of the four free cities of Germany in civil cases from Lübeck 1848–64). two volumes, Gesenius, Bremen 1866.
