= Districts and neighbourhoods of Dalfsen =

The Dutch municipality Dalfsen is divided into districts and neighbourhoods for statistical purposes. The municipality is divided into the following statistical districts:

- District 00 Dalfsen (kern) (CBS-neighbourhood code:014800)
- District 01 Dalfsen - buitengebied (CBS-neighbourhood code:014801)
- District 02 Oudleusen (CBS-neighbourhood code:014802)
- District 03 Hoonhorst (CBS-neighbourhood code:014803)
- District 04 Lenthe-2 (CBS-neighbourhood code:014804)
- District 05 Kluinhaar (CBS-neighbourhood code:014805)
- District 06 Lemelerveld (CBS-neighbourhood code:014806)
- District 07 Leusenerveld (CBS-neighbourhood code:014807)

A statistical district may consist of several neighbourhoods. The table below shows the neighbourhood division with characteristic values according to the Statistics Netherlands (CBS, 2008):

CBS-neighbourhood code	Neighbourhood name	Population	Area total (ha)	Area land (ha)	Position
BU01480000	Dalfsen-Kom	450	20	18	Location in the municipality
BU01480001	Dalfsen-Vechtvliet	370	38	35	Location in the municipality
BU01480002	Dalfsen-Rondweg	280	60	57	Location in the municipality
BU01480003	Dalfsen-Pleijendal	1320	27	27	Location in the municipality
BU01480004	Dalfsen-Leemcule	470	22	22	Location in the municipality
BU01480005	Dalfsen-Polhaar-Oost	1300	27	27	Location in the municipality
BU01480006	Dalfsen-Polhaar-West	1080	24	24	Location in the municipality
BU01480007	Dalfsen-Ankummer-Es I	1120	23	23	Location in the municipality
BU01480008	Dalfsen-Ankummer-Es II	1320	27	27	Location in the municipality
BU01480100	Ankum-Kern	100	8	8	Location in the municipality
BU01480104	Verspreide huizen Ankum	620	1008	995	Location in the municipality
BU01480105	Verspreide huizen Dalfserveld	350	1577	1577	Location in the municipality
BU01480106	Verspreide huizen Gerner-Welsum	910	630	620	Location in the municipality
BU01480107	Verspreide huizen Rechteren-Hessum	450	1447	1433	Location in the municipality
BU01480108	Verspreide huizen Milligen	240	1285	1274	Location in the municipality
BU01480109	Verspreide huizen Emmen-De Marshoek	380	1095	1069	Location in the municipality
BU01480200	Oudleusen kern	400	15	15	Location in the municipality
BU01480209	Verspreide huizen Oudleusenerveld	810	1347	1337	Location in the municipality
BU01480300	Hoonhorst kern	620	44	44	Location in the municipality
BU01480309	Verspreide huizen Lenthe	480	992	990	Location in the municipality
BU01480409	Verspreide huizen Lenthe-2	80	199	196	Location in the municipality
BU01480509	Verspreide huizen Kluinhaar	0	112	110	Location in the municipality
BU01480600	Lemelerveld kern	3140	200	195	Location in the municipality
BU01480606	Miga, 't Zwarte, Koelen, Schanebroek 1	330	542	540	Location in the municipality
BU01480607	Schanebroek 2 en Wolthaarshoek	160	295	293	Location in the municipality
BU01480608	Verspreide huizen Strenkhaar	430	622	619	Location in the municipality
BU01480609	Verspreide huizen Dalmsholte	470	1186	1179	Location in the municipality
BU01480700	Nieuwleusen-Zuid	2790	251	251	Location in the municipality
BU01480701	Nieuwleusen-Noord	3060	181	171	Location in the municipality
BU01480705	Verspreide huizen Nieuwleusen-Zuid (gedeeltelijk)	1150	516	514	Location in the municipality
BU01480706	Verspreide huizen Nieuwleusen-Noord (gedeeltelijk)	440	398	397	Location in the municipality
BU01480707	Verspreide huizen Ruitenveen	490	819	818	Location in the municipality
BU01480708	Verspreide huizen De Meele	620	634	628	Location in the municipality
BU01480709	Veenekampen-De Ruiten	490	982	981	Location in the municipality
