= Broekhuizen =

Broekhuizen may refer to:

- Broekhuizen, Limburg in Horst aan de Maas
- Broekhuizen, Drenthe, a hamlet near Meppel
- Broekhuizen, South Holland, a hamlet near Gouda
- Broekhuizen, Overijssel, a hamlet near Dalfsen
- Broekhuizen (surname), a Dutch toponymic surname referring to one of the above
