= Amazonis =

Amazonis may refer to:

- Amazonis Planitia, a plain on Mars
- Amazonis quadrangle, a cartographic quadrangles of Mars
- Amazonis, lost Latin epic by Domitius Marsus
