= Broekhuizen (surname) =

Broekhuizen is a Dutch toponymic surname referring to any of a number of places in the Low Countries named Broekhuizen or Broekhuysen. Among variant forms are Broeckhuys, Broekhuis, Broekhuijse and Broekhuijsen. People with this name include:

- Henk Broekhuis, pseudonym of Karel van het Reve (1921–1999), Dutch writer, translator and literary historian
- Jan Broekhuijse (1929–2020), Dutch anthropologist
- Joan van Broekhuizen (1649–1707), Dutch classical scholar and poet
- Joe Broekhuizen (born 1991), American soccer player
- Nico Broekhuysen (1876–1958), Dutch teacher, inventor of korfball
- Wilfried Brookhuis (born 1961), Dutch football goalkeeper
