= Tibullus =

Roman poet and writer of elegies (c. 55–c. 19 BC)

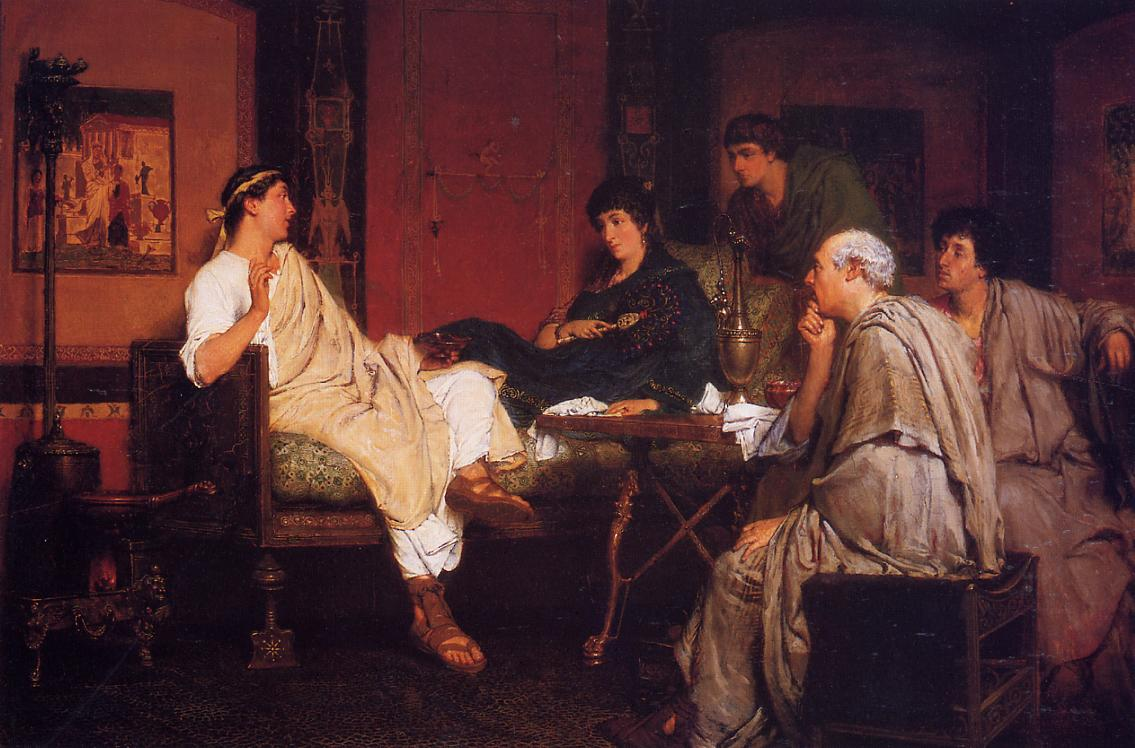
Lawrence Alma-Tadema, Tibullus at Delia's

Albius Tibullus (c. 55 BC – c. 19 BC) was a Latin poet and writer of elegies. His first and second books of poetry are extant; many other texts attributed to him are of questionable origins.

Little is known about the life of Tibullus. There are only a few references to him by later writers and a short Life of doubtful authority. Neither his praenomen nor his birthplace is known, and his gentile name has been questioned. His status was probably that of a Roman eques (so the Life affirms), and he had inherited a considerable estate. Like Virgil and Propertius, he seems to have lost most of it in 41 BC in the confiscations of Mark Antony and Octavian.

== Life ==
Tibullus's chief friend and patron was Marcus Valerius Messalla Corvinus, himself an orator and poet as well as a statesman and a commander. Messalla, like Gaius Maecenas, was at the centre of a literary circle in Rome. This circle had no relationship with the court, and the name of Augustus is found nowhere in the writings of Tibullus. About 30 BC Messalla was dispatched by Augustus to Gaul to quell a rising in Aquitania and restore order in the country, and Tibullus may have been in his retinue. On a later occasion, probably in 28, he would have accompanied his friend who had been sent on a mission to the East, but he fell sick and had to stay behind in Corcyra. Tibullus had no liking for war, and though his life seems to have been divided between Rome and his country estate, his own preferences were wholly for the country life.

The loss of Tibullus's landed property is attested by himself (i.1, 19), as a farmer felicis quondam, nunc pauperis agri ("of a once fruitful, now impoverished field"; cf. 41, 42). Its cause is only an inference, though a very probable one. That he was allowed to retain a portion of his estate with the family mansion is clear from ii.4, 53. Tibullus may have been Messalla's contubernalis in the Aquitanian War (Vita Tib. and Tib. i.7, 9 seq., a poem composed for Messalla's triumph), and may have received dona militaria (Vita Tib.).

Tibullus died prematurely, probably in 19, around the same time as Virgil or not long afterwards. His death made a deep impression in Rome, as is clear from his contemporary, Domitius Marsus, and from the elegy in which Ovid enshrined the memory of his predecessor.

== Horace and Tibullus ==
Two short poems by Horace, addressed to a certain Albius (Odes 1.33 and Epistles 1.4), are believed to refer to Tibullus. In the first of these poems Horace advises Albius not to be excessive in singing sad elegies in memory of the cruel "Glycera" (assumed to be the same as Nemesis).

In the second poem, Horace imagines Albius, when he receives the letter, either writing poetry or wandering in the woods near Pedum. He goes on: "You were not (born as) a body without a heart; the gods gave you beauty, riches, and the art of enjoying them. What more could a nurse wish for in her charge than that he should be intelligent, able to speak what he feels, and have style, fame, and health in abundance?" Horace advises his friend, whatever hopes and fears and angers he has, to live each day as if it was his last. At the end he makes a joke to cheer his friend up, comparing himself to a "pig from Epicurus's herd".

Although J. P. Postgate challenged the identification of Albius with Tibullus, more recent scholars such as Ullman, Putnam, and Ball have argued that they are the same. In Putnam's analysis, Tibullus, in Horace's view, is too much given to self-pity, and would benefit from taking a more philosophical view of life's foibles.

The first book of Horace's Odes was published in 23 BC, and the first book of the Epistles in 20 BC, making the time-frame plausible, if Albius is Tibullus.

== First book of poetry ==
Tibullus's first book consists of poems written at various times between 30 and 26. His first love, the subject of book i., is called Delia in the poems, but Apuleius reveals that her real name was Plania. It appears that she was not entitled to wear the stola, the dress of Roman matrons (i. 6, 68), and so was doubtless a courtesan. Her husband is mentioned as absent (i. 2, 67 seq.). She eludes the guards placed over her (i. 2, 15 and 6, 7). Tibullus's suit was favoured by Delia's mother, of whom he speaks in very affectionate terms (i. 6, 57 seq.). For Tibullus's illness at Corcyra, see i. 3, I seq., 55 seq. The fifth elegy was written during an estrangement (discidium), and the sixth after the return of the husband and during Delia's double infidelity. It is impossible to give an exact account of the intimacy. The poems which refer to her are arranged in no chronological order. Sometimes she appears as single, sometimes as married; but we hear nothing either of her marriage or of her husband's death. Yet it is clear that it was the absence of her husband on military service in Cilicia which gave Tibullus the opportunity to see her, and he continued to do so when the husband returned. Delia was clever in deception — too clever, as Tibullus saw when he found that he was not the only lover. His entreaties and appeals were of no avail; and after the first book no more is heard of Delia.

=== The Marathus cycle ===
In addition, three elegies in Book I (1.4, 1.8, and 1.9) concern themselves with Tibullus's love for a boy, who is named Marathus. The three poems constitute the longest poetic project in Roman literature having homosexual love as theme. The first of these poems, 1.4, begins with an imprecation of the poet to the god Priapus, asking for advice on how to win over beautiful boys. The god advises patience and that the man in love yield to the beloved boy's every whim and perform a series of services if the boy demands it (1.4.15–53). At first the narrator of the poem presents himself as someone who is simply asking for advice from the god on behalf of a friend Titius who has fallen in love with a boy but whose wife forbids such affairs (1.4.73). He later portrays himself as a teacher in the affairs of love, declaring that the doors of his house are open for other men in love with boys to ask his advice (1.4.78). In the last four lines, however, he confesses to loving a boy named Marathus, who tortures him with "love's delay" (1.4.81) and whom the narrator cannot conquer with his arts, causing other men to laugh at his lessons (1.4.83).

The cycle is resumed in poem 1.8, in which the narrator learns that Marathus is in love with a girl. The narrator advises the girl to treat Marathus with more leniency than Marathus treated the narrator himself (1.8.49). The narrator accompanies Marathus to the girl's house, carrying a torch to light the path at night, bribes her so that she meets Marathus, and talks the boy up to the girl (this is described in more detail the next poem, 1.9, lines 41–44). This poem can be seen as part of the narrator's efforts to win Marathus' goodwill by performing a series of humiliating tasks for him, exceeding the god's counsel to perform hard physical labors for the lad, by also helping him carry on an affair with someone else.

In the poem that ends the cycle, 1.9, Marathus is not named, but it is usually assumed that it is about the same boy. In this poem the narrator reveals that Marathus is in a relationship with a much older married man who buys the young man's affections through expensive gifts. Initially, the narrator asks the gods for compassion towards Marathus (1.9.5–6), who betrayed a promise he had made to the narrator, but soon love yields to bitterness, and he begins to express the desire that the gifts of the rival lover turn to ashes (1.9.11–12) and that the same happen to the poems that the narrator wrote to Marathus to win him over (1.9.48–49), of which he is now ashamed. He turns to the rival, taking revenge on him for having stolen his boyfriend by taunting him with the affair that the rival's wife is herself having with another young man (1.9.54–58 and 65–74). Finally, the poet addresses the boy himself, telling him that he will cry when he sees the poet fall in love with another capricious lad (1.9.79–80), but declaring himself, for the time being, finally released from unfaithful love.

== Second book of poetry ==
About the second book, scholars can only say that in all likelihood it was published before the poet's death in 19 BC. It is very short, containing only 6 poems (428 verses), but apparently complete.

The first poem, of 90 lines, describes an idealised life in the country; the second, of 22 lines, celebrates the birthday of a certain Cornutus. The fifth poem is a hymn to Apollo celebrating the installation of Messalla's son as one of the fifteen priests who were guardians of the Sibylline Books (the Quindecimviri sacris faciundis).

In poems 3–6 of the second book the place of Delia is taken by "Nemesis", which is also a fictitious name. Nemesis (like the Cynthia of Propertius) was probably a courtesan of the higher class; and she had other admirers besides Tibullus. He complains bitterly of his bondage, and of her rapacity and hard-heartedness. In spite of all, however, she seems to have retained her hold on him until his death.

Ovid, writing at the time of Tibullus's death, says: "Sic Nemesis longum, sic Delia nomen habebunt, / altera cura recens, altera primus amor" ("Thus Nemesis and Delia will be long remembered: one Tibullus' recent love, the other his first"). Nemesis is the subject of the last four poems of book 2. The connection had lasted a year when 2.5 was written (see ver. 109). It is worth noticing that Martial selects Nemesis as the source of Tibullus's reputation.

== Third book of poetry ==
The third book of the collection contains a miscellaneous collection of poems, and most scholars today believe that none of them are by Tibullus (even though one of them 3.19, seems to claim Tibullus as author). Sometime in the 15th century the book was split into two parts, so that poems 3.8 to 3.20 are sometimes referred to as 4.1 to 4.14.

=== Lygdamus elegies ===
The third book opens with a set of six poems in elegiac couplets (290 verses) by a poet who calls himself "Lygdamus", all but the fifth celebrating his love for a woman called Neaera, whom he describes as "unfaithful, but all the same beloved" (3.6.56). In one line (3.5.18) he gives his own birthdate as the equivalent of 43 BC, using the same words as Ovid used in Tristia 4.10.6 to describe his own birthdate ("the year when both consuls fell by equal fate"). There are a number of other similarities between Lygdamus and Ovid, which are examined in an article by A. G. Lee. Lee comes to the conclusion that Lygdamus must have copied Ovid, not the reverse, and that his date may have been in the late 1st century AD. F. Navarro Antolín comes to the same conclusion, citing among other reasons certain words that were not generally used in poetry of the time of Tibullus.

Other scholars, however, noting the great overlap in vocabulary and stylistic features between Lygdamus and Ovid, have argued that the Lygdamus poems were written anonymously by the youthful Ovid himself.

Unlike Tibullus's Delia and Nemesis, or Propertius's Cynthia, Lygdamus's Neaera appears not to have been a prostitute but is described as Lygdamus's "wife" (coniunx) with respectable parents whom the poet knows. Radford and others take this as representing the situation of Ovid himself, whose second wife apparently divorced him.

According to one theory, the six poems of Lygdamus were originally added by booksellers to book 2, to make up the very short length of that book, and only later transferred to book 3. This would have made book 1 and 2 of almost equal length (820 lines + 718 lines).

=== Panegyricus Messallae ===
Poem 3.7, unlike all the other poems in the Tibullan collection, is written in dactylic hexameters. It is a panegyric of Messalla (consul 31 BC), 212 lines long. There is no indication of the author, although, like Tibullus (1.1.41–43), the author complains that his family was once very wealthy but that their estate has been reduced to a small farm (3.7.181–191). It is thought by some scholars that the poem itself was probably written in 31, the year of Messalla's consulship, or soon afterwards. Other scholars, however, view it as a pseudepigraphical work written many years later.

Although many scholars have criticised the style of the poem, it has also been called "brilliant, though excessively rhetorical". Among its features are two long digressions, one (lines 48–81) detailing all the wanderings of Ulysses (Odysseus) up to his arrival on the island of Phaeacia, and the other (lines 151–176) describing the five climatic zones of the world. F. S. Bright demonstrates how these two digressions are in fact related and how both have relevance to Messalla.

=== Garland of Sulpicia ===
There follow five short elegiac poems (94 lines in all) concerning the love of Sulpicia for a certain Cerinthus. These are often known as the Garland of Sulpicia or the Cerinthus–Sulpicia cycle. Three of them (3.8, 3.10, 3.12) are composed in the voice of the poet; the other two (3.9 and 3.11) are replies by Sulpicia. The style of all them is similar and most scholars believe they are the work of a single author. Some scholars attribute them to Tibullus himself; but the validity of this attribution is uncertain. Cerinthus is thought to be a pseudonym, and is sometimes identified with Tibullus's friend Cornutus, who is addressed in 2.2.

=== Sulpicia epigrams ===
The next group (3.13–3.18) is a set of six very short elegiac poems (40 lines in all) apparently written to or about Cerinthus by Sulpicia herself. The style of these is markedly different from the preceding group of poems. Her syntax has been described as "convoluted" and in some parts (e.g. 3.16) the meaning is not clear. Although there are some dissenting voices, most scholars accept that these six poems are genuinely written by a female poet, Sulpicia, the only Roman female poet whose work has survived. Their frank and passionate outpourings are reminiscent of Catullus. The style and metrical handling was originally understood to be that of a novice, or a male poet appropriating female form. Later analysis has concluded that Sulpicia is an adept poet with a very high level of skill, playing upon gender norms in the celebration of her erotic relationship and play upon her fama as a poet and a woman of high status.

=== Poem 3.19 ===
Poem 3.19 (24 lines) claims to be by Tibullus, but its authorship has been doubted. Radford (1923) believed it to be by Ovid, calling it an "exquisite 'imitation' of Tibullus which has itself been imitated and admired by so many English poets." However, in a recent assessment of the poem, Stephen Heyworth (2021) believes that Tibullan authorship cannot be ruled out, and that it may even be a fragment from the lost ending of book 2.

In this poem the poet promises his (unnamed) girlfriend that no other girl will ever take her place. He swears this by Juno, the goddess he reveres most. He will never cease to be a slave at the altar of Venus, the goddess of love.

The poem appears twice in the main manuscript, the 14th-century Ambrosianus, once after 3.6 and again after 3.18.

=== Poem 3.20 ===
3.20 is a four-line epigram with nothing to determine its authorship. It complains about a rumour that the author's girlfriend has been unfaithful, but he tells the rumour to be quiet. The word tacē! "be quiet!" appropriately brings the collection of poems to a close.

=== Epitaph ===
At the end of the book comes the epigram of the poet Domitius Marsus, a contemporary of Tibullus, commemorating the fact that both Tibullus and Virgil died about the same time (19 BC), Tibullus being only a young man at the time.

To sum up: the third and fourth books appear in the oldest tradition as a single book, and they comprise pieces by different authors in different styles, none of which can be assigned to Tibullus with any certainty. The natural conclusion is that a collection of scattered compositions, relating to Messalla and the members of his circle, was added as an appendix to the genuine relics of Tibullus. When this "Messalla collection" was made cannot be exactly determined; but it was definitely not till after the death of Tibullus, 19 BC, and perhaps as late as the late 1st century AD. Besides the foregoing, two pieces in the collection called Priapea (one an epigram and the other a longer piece in iambics) have been attributed to Tibullus; but there is little external and no internal evidence of his authorship.

== Style of writing ==
Though the character of Tibullus the historical man is unclear, the character of his poetic persona is reflected in his works. In Postgate's view, he was an amiable man of generous impulses and unselfish disposition, loyal to his friends to the verge of self-sacrifice (as is shown by his leaving Delia to accompany Messalla to Asia), and apparently constant to his mistresses. His tenderness towards them is enhanced by a refinement and delicacy which are rare among the ancients. When treated cruelly by his love, he does not invoke curses upon her head. Instead he goes to her little sister's grave, hung so often with his garlands and wet with his tears, to bemoan his fate. His ideal is a quiet retirement in the country with the loved one at his side. He has no ambition and not even a poet's yearning for immortality. In an age of crude materialism and gross superstition, he was religious in the old Roman way. His clear, finished and yet unaffected style made him a great favourite and placed him, in the judgment of Quintilian, ahead of other elegiac writers. For natural grace and tenderness, for exquisiteness of feeling and expression, he stands alone. He rarely overloads his lines with Alexandrian learning. However, his range is limited. Tibullus is smoother and more musical, but liable to become monotonous; Propertius, with occasional harshnesses, is more vigorous and varied. In many of Tibullus's poems a symmetrical composition can be traced.

== The Vita Tibulli ==
A short Vita Tibulli (Life of Tibullus) is found at the end of the Ambrosian, Vatican and inferior manuscripts. It has been much discussed. There is little in it that cannot be inferred from Tibullus himself and from what Horace says about Albius, though it is possible that its compiler may have taken some of his statements from Suetonius's book De Poetis.

== Manuscripts ==
The best manuscript of Tibullus is the Ambrosianus (A), which has been dated c. 1375, whose earliest known owner was the humanist Coluccio Salutati. Two early 15th-century manuscripts are Paris lat. 7989 (written in Florence in 1423) and the Vatican MS. Ottob. lat. 1202 (also written in Florence, 1426). These form only a small share of the over 100 Renaissance manuscripts. There are also a number of extracts from Tibullus in Florilegium Gallicum, an anthology from various Latin writers collected in the mid-twelfth century, and a few extracts in the Excerpta frisingensia, preserved in a manuscript now at Munich. Also excerpts from the lost Fragmentum cuiacianum, made by Scaliger, and now in the library at Leiden are of importance for their independence of A. It contained the part from 3.4.65 to the end, useful as fragments go as the other manuscripts lack 3.4.65. The Codex cuiacianus, a late manuscript containing the works of Catullus, Tibullus and Propertius, is still extant.

== Editions ==
Tibullus was first printed with Catullus, Propertius, and the Silvae of Statius by Vindelinus de Spira (Venice, 1472), and separately by Florentius de Argentina, probably in the same year. Amongst other editions are those by Scaliger (with Catullus and Propertius, 1577, etc.), Broukhusius (1708), Vulpius (1749), Heyne (1817, 4th ed. by Wunderlich, with supplement by Dissen, 1819), Huschke (1819), Lachmann (1829), Dissen (1835), Lucian Müller (1870), Emil Baehrens (1878), Heinrich Dittrich (1881), Edward Hiller (1885) and John Percival Postgate (1905).

Among more recent commentaries are those by Kirby Flower Smith (1913), Paul Murgatroyd (1980/1994), and Robert Maltby (2002/2021). Guy Lee's edition and translation of books 1–2 (Cambridge, 1975) is based on a fresh collation of A.

== Critiques ==
Francis Cairns regards Tibullus as "a good poet but not a great one"; Dorothea Wender similarly calls him a minor poet but argues there is "grace and polish and symmetry" to his work.
