= Hoonhorst =

- Village
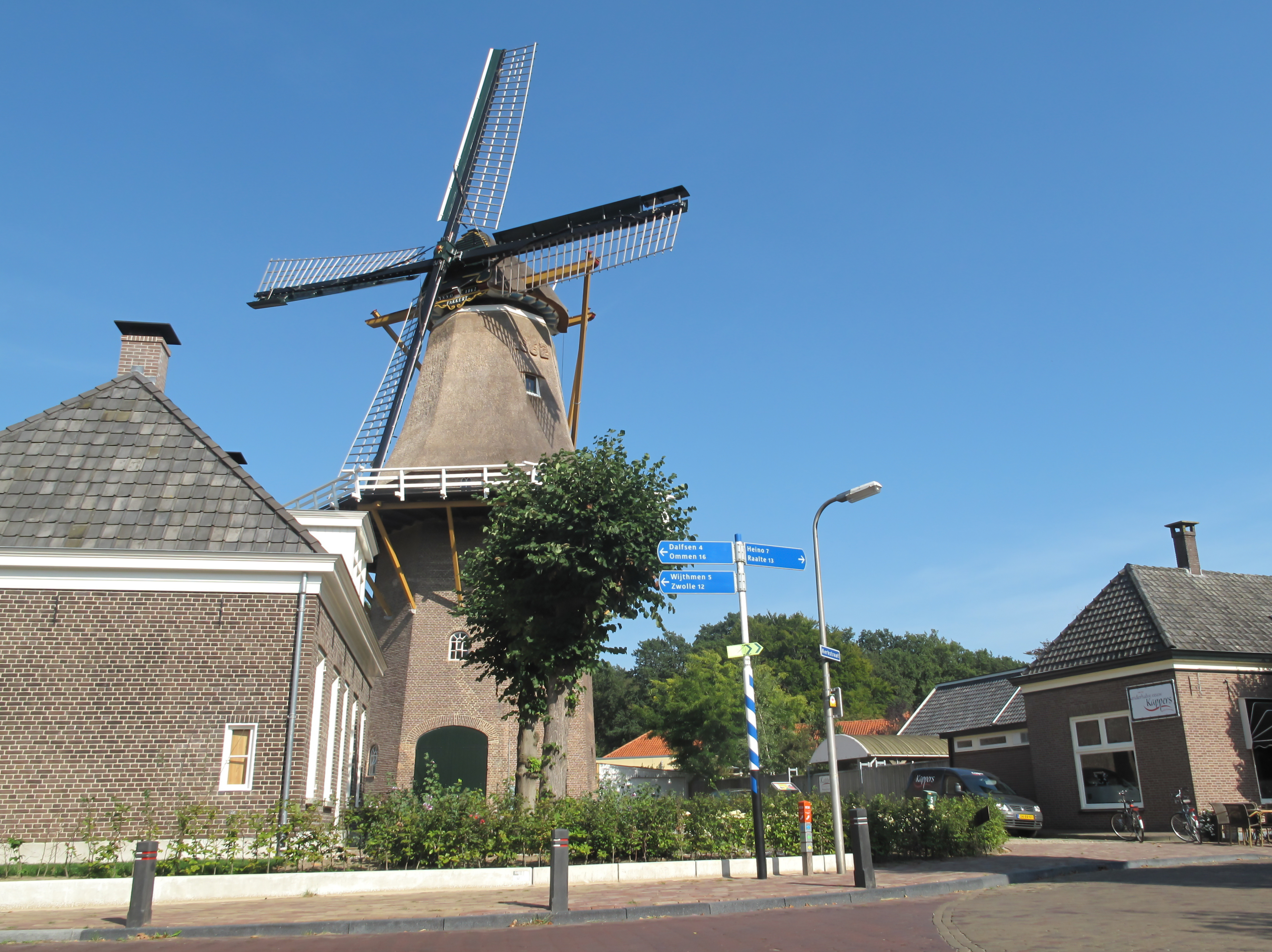
- Windmill De Fakkert in Hoonhorst

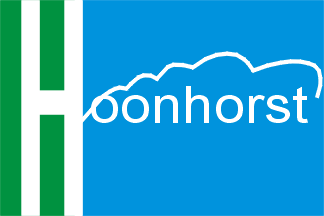
- Flag

- Location in province of Overijssel in the Netherlands Hoonhorst (Netherlands)
- Coordinates: 52.48563°N 6.22745°E
- Country: Netherlands
- Province: Overijssel
- Municipality: Dalfsen

Area
  - Total: 0.79 km^{2} (0.31 sq mi)
- Elevation: 3 m (9.8 ft)

Population (2021)
  - Total: 720
  - Density: 910/km^{2} (2,400/sq mi)
- Time zone: UTC+1 (CET)
  - Summer (DST): UTC+2 (CEST)
- Postal code: 7722
- Dialing code: 0529

Hoonhorst is a village in the municipality of Dalfsen in the province of Overijssel, Netherlands. It is a Catholic enclave in a Protestant area. It located about 9 kilometres (5.6 mi) east of Zwolle.

== History ==
The village was first mentioned in 1283 as "de Honhorst", and means "height with growth". Hoonhorst developed to the south-west of Dalfsen as a Catholic centre. In 1581, the Catholic faith was outlawed in Overijssel. In 1770, the drost (chief magistrate) of Salland was petitioned to allow the construction of a Catholic church. Permission was granted to build a church in Hoonhorst as long as it looked like a farm on the outside.

In 1770, a Catholic church was built in Hoonhorst, and dedicated to Cyriacus. Hoornhorst would still remain a hamlet, and was home to 28 people in the 1795 census. Freedom of religion was restored during the French period (1794-1815). In 1853, the Archdiocese of Utrecht intended to demolish the church, and construct churches in Dalfsen and Heino instead, however the congregation persuaded the bishop to build a new church. In 1858, a real church was built which in turn was replaced in 1964.

The grist mill De Fakkert was built in 1862, but burnt down on 13 July 1868. It was rebuilt, and in 1926 an engine was installed. In 1930, the gallery collapsed during repairs injuring two people. The damage was not repaired, and only the hull remained. Between 2011 and 2012, the wind mill was rebuilt and is in frequent service.

During the 20th century, Hoonhorst started to grow and develop into a village. Since 1977, carnaval is celebrated in the village.

== Gallery ==
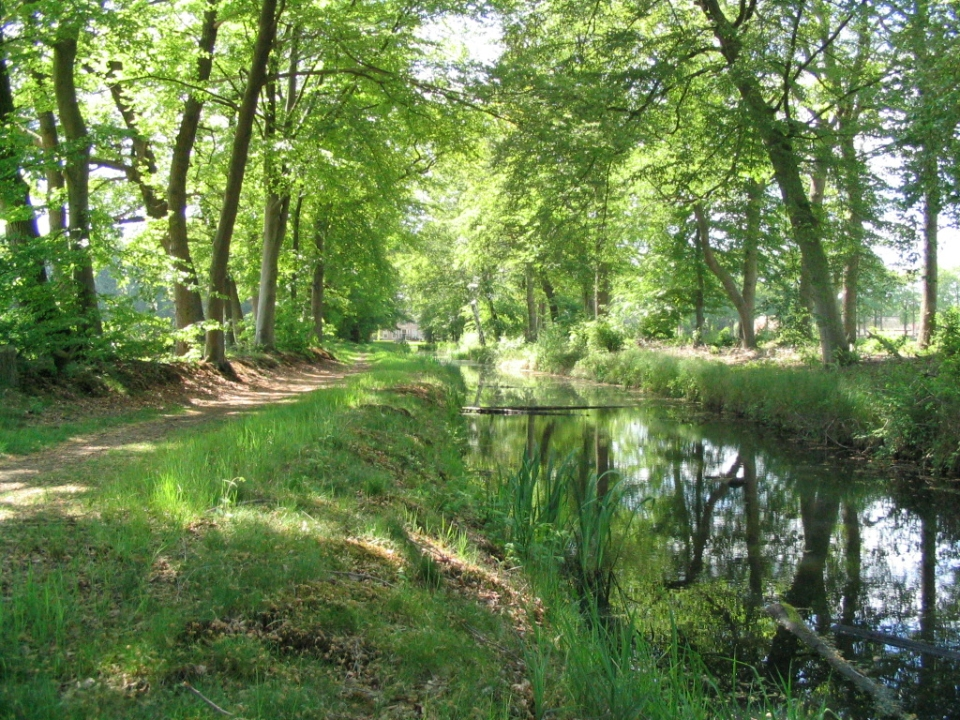
Landscape near Hoonhorst

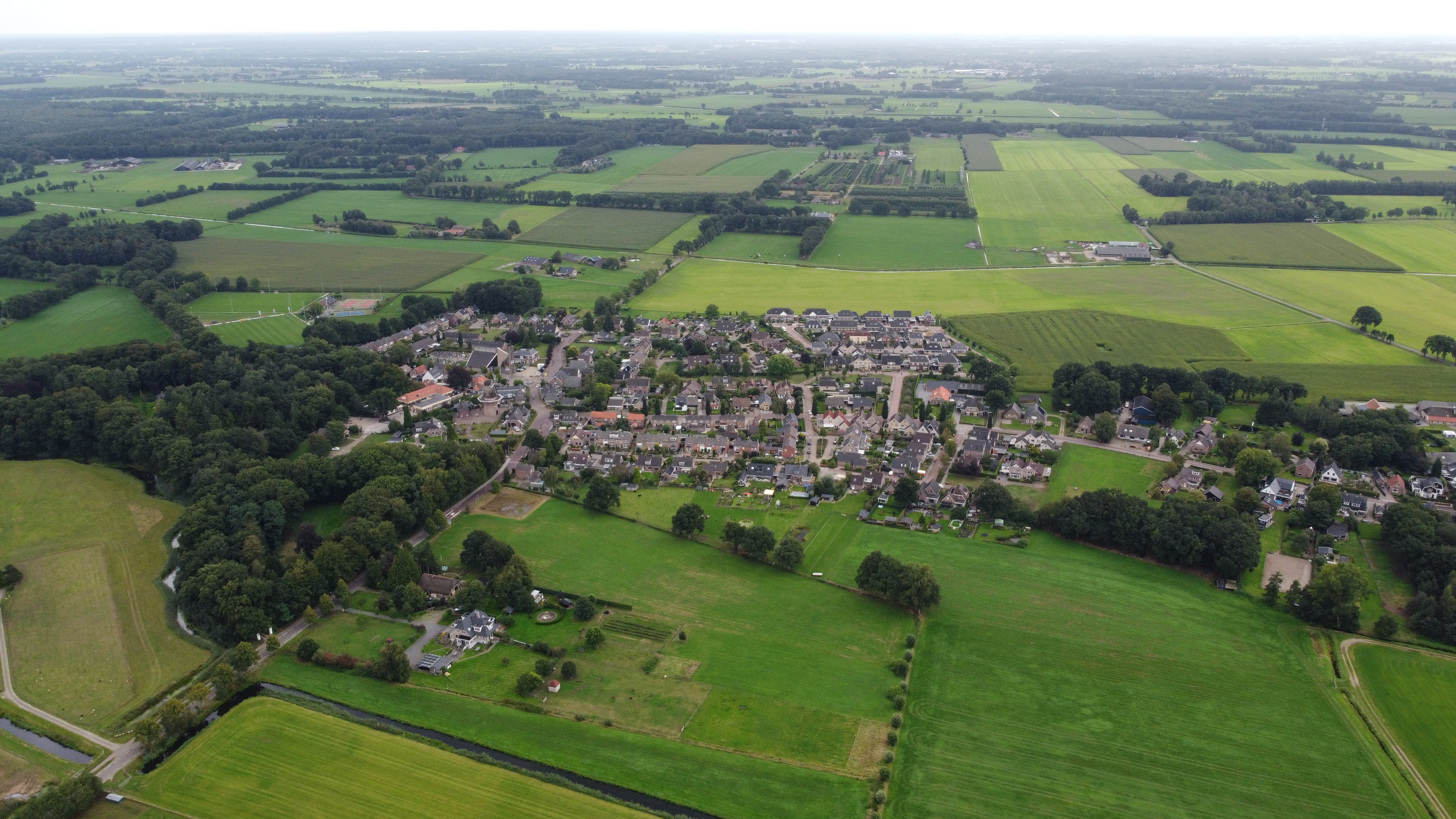
Aerial view

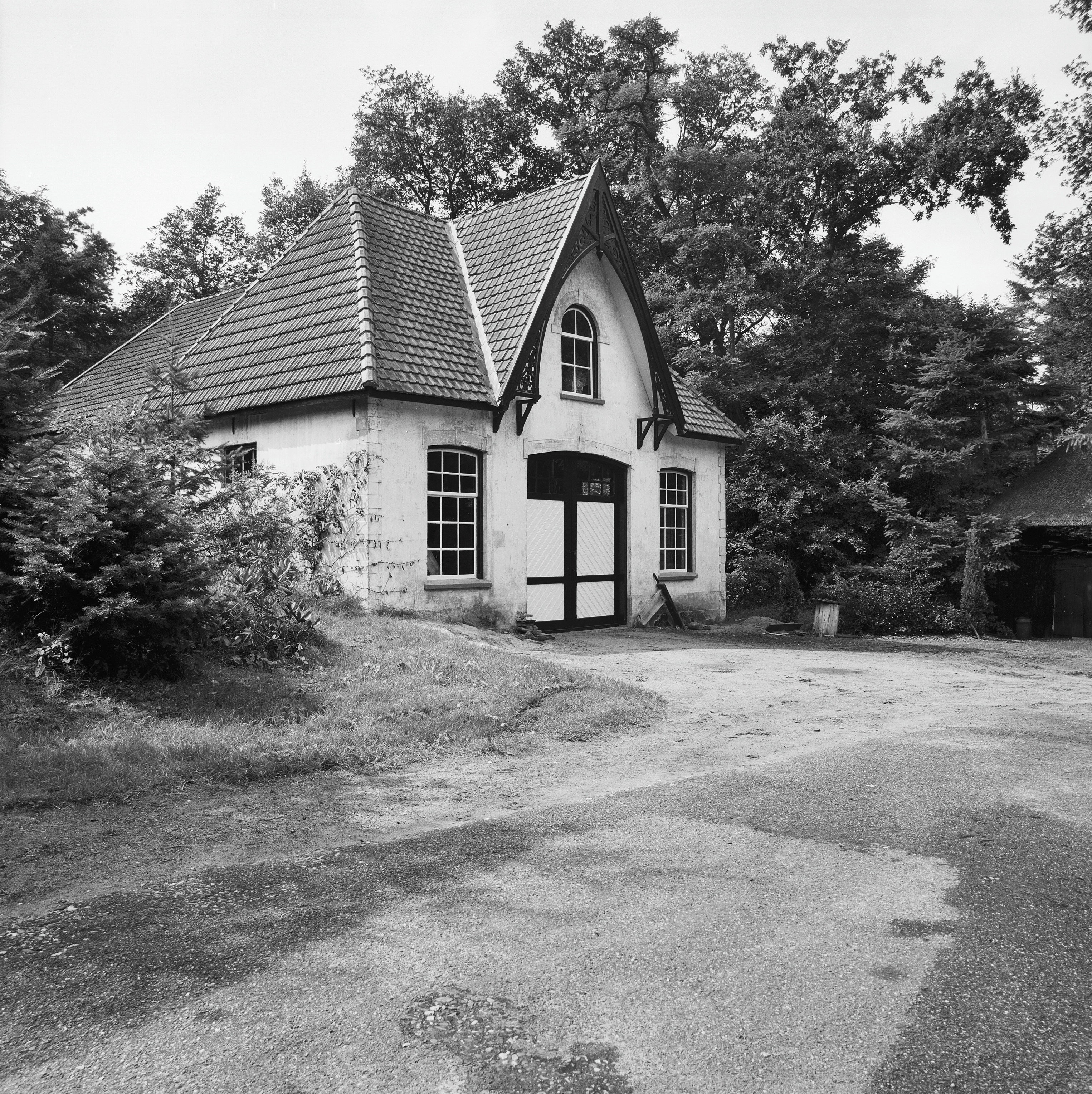
Carriage house (1979)
