= Dalmsholte =

- Hamlet
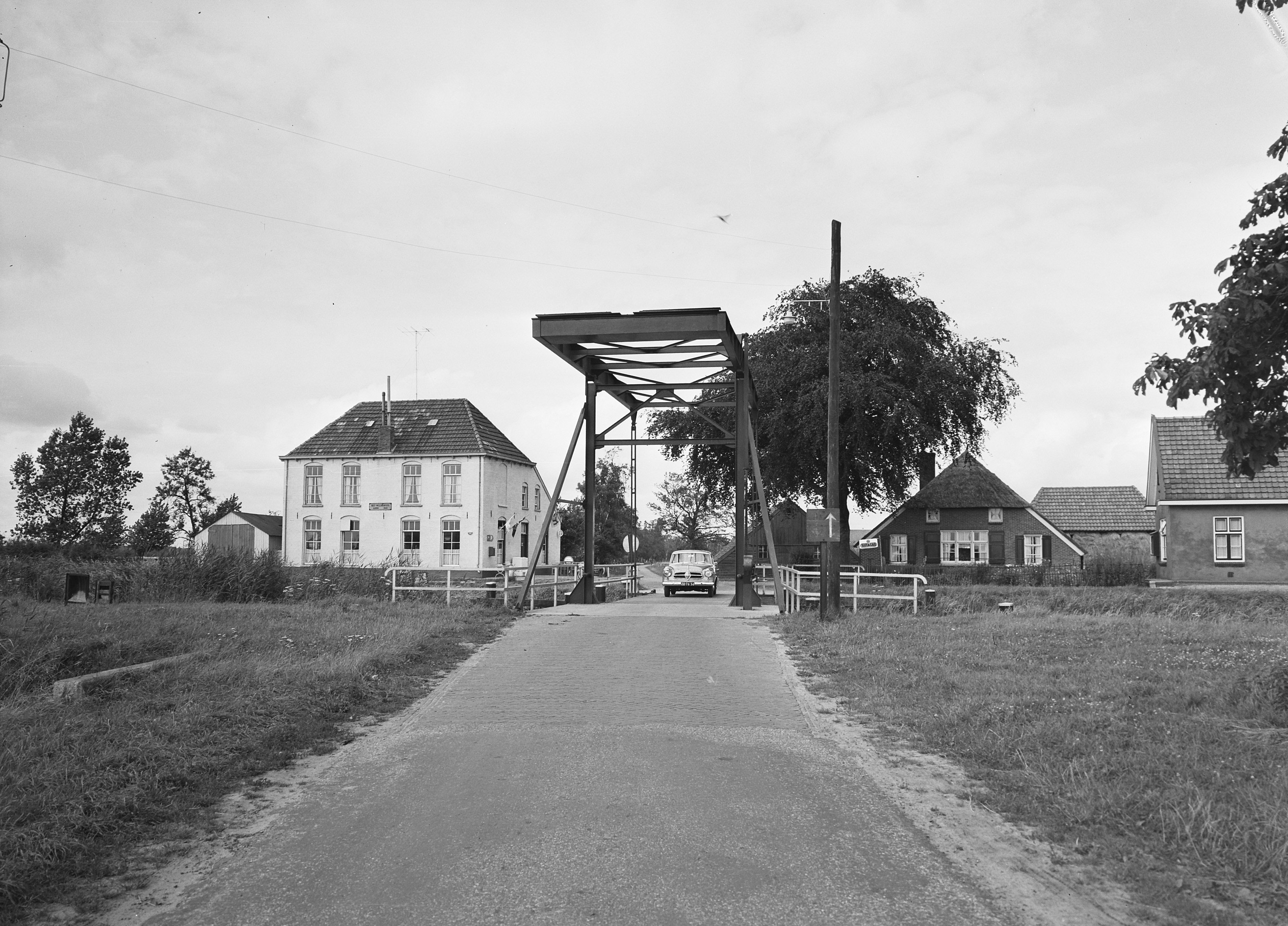
- Bridge at Dalmsholte

- The village (dark red) and the statistical district (light green) of Dalmsholte in the municipality of Ommen.

- Location in the Netherlands Dalmsholte (Netherlands)
- Coordinates: 52°28′32″N 6°21′54″E
- Country: Netherlands
- Province: Overijssel
- Municipality: Dalfsen/Ommen

Area
  - Total: 9.57 km^{2} (3.69 sq mi)
- Elevation: 5 m (16 ft)

Population (2021)
  - Total: 345
  - Density: 36.1/km^{2} (93.4/sq mi)
- Time zone: UTC+1 (CET)
  - Summer (DST): UTC+2 (CEST)
- Postal code: 8146
- Dialing code: 0572

Dalmsholte is a hamlet in the Dutch province of Overijssel. It is a part of the municipalities of Ommen and Dalfsen, and lies about 18 km east of Zwolle.

It was first mentioned between 1381 and 1383 as Dalmeshout. The etymology is unknown. The part of Dalmsholte in Ommen has a statistical entity and postal code, however the Dalfsen part is split between Lemelerveld and Dalfsen.
