= Maikel Kieftenbeld =

Dutch footballer (born 1990)

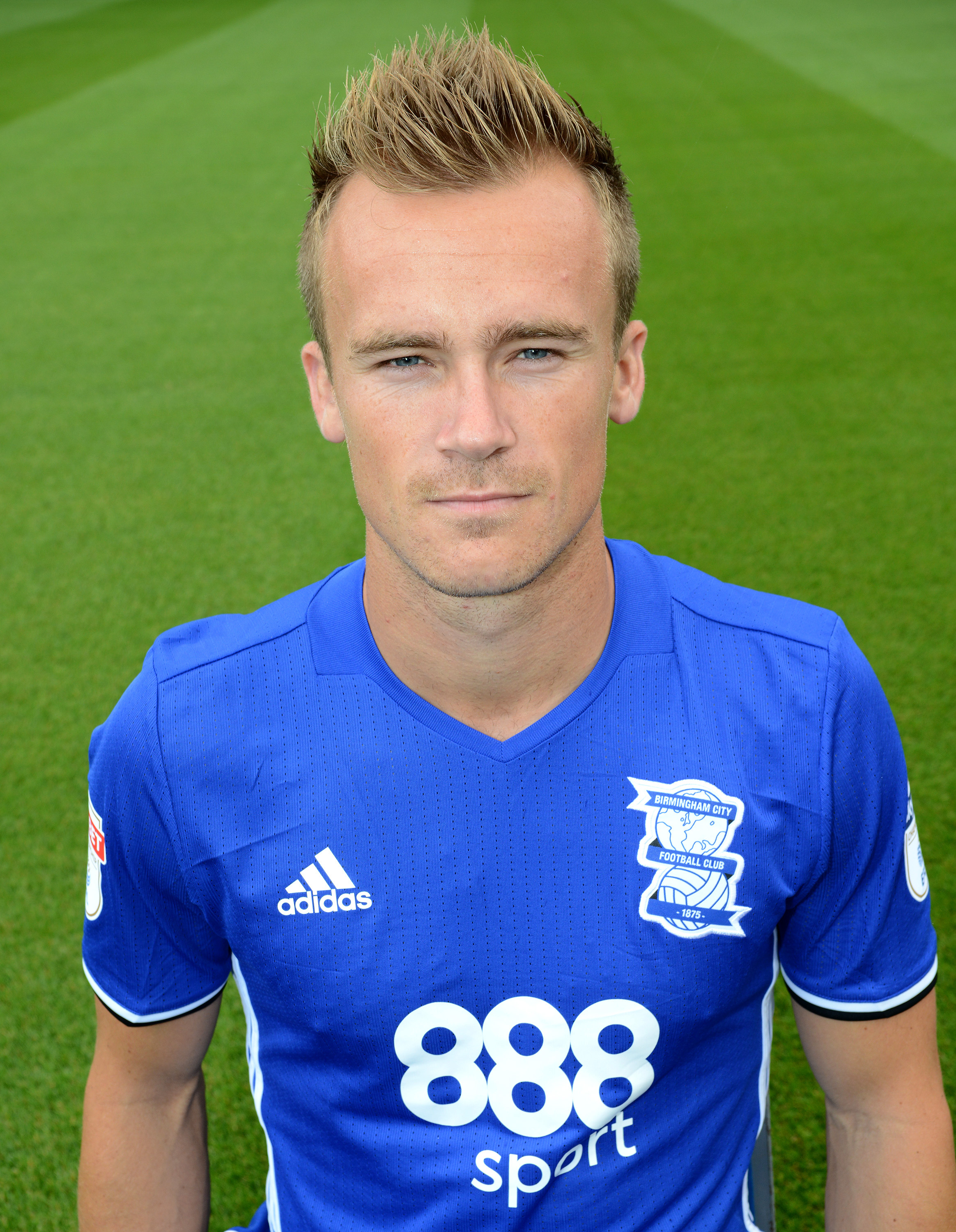
- Kieftenbeld with Birmingham City in 2016

Personal information
- Full name: Maikel Kieftenbeld
- Date of birth: 26 June 1990 (age 36)
- Place of birth: Lemelerveld, Dalfsen, Netherlands
- Height: 1.70 m (5 ft 7 in)
- Position: Defensive midfielder

Youth career
- –2003: Lemelerveld
- 2003–2007: Twente
- 2007–2008: Go Ahead Eagles

Senior career*
Years	Team	Apps	(Gls)
2008–2010	Go Ahead Eagles	63	(3)
2010–2015	Groningen	147	(2)
2015–2021	Birmingham City	170	(5)
2021–2022	Millwall	38	(0)
2022–2024	Emmen	30	(3)
2024–2025	Cambuur	22	(0)
Total		470	(13)

International career
2010–2011	Netherlands U21	5	(0)
- * Club domestic league appearances and goals

Maikel Kieftenbeld (Dutch pronunciation: [ˈmɑikəl ˈkiftə(m)bɛlt]; born 26 June 1990) is a Dutch former professional footballer who played as a defensive midfielder.

Kieftenbeld began his football career with his hometown club, VV Lemelerveld, before joining Twente's youth system as a young teenager. Twente let him leave for Eerste Divisie (second-tier) club Go Ahead Eagles in 2007, and a year later, he made his senior debut and signed his first professional contract. He spent two seasons as a regular member of GA Eagles' first team before joining Eredivisie club Groningen in 2010. He played as a right back during his first year with Groningen, switching to midfield in his second season. Appointed vice-captain for 2013–14, he took on the captaincy during the season, and helped the club qualify for European football for the first time in seven years. He captained Groningen to victory in the 2014–15 KNVB Cup final to win the first major trophy in the club's history. Ahead of the 2015–16 season, he joined Football League Championship (second-tier) club Birmingham City, where he was to spend five and a half years. After 18 months with another Championship club, Millwall, he returned to Dutch football in 2022. He spent two seasons with Emmen before joining Cambuur in 2024.

He played for the Netherlands Beloftenelftal at the 2012 Toulon Tournament, and was capped five times for his country at under-21 level.

== Personal life ==
Kieftenbeld was born on 26 June 1990 in Lemelerveld, in the municipality of Dalfsen, Netherlands, where he attended Heilig Hartschool primary school. After leaving school he began a college course in business economics, but did not complete it. He came from a sporty family. His mother, Anja, and one of his sisters played volleyball, another sister rode horses. His father, Joop, coached in the lower reaches of Dutch amateur football, including at SV SDOL of the Vijfde Klasse and the reserve team of Tweede Klasse club VV Lemerleveld, the hometown club where Maikel began playing football at the age of five.

== Club career ==
=== Go Ahead Eagles ===
Kieftenbeld was spotted by scouts from Twente, but after four seasons in their youth system, the staff believed he was not up to the required standard, so in 2007 he moved on to Deventer-based Eerste Divisie (second-tier) club Go Ahead Eagles. The following summer, he took part in the first-team's pre-season training camp in Germany, and made his senior debut on the opening day of the 2008–09 Eerste Divisie, on 8 August 2008 away to VVV-Venlo. He entered the game to replace the injured Ceriel Oosthout just before half-time with his team 1–0 down; they lost 5–0. In September, he signed his first professional contract, of three years with an option for a fourth. He scored his first senior goal on 24 April 2009 – the winner as Go Ahead Eagles beat Veendam 2–1 – and finished the season as a first-team regular with 30 league appearances.

In his second season, he helped Go Ahead Eagles to reach the final round of the promotion play-offs, in which they lost to Willem II. In April 2010, Kieftenbeld was being linked with a move to AZ, the reigning Dutch champions. By the beginning of June, all parties had agreed terms, but the financial situation at AZ and a change of ownership meant the deal did not proceed.

=== Groningen ===
==== 2010 to 2013 ====
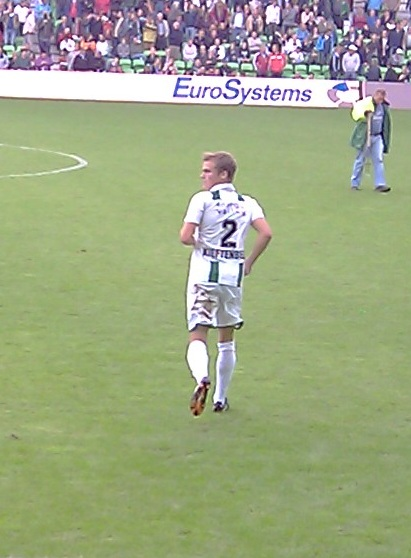
Kieftenbeld with Groningen in 2011

On 17 June 2010, the 19-year-old Kieftenbeld signed a four-year contract with Eredivisie club Groningen, who paid a €300,000 fee for the player. He was presented as a right back, despite only ever having played in midfield. In his first season at Groningen he did indeed play at right back, competently enough, but in a 5–1 defeat away to Feyenoord, he struggled against Ryo Miyaichi, a player with pace and ability with both feet, and eventually fouled him to concede a penalty. Groningen finished the season in fifth position, thus qualifying for the play-offs for a place in the Europa League. Kieftenbeld was sent off in the first leg of the semi-final, so was suspended for the second. He was replaced at half-time in the first leg of the final, which Groningen lost 5–1 to ADO Den Haag, and was an unused substitute in the second leg as they recovered from the four-goal deficit only to lose out on penalties.

In his second season, Kieftenbeld played regularly in his preferred position in midfield. He scored his first goal for Groningen on 30 October 2011 in what finished up as their biggest win ever against Feyenoord, by six goals to nil. Kieftenbeld's goal was the second of the six, a powerful drive from 30 metres (33 yd). In the January transfer window, Groningen turned down what was described as a substantial bid for him from Belgian Pro League club Club Brugge; having let Danny Holla join VVV-Venlo on loan, they were not prepared to lose another midfielder. His performances over the season earned him the supporters' vote as Player of the Year.

Kieftenbeld was more often substitute than starter in the first few weeks of 2012–13 under new manager Robert Maaskant, but went on to re-establish himself in the side. A minor knee injury sustained during the mid-season training camp meant he missed a couple of matches, and thereafter his appearances in the starting eleven were intermittent, whether through suspension or just not being selected. Groningen finished in seventh place, albeit 19 points behind Twente whom they faced in the play-offs. Kieftenbeld put in a strong performance in the first leg in a 1–0 defeat at home, but a 3–2 loss in the second leg confirmed that Groningen would not qualify for the Europa League.

==== 2013 to 2015 ====
Ahead of the 2013–14 season, Maaskant's replacement Erwin van de Looi appointed Kieftenbeld vice-captain, with Rasmus Lindgren as captain. He began the season on the bench, but soon came back into the starting eleven, frequently wore the captain's armband in Lindgren's absence, and reduced his yellow-card count in the first half of the season from his usual five or six to just one. Towards the end of the season, he captained the side even when Lindgren played – at the latter's recommendation – and according to the club's website, he was the inspiration for a ten-match unbeaten finish that meant Groningen qualified for European football for the first time in seven years. Technical director Henk Veldmate said he was a "worthy ambassador" for the club both on and off the field. Amid interest both from other Eredivisie clubs and from abroad, including Club Brugge, Kieftenbeld signed a new two-year contract. The negotiations were lengthy, but the player said he was happy staying where he was appreciated, and the prospect of European football played a part. According to the club, the player insisted on a release clause being included in the contract.

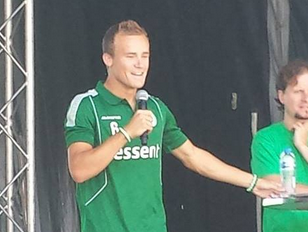
Kieftenbeld with Groningen in 2014

Groningen entered the 2014–15 Europa League in the second qualifying round. After a goalless draw in the away leg, opponents Aberdeen took a two-goal lead in the second leg. Kieftenbeld scored a headed goal just before half-time to reduce the deficit, but Aberdeen held out and Groningen were eliminated. Afterwards, Aberdeen's Jonny Hayes spoke of the motivation they drew from over-confident remarks reportedly made by Kieftenbeld and others ahead of the second leg which they perceived as disrespectful. Domestically, Kieftenbeld missed only one match in all competitions, through suspension, and played every minute of Groningen's 2014–15 KNVB Cup run. In the quarter-final, he "hammered in the fourth from the edge of the box" in a 4–0 defeat of Eredivisie club Vitesse Arnhem, and Groningen beat another top-flight club, Excelsior, 3–0 in the semi-final. In the final, Albert Rusnák's two goals were enough to beat cup-holders PEC Zwolle, and Kieftenbeld as captain lifted the first major trophy in the club's history.

Kieftenbeld was twice shortlisted for the Eredivisie's annual Maatschappelijk Speler (Community Player) award, which brings with it a €50,000 prize to be donated to a social project of the winner's choice. He was actively involved with Kids United, a football team for children with disabilities. Although he did not win on either occasion, his charity still benefited when the 2015 winner, Jeroen Zoet, shared the prize money with the other two nominees. In late July 2015, English club Birmingham City made a bid for Kieftenbeld's services that triggered the release clause in his contract. Although Groningen accepted they could not stop him leaving, they were disappointed not just at losing their captain so soon before the start of the new season, but at losing a player who did so much for the club in the community.

=== Birmingham City ===
==== 2015–2017 ====
On 27 July 2015, Kieftenbeld signed a three-year contract with Football League Championship (second-tier) club Birmingham City. The fee was officially undisclosed, but the release clause figure was widely reported as €250,000. He went straight into the starting eleven for the opening game of the season, playing alongside Stephen Gleeson in a 4–2–3–1 formation, "clattered around midfield breaking up play, putting in tackles and generally making it uncomfortable" for the opponents, and kept his place for the next few league matches. After David Davis's fine performance in the League Cup tie against Aston Villa was followed by mistakes in midfield in a poor defeat at home to Rotherham United, manager Gary Rowett included Davis alongside Kieftenbeld and Gleeson as Birmingham won 2–0 at Brentford. Minor injury restricted Kieftenbeld to a seat on the bench against Blackburn Rovers in early November, and Davis took over his role as Rowett reverted to a two-man central midfield. Although Rowett said Davis was unlucky not to start the visit to Brighton & Hove Albion at the end of the month, Kieftenbeld returned to the side to provide "a bit more control"; he was involved in an incident when Liam Rosenior suffered knee damage in what Brighton manager Chris Hughton accepted was "just a whole-hearted challenge".

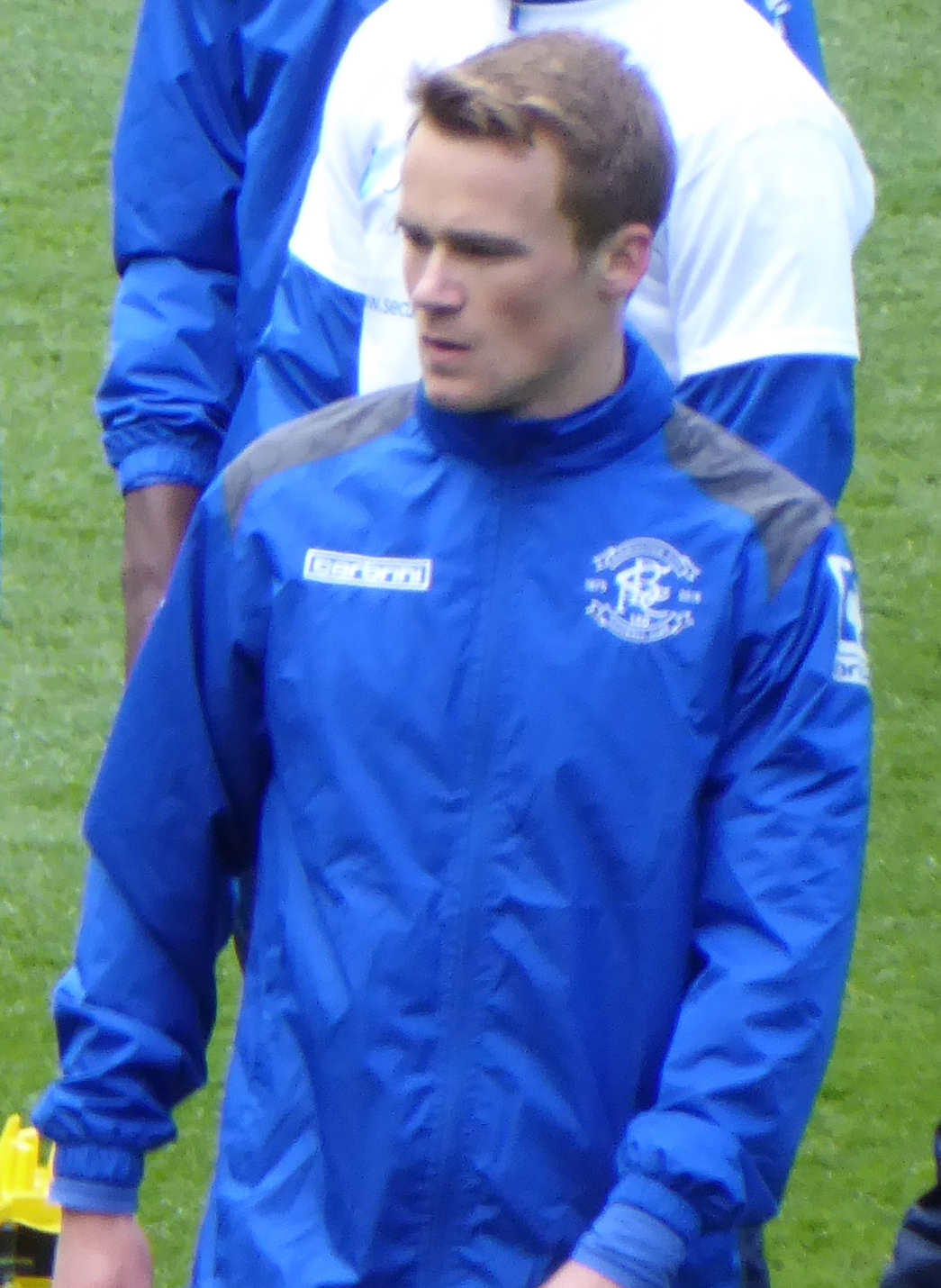
Kieftenbeld with Birmingham City in April 2016

Having scored just five times in more than 200 league matches in the Netherlands, Kieftenbeld registered three goals in 22 days in January 2016. In the 89th minute of the match at home to Brentford, he won the ball in midfield, played it through to James Vaughan, and kept running; when Vaughan shot across goal, Kieftenbeld arrived at the far post just in time to slide the ball home for the winner. At Derby County two weeks later, he ran on to a clearance and hit a powerful volley from outside the penalty area wide of the goalkeeper to complete a 3–0 victory, and repeated the feat in the next match, at home to Ipswich Town. The goals earned him a nomination for January's Championship Player of the Month, but he lost out to Hull City's Abel Hernández. Kieftenbeld was generally used in a three-man midfield, none of whom were particularly attack-minded, and any of the three had licence to go forward. He believed that his feeling of comfort at the club helped build up sufficient self-confidence that, so long as he had the energy to make forward runs, he could and would do so. In the latter part of the season, he was used as what Rowett called a "sitting playmaker", a role he had played in Dutch football, distributing the ball from a position in front of the defence. He started 41 league matches as Birmingham finished the season in mid-table.

A hip injury disrupted Kieftenbeld's pre-season, preventing his taking his place in a midfield further strengthened by the return of Robert Tesche to the club where he spent a successful loan spell in 2015. He was fit to start the next league match, a 2–1 win away to Leeds United, and produced what the Birmingham Mail dubbed "Almost the complete midfield performance from the Dutchman. He controlled the play throughout and rarely gave the ball away, the mark of any good midfielder. It's hard to believe a performance like this follows a stop start pre-season due to injury. A class act." When Tesche finally came into – and established himself in – the starting eleven, he and Kieftenbeld worked well together, demonstrating the sort of team spirit the latter believed might mitigate the financial disparity in the Championship. Kieftenbeld appeared regularly as the team reached seventh place, just outside the play-off positions, by mid-December, when Rowett was sacked and replaced by Gianfranco Zola.

Kieftenbeld initially lost his place after the arrival of loanee Craig Gardner in January, as Zola experimented with personnel and formations in midfield. He came back into the side for Birmingham's first win under the new manager, at home to Fulham on 4 February, scored his only goal of the season three weeks later with an opportunist effort in a 2–1 win away to Wolverhampton Wanderers, and retained his starting place thereafter. After Zola resigned in April, Kieftenbeld played all but a couple of minutes of the remaining three matches under Harry Redknapp's management as Birmingham avoided relegation by winning at Bristol City on the final day of the season.

==== 2017–present ====
Kieftenbeld made five appearances for Birmingham at the start of the 2017–18 season; he was sent off against Bristol City for serious foul play, but the dismissal was rescinded on appeal. On 31 August, he signed a two-year contract with Gary Rowett's new club, Derby County, for an undisclosed fee. He explained afterwards, "I wanted to fight for my spot but I need a fair chance and if someone lets you know on deadline day that you don't have that feeling it's a fair chance, what can you do?" However, the league refused to ratify the transfer because the documentation had not been submitted before the transfer window closed, so he remained a Birmingham player. Although Redknapp welcomed him back as part of the squad, neither he nor caretaker manager Lee Carsley selected him. The Birmingham Mail's Brian Dick wrote that "there was always going to be a place in the Birmingham squad for a player of Kieftenbeld's energy, industry and sheer professionalism", and that Redknapp's failure to see that reflected badly on him.

He finally regained a place in the team in mid-October, in Steve Cotterill's first match as manager, starting in defensive midfield as Birmingham beat league-leaders Cardiff City 1–0. His performances earned him a contract extension until 2020 with an option for a further year. Kieftenbeld kept his place under Cotterill and his successor Garry Monk, with whom the team again retained their Championship status on the last day of the season, this time by putting an end to Fulham's 23-game unbeaten run.

Kieftenbeld was sent off in October 2018 when the fourth official advised the referee that he had pushed Brentford's Neal Maupay in the face in an off-the-ball incident. Monk was sent to the stands for using abusive language while contesting the decision, and accepted a fine and one-match touchline ban, but Kieftenbeld's dismissal was overturned on appeal. His only goal of the season came in December, when he overhit a long pass to Ché Adams and Preston North End's goalkeeper, Declan Rudd, let the ball through his legs and into the net; towards the end of the match, he passed rather more accurately to Adams who scored to complete a 3–0 win.

During his 38th appearance of the season, against Leeds United in April, Kieftenbeld ruptured the anterior cruciate ligament and damaged the medial ligament in his right knee. After surgery, he was expected to be out for up to nine months. In a gesture of support, the club took up the option for an additional year on his contract; once returned to fitness, he confirmed how much it had helped to be able to concentrate on making a full recovery without the pressure of worrying about a new contract. According to the Mail's season review, "in any other season" – one in which the strikers had been less productive: Adams scored 22 goals and Lukas Jutkiewicz reached double figures in both goals and assists – Kieftenbeld "might have been a contender" for the club's Player of the Year award.

He returned to the matchday squad on 15 February 2020 as an unused substitute, returned to the pitch eleven days later, playing the last 20 minutes of a goalless draw away to Millwall. and "turned in a typically spiky 80 minutes" in the FA Cup fifth round tie away to third-placed Premier League team Leicester City. When the season resumed after the COVID-19 pandemic-related suspension, he played in five of the nine remaining matches as Birmingham again narrowly avoided relegation.

Ahead of the 2020–21 season under new manager Aitor Karanka, Kieftenbeld was told that he was free to leave, although if he did not, he would be treated like any other squad member and would play if needed. He was behind Ivan Šunjić, Gary Gardner, new arrivals Mikel San José and Adam Clayton, and the youthful Caolan Boyd-Munce in the pecking order. He started in the EFL Cup defeat to fourth-tier Cambridge United, but his next appearance was not for another two months, when injuries and a change of shape against AFC Bournemouth gave both him and Boyd-Munce a place in the starting eleven.

After another month, he was brought in to partner Šunjić in a 4–2–3–1 formation away to Bristol City. Birmingham won the match, Kieftenbeld kept his place, produced a "trademark display of energy and edge" as Birmingham won again, and Karanka described him as "the kind of player who creates the spirit in the team". He remained in the side for several more matches, adding energy and dynamism but not ball retention as the team slipped towards the relegation places.

=== Millwall ===
Kieftenbeld became Gary Rowett's first permanent signing of the January 2021 transfer window when he signed an 18-month contract with Championship club Millwall.

=== Emmen ===
On 12 June 2022, Kieftenbeld signed a two-year contract with Emmen. He made his competitive debut for Emmen on 6 August, the first matchday of the 2022–23 Eredivisie season, scoring an own goal in a 4–1 loss to PSV Eindhoven. He tore his anterior cruciate ligament late in the game, ending his season after one appearance. In 2023–24, he regained fitness, played increasingly regularly, and captained the team as they reached the semi-final of the promotion play-offs. He was reportedly "very surprised" when he was released at the end of his contract without an offer of renewal.

=== Cambuur ===
Kieftenbeld joined Eerste Divisie club Cambuur on 13 August 2024 on a one-year contract.

== International career ==
Kieftenbeld made his first appearance in international football for the Netherlands Beloftenelftal (Promises Team), an under-21 team providing a stepping-stone between the under-19 team and the full under-21 team, in March 2010. He played the first half of a 2–1 defeat in a friendly match against Slovenia U21. After Leroy Fer and Dirk Marcellis were requisitioned for the senior squad in August 2010, Kieftenbeld received his first under-21 call-up, and made his debut as a second-half substitute in a 2011 European Championship qualifier against Liechtenstein, He also played against Spain in September with the group already won: taking the field after 66 minutes, he was sent off 12 minutes later for a foul on Ander Herrera. He made his first start for the under-21s in a friendly against Denmark in November 2010, playing at right back in a 3–1 win; his through ball set up Bas Dost for the third goal. He played in two more U21 friendlies, against the Czech Republic and Germany, and was an unused substitute in four Euro 2013 qualifiers in 2011 and 2012. His last international appearances were at the 2012 Toulon Tournament, at which the Netherlands were represented by the Beloftenelftal; he played in four of their five matches.

== Style of play ==
Dutch journalist Michiel Jongsma suggests that Kieftenbeld's position of choice is as a holding midfielder in front of the defence, where he can best use his energy in recovering the ball. He is comfortable on the ball and able to distribute it, but can be careless in possession, and "he really tries to shake up things when the play has gone dormant. In that lies his weakness as well – he can pick up silly fouls and cards from time to time." With Groningen, he averaged eight yellow cards a season. According to Groningen's technical director Henk Veldmate, speaking in 2014, his battling style and never-say-die attitude made him the sort of player with whom supporters could identify. In a 2011 interview, Kieftenbeld described himself as a perfectionist who always wanted to improve, and said that he sometimes put too much pressure on himself.

Steve Cotterill sees him as "very much a team player, a bit of an unsung hero. He does a lot of tidying up and you need those type of players. There are other sides to his game as well. He's a better player than he's given credit for and, more importantly, he's a top lad. He's low maintenance, there's no ego about him and he just quietly gets on with his job."

== Career statistics ==
As of match played 24 January 2025

Appearances and goals by club, season and competition
Club	Season	League			National cup (Note: Includes KNVB Cup, FA Cup)		League cup (Note: Includes EFL Cup)		Other		Total	
Club	Season	Division	Apps	Goals	Apps	Goals	Apps	Goals	Apps	Goals	Apps	Goals
Go Ahead Eagles	2008–09	Eerste Divisie	30	1	2	0	—		—		32	1
Go Ahead Eagles	2009–10	Eerste Divisie	33	2	5	0	—		4 (Note: Appearances in Eerste Divisie promotion playoffs)	0	42	2
Go Ahead Eagles	Total		63	3	7	0	—		4	0	74	3
Groningen	2010–11	Eredivisie	31	0	4	0	—		2 (Note: Appearances in European competition play-offs)	0	37	0
Groningen	2011–12	Eredivisie	26	1	1	0	—		—		27	1
Groningen	2012–13	Eredivisie	27	1	3	0	—		2	0	32	1
Groningen	2013–14	Eredivisie	28	0	3	0	—		3	0	34	0
Groningen	2014–15	Eredivisie	33	0	6	1	—		2 (Note: Appearances in UEFA Europa League)	1	41	2
Groningen	Total		145	2	17	1	—		9	1	171	4
Birmingham City	2015–16	Championship	42	3	1	0	2	0	—		45	3
Birmingham City	2016–17	Championship	39	1	2	0	1	0	—		42	1
Birmingham City	2017–18	Championship	35	0	1	0	2	1	—		38	1
Birmingham City	2018–19	Championship	36	1	1	0	1	0	—		38	1
Birmingham City	2019–20	Championship	8	0	1	0	0	0	—		9	0
Birmingham City	2020–21	Championship	10	0	1	0	1	0	—		12	0
Birmingham City	Total		170	5	7	0	7	1	—		184	6
Millwall	2020–21	Championship	11	0	—		—		—		11	0
Millwall	2021–22	Championship	27	0	1	0	1	0	—		29	0
Millwall	Total		37	0	1	0	1	0	—		39	0
Emmen	2022–23	Eredivisie	1	0	0	0	—		0	0	1	0
Emmen	2023–24	Eerste Divisie	29	3	1	0	—		4	0	34	3
Emmen	Total		30	3	1	0	—		4	0	35	3
Cambuur	2024–25	Eerste Divisie	14	0	2	0	—		0	0	16	0
Career total			459	13	35	1	8	1	17	1	519	16

== Honours ==
Groningen

- KNVB Cup: 2014–15
