= Lemelerveld =

- Village
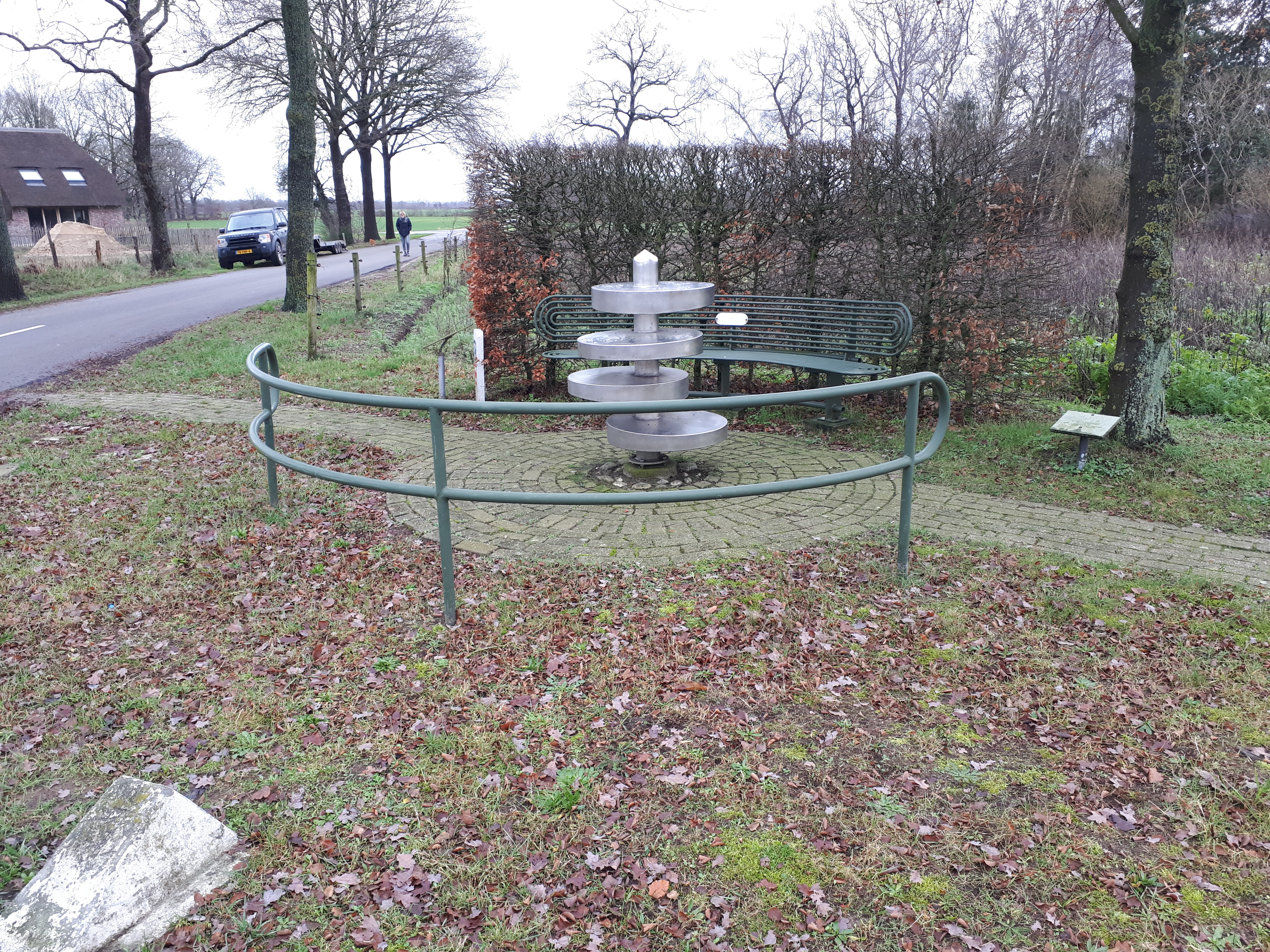
- Four municipalities point

- Location in province of Overijssel in the Netherlands Lemelerveld (Netherlands)
- Coordinates: 52.4453°N 6.3401°E
- Country: Netherlands
- Province: Overijssel
- Municipality: Dalfsen

Area
  - Total: 21.43 km^{2} (8.27 sq mi)
- Elevation: 6 m (20 ft)

Population (2021)
  - Total: 4,740
  - Density: 221/km^{2} (573/sq mi)
- Time zone: UTC+1 (CET)
  - Summer (DST): UTC+2 (CEST)
- Postal code: 8151 & 8152
- Dialing code: 0572

Lemelerveld (also: Sukerbietndorp) is a village in the municipality of Dalfsen in the province of Overijssel, Netherlands. The village developed around a sugar beet factory.

== History ==
The area around Lemelerveld used to consist of wild moorlands and was nearly uninhabited except for some shepherds and the occasional poacher. In 1854, the peat excavation village of Dalmsholte was established. Nearby, at the intersection of the canal from Zwolle to Almelo with the canal from Raalte and Deventer, a sugar beet factory was constructed in 1865. The factory attracted a large work force, and a village developed which was colloquially called "Sukerbietndorp" (Sugar beet village). In 1874, a Catholic church and monastery was founded in the village. The monastery was demolished in 1986. In 1899, it was first called Lemelerveld, and means "field near Lemele".

On 25 November 1944, a weapons stash of the Dutch resistance was discovered in the attic of the Dutch Reformed Church. Minister Vogelaar managed to escape and hide. The church was closed by the German authorities. Vogelaar survived the war, and returned to his church. In 2010, a monument was revealed near the church.

Lemelerveld used to be split in the municipalities of Dalfsen, Ommen, Heino, and Raalte. In 1992, the Provincial Council of Overijssel wanted to move all parts in one municipality, and called a referendum. The majority of the population of Lemerveld voted to maintain the status quo, and the merger was cancelled. In 1997, all parts of Lemelerveld were merged into Dalfsen. In 1999, a monument was revealed at the point where all four municipalities used to meet.

== Salland Airstrip ==
Salland Airstrip is a little airfield near Lemelerveld which is owned by Aero Club Salland and used for training and recreational flying. It has a 1,200 metres (3,900 ft) grass runway. A radar installation is located at the airstrip.

== Nature ==
The nature area Lemelerberg is located near the village. It is a 78 metres (256 ft) high remnant of the Ice Age, and was considered too dry and poor for cultivation. It was used by shepherds which resulted in a large heath area.

The Luttenbergerven is a 45.9 hectares (113 acres) nature area with swamps, moist meadows and heaths which was considered too wet, and also escaped the large scale cultivation projects.

== Notable people ==
- Maikel Kieftenbeld (born 1990), footballer

== Gallery ==
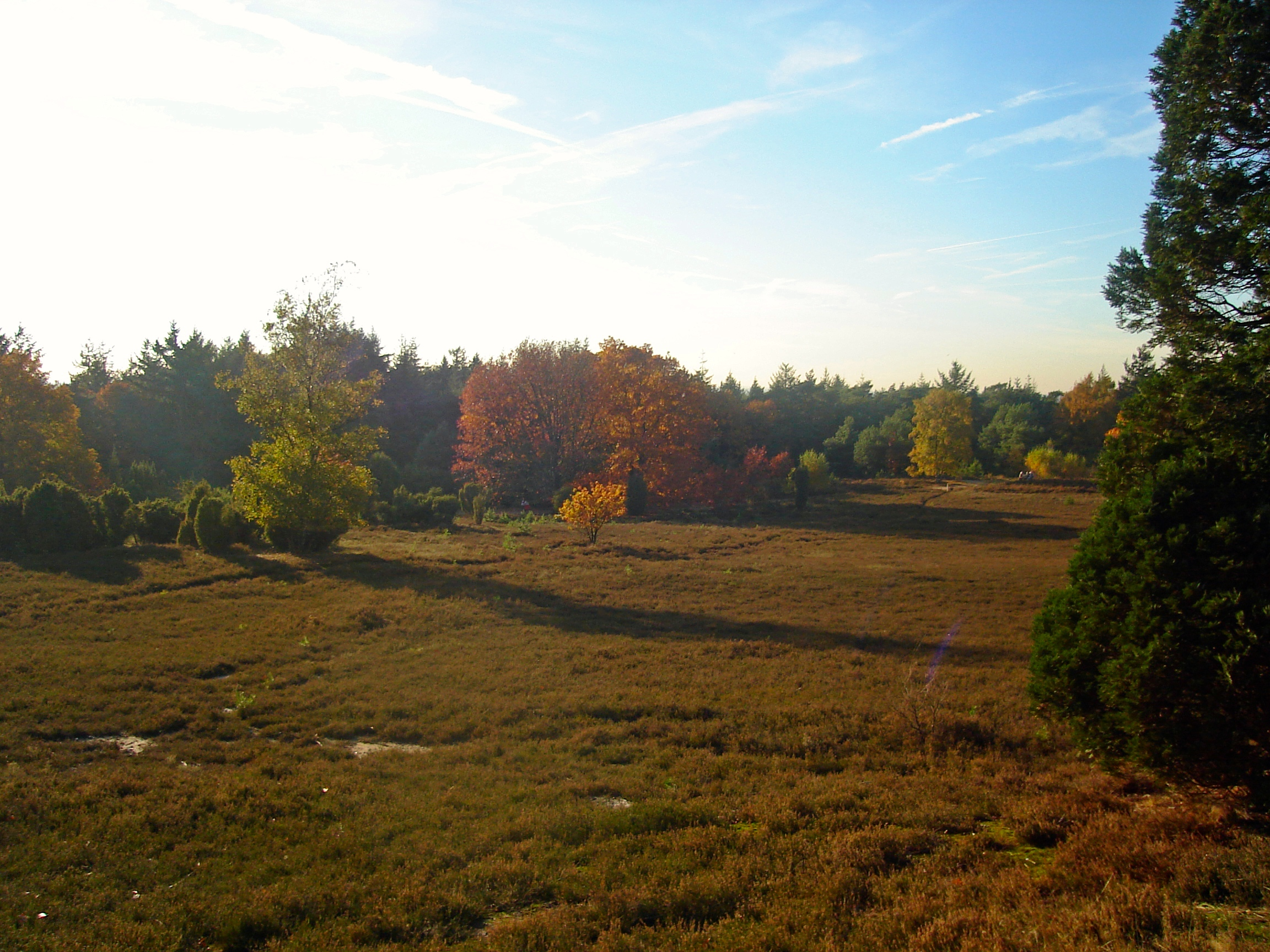
Nature near Lemelerveld

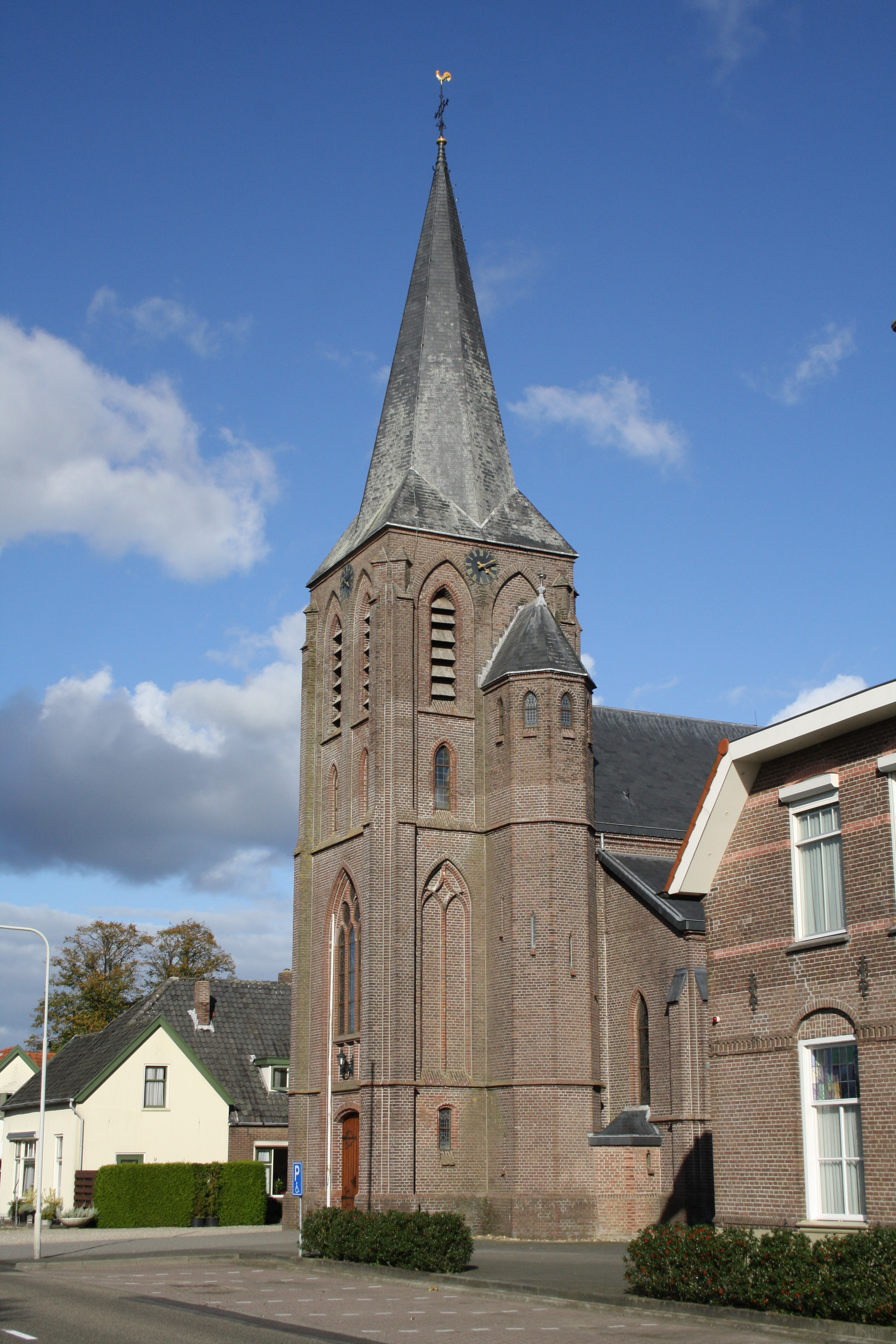
Church of Lemelerveld

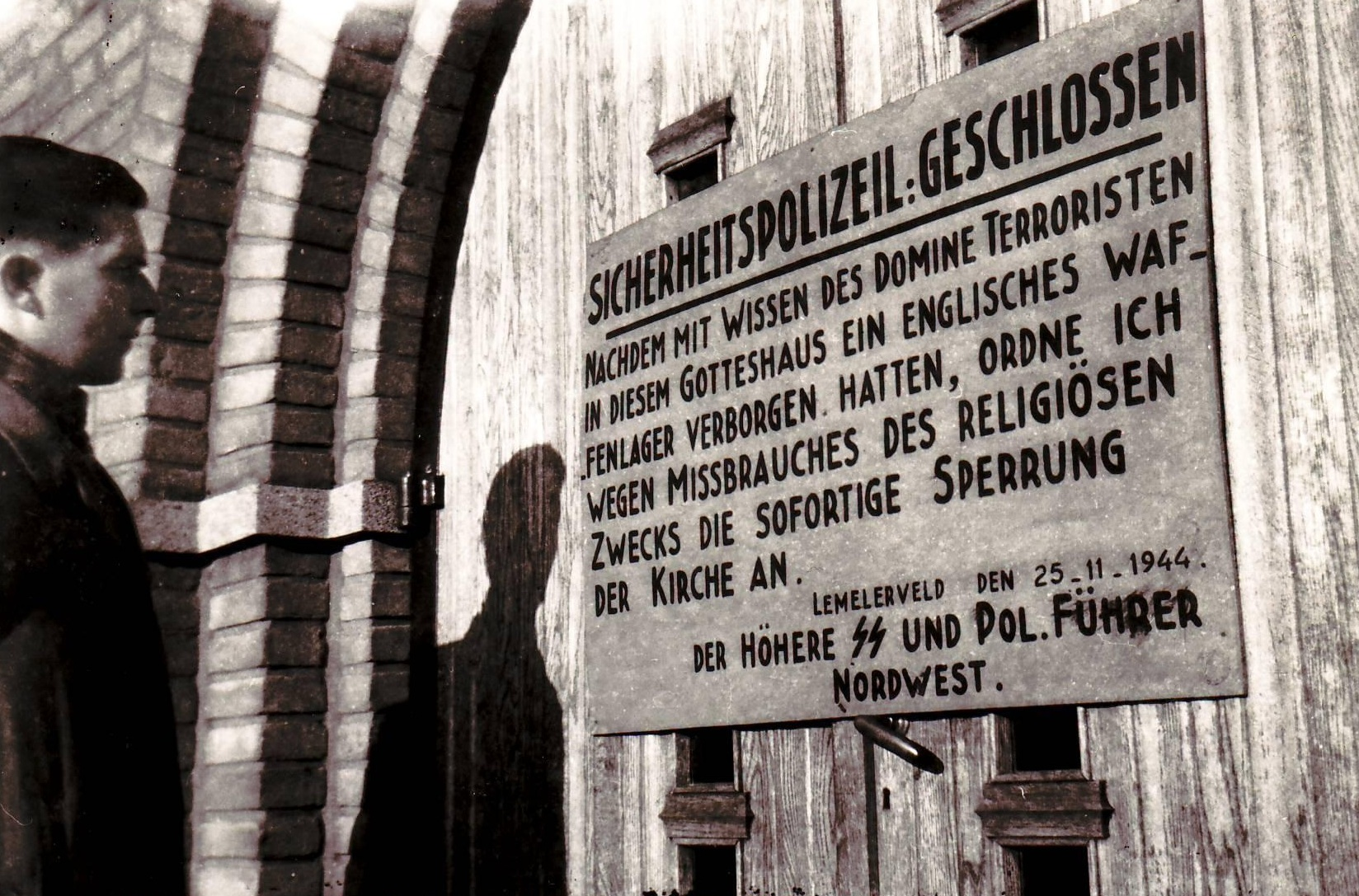
Church closed due to terrorist activities (after November 1944)
