= Immanuel Gottlieb Huschke =

German classical philologist

Immanuel Gottlieb Huschke (8 January 1761 in Greußen, Schwarzburg-Sondershausen – 18 February 1828) was a German classical philologist.

== Academic background ==
He studied theology and philology at the University of Jena. After several years spent working in the Netherlands, he returned to Germany in 1800, taking up residence with his brother in the town of Munden. In 1802 he gained his habilitation at the University of Göttingen, where he taught classes in Greek and Latin literature.

In 1806 he was appointed professor of Greek literature at the University of Rostock, where he remained until his death in 1828 (for several years of his tenure at Rostock, he was on leave for health reasons). In 1813 he was named university rector, and following the death of Oluf Gerhard Tychsen (1734–1815), he was appointed head of the school's library.

== Written works ==
His principal work was an analysis of the "Anthologia Graeca" (Greek Anthology, 1800). He also published noted works on the Roman poets Tibullus and Propertius, the epic poem "Argonautica Orphica" and the Greek lyric poet Archilochus.

- Epistola critica in Propertium, 1792
- Analecta critica in Anthologiam Graecam, 1800
- Dissertatio de fabulis Archilochi, 1803
- Commentatio de Orphei Argonauticis, 1806
- Albii Tibulli Carmina, 1819
- Albii Tibulli opera omnia, 1822
- Analecta litteraria, 1827.
