= Joan van Broekhuizen =

Dutch classical scholar and poet (1649–1707)

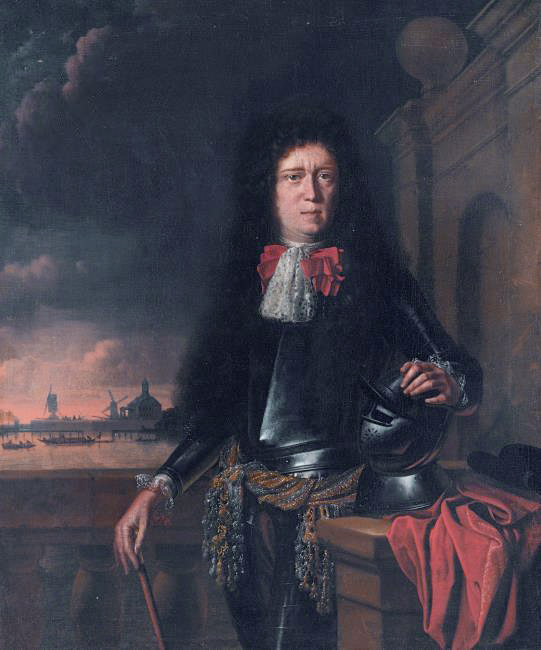
Joan van Broekhuizen (1649–1707) (Ludolf Bakhuizen)

Joan van Broekhuizen, Latinised as Janus Broukhusius (1649 – 15 December 1707), Dutch classical scholar and poet, was born to simple parents in Amsterdam on 20 November 1649. His father died when he was very young, and his uncle placed him at the Latin school, where he showed great promise. His uncle later apprenticed him to an apothecary, with whom he lived several years. Not liking this employment, he entered the army, and in 1674 was sent with his regiment to America, in the fleet under Admiral Michiel de Ruyter, but returned to Holland the same year.

In 1678 he was sent to the garrison at Utrecht, where he contracted a friendship with the celebrated Graevius; here he had the misfortune to be so deeply implicated in a duel that, according to the laws of Holland, his life was forfeited. Graevius, however, wrote immediately to Nicholas Heinsius, who obtained his pardon. Not long afterwards he became a captain of one of the companies then at Amsterdam. After the Treaty of Ryswick in 1697, his company was disbanded, and he retired on a pension to a country house near Amsterdam and pursued his classical and literary studies at leisure. His Dutch poems, in which he followed the model of Pieter Hooft, were first published in 1677; a later edition, with a biography by D. van Hoogstraten, appeared in 1712, the last edition, 1883, was edited by R. A. Kollewijn. His classical reputation rests on his editions of Propertius (1702) and Tibullus (1707). His Latin poems (Carmina) appeared in 1684; a later edition (Poemata) by D. van Hoogstraten appeared in 1711. The Select Letters (Jani Broukhusii Epistolae Selectae, 1889 and 1893) were edited by J. A. Worp, who also wrote his biography, 1891. Broekhuizen died on 15 December 1707.
