= Domitius Marsus =

Latin poet

Domitius Marsus (/ˈmɑːrsəs/; died c. 15 BC) was a Latin poet, friend of Virgil and Tibullus, and contemporary of Horace.

He survived Tibullus (died 19 BC), but was no longer alive when Ovid wrote (c. 12 AD) the epistle from Pontus (Ex Ponto, iv. 16) containing a list of poets. He was the author of a collection of epigrams called Cicuta ("hemlock") for their bitter sarcasm, and of a beautiful epitaph on the death of Tibullus; of elegiac poems, probably of an erotic character; of an epic poem Amazonis; and of a prose work on wit (De urbanitate).

Martial often alluded to Marsus as one of his predecessors, but he was never mentioned by Horace, although a passage in the Odes (iv. 4, 19) is supposed to be an indirect allusion to the Amazonis.
