= Dalfsen =

Dalfsen Dalsen (Sallands)
- Municipality
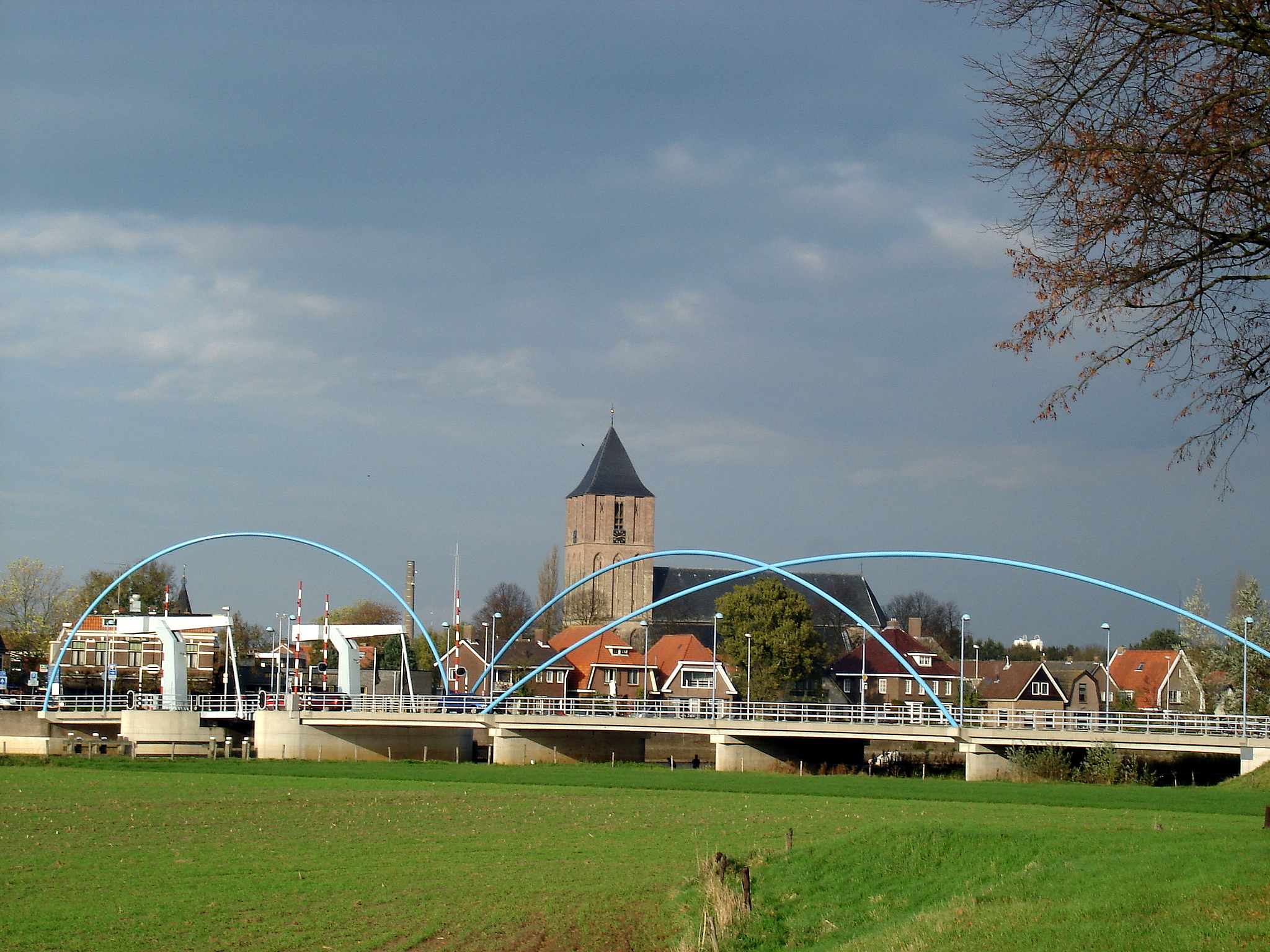
- Dalfsen town centre

- Flag Coat of arms

- Location in Overijssel
- Coordinates: 52°30′N 6°15′E
- Country: Netherlands
- Province: Overijssel

Government
  - Body: Municipal council
  - Mayor: Michael Sijbom (CDA)

Area
  - Total: 166.52 km^{2} (64.29 sq mi)
  - Land: 165.07 km^{2} (63.73 sq mi)
  - Water: 1.45 km^{2} (0.56 sq mi)
- Elevation: 3 m (9.8 ft)

Population (January 2021)
  - Total: 28,901
  - Density: 175/km^{2} (450/sq mi)
- Demonym(s): Dalfsenaar, Dalfser
- Time zone: UTC+1 (CET)
  - Summer (DST): UTC+2 (CEST)
- Postcode: 7710–7714, 7720–7729, 8150–8159
- Area code: 0529, 0572
- Website: www.dalfsen.nl

Dalfsen (Dutch: [ˈdɑl(ə)fsə(n)]; Dutch Low Saxon: Dalsen) is a municipality and a town in the Salland region of the Dutch province of Overijssel. On 1 January 2001, the municipalities of Nieuwleusen and Dalfsen were merged. A variety of Sallands is spoken here by segment of the population.

== History ==
The name first appears in documents in 1231. Due to the closeness of Kasteel Rechteren, Dalfsen is one of several towns along the Overijssel section of the Vecht river never to have received city rights.

In 2015, archaeologists found a burial ground dating from the TRB-period (3000-2750 BC) containing 141 burial pits. The TRB dates back to the last phase of the Middle Neolithic period, which is known for its megalithic monuments in northern Europe.

== Population centres ==
- Ankum
- Dalfsen
- Dalfserveld
- Dalmsholte
- De Marshoek
- De Meele
- Emmen
- Gerner
- Hessum
- Hoonhorst
- Lemelerveld
- Lenthe
- Leusenerveld
- Nieuwleusen
- Oudleusen
- Oudleusenerveld
- Rechteren
- Strenkhaar
- Welsum

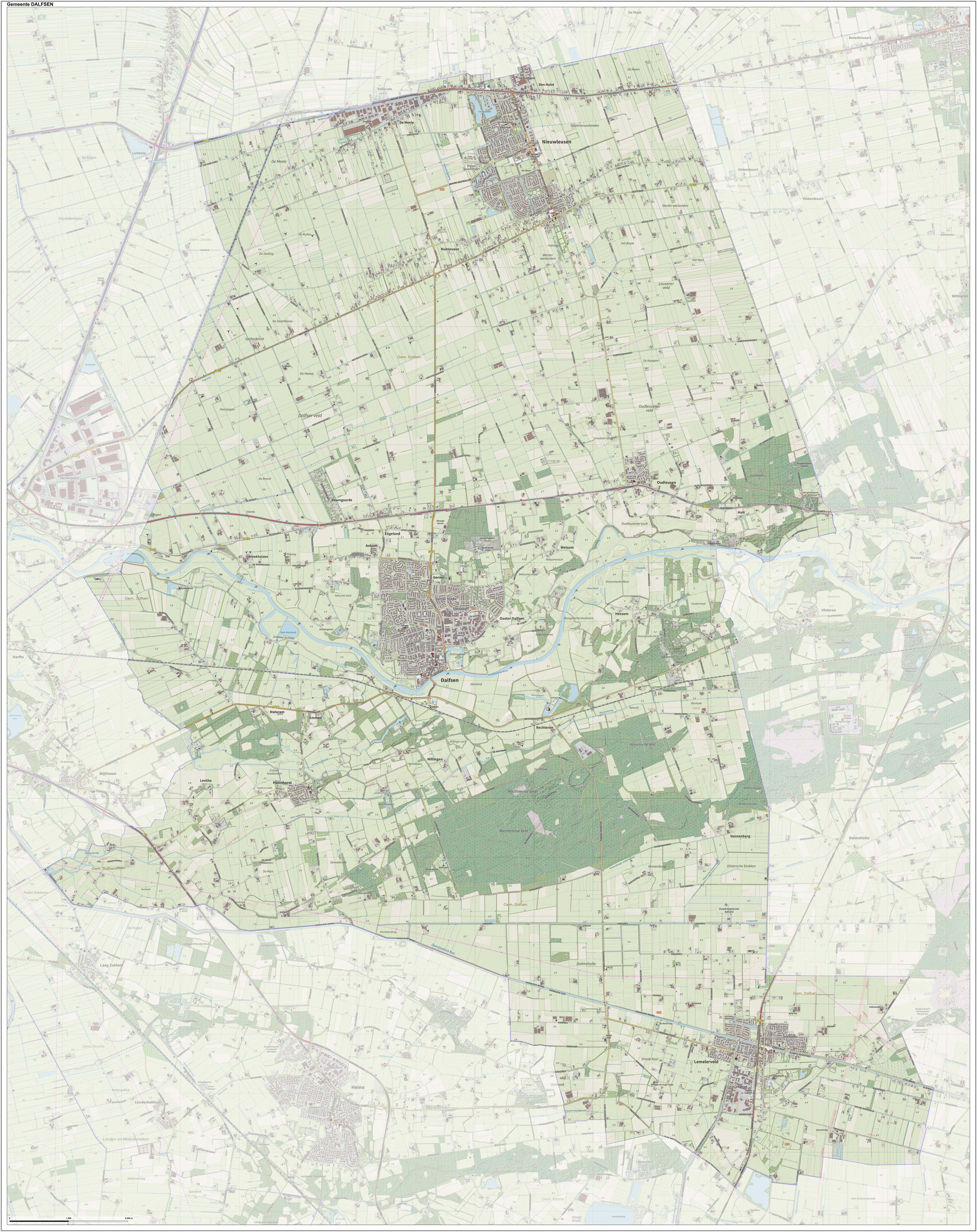
Dutch Topographic map of the municipality of Dalfsen, June 2015

== Notable people ==
- Willem Lodewijk de Vos van Steenwijk (1859 – 1947), Dutch politician
- Peter Nijkamp (born 1946), economist
- Ilse Warringa (born 1975), actress

=== Sports ===
- René Eijkelkamp (born 1964 ), footballer and coach
- Erben Wennemars (born 1975), speed skater
- Manon Nummerdor-Flier (born 1984), volleyball player
- Korie Homan (born 1986), wheelchair tennis player, gold medalist at the 2008 Paralympics
- Maikel Kieftenbeld (born 1990), professional footballer

== Sport ==
The handball team SV Dalfsen Handbal is several times Dutch Champion.

== Gallery ==
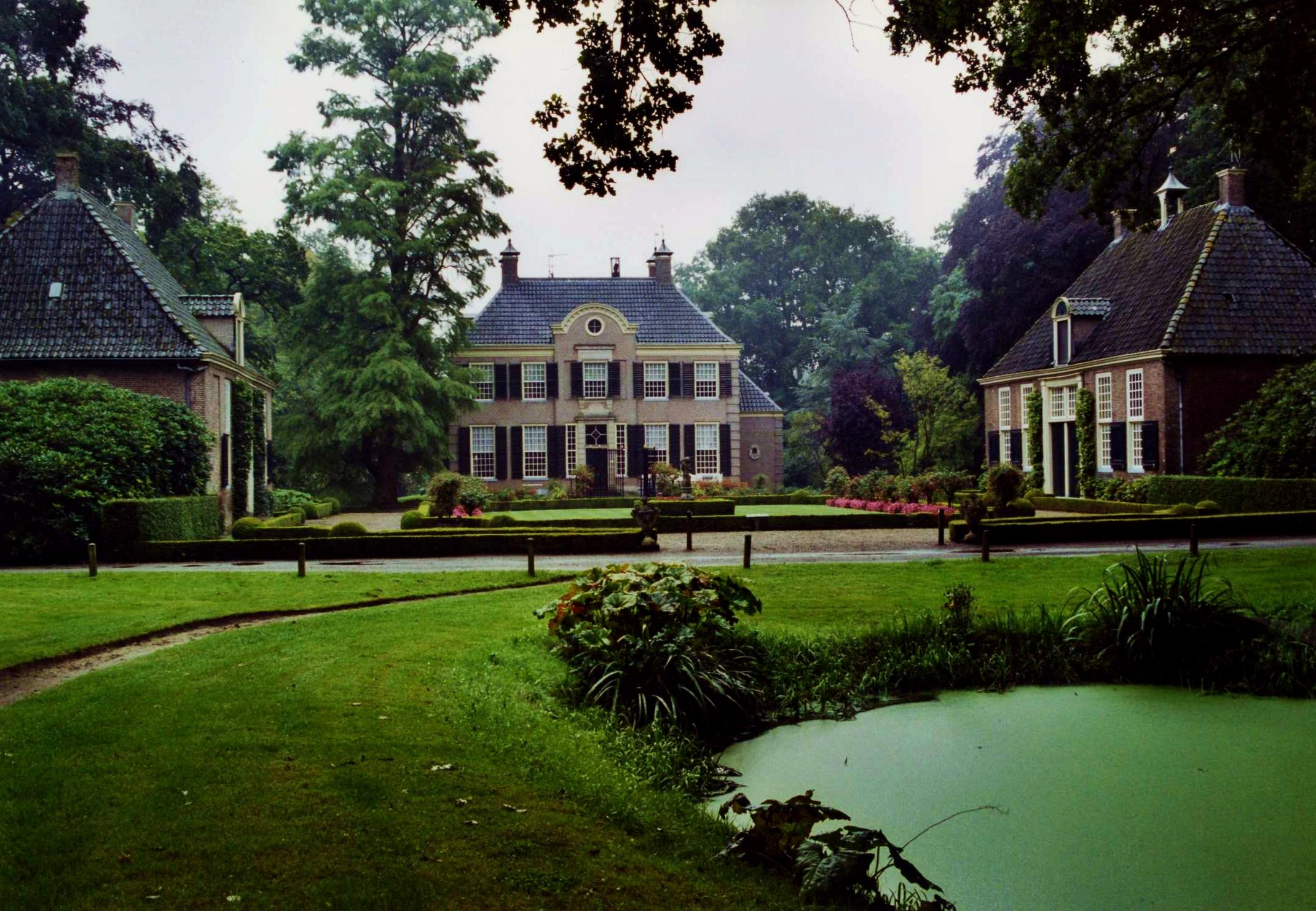
Aalshorst Dalfsen

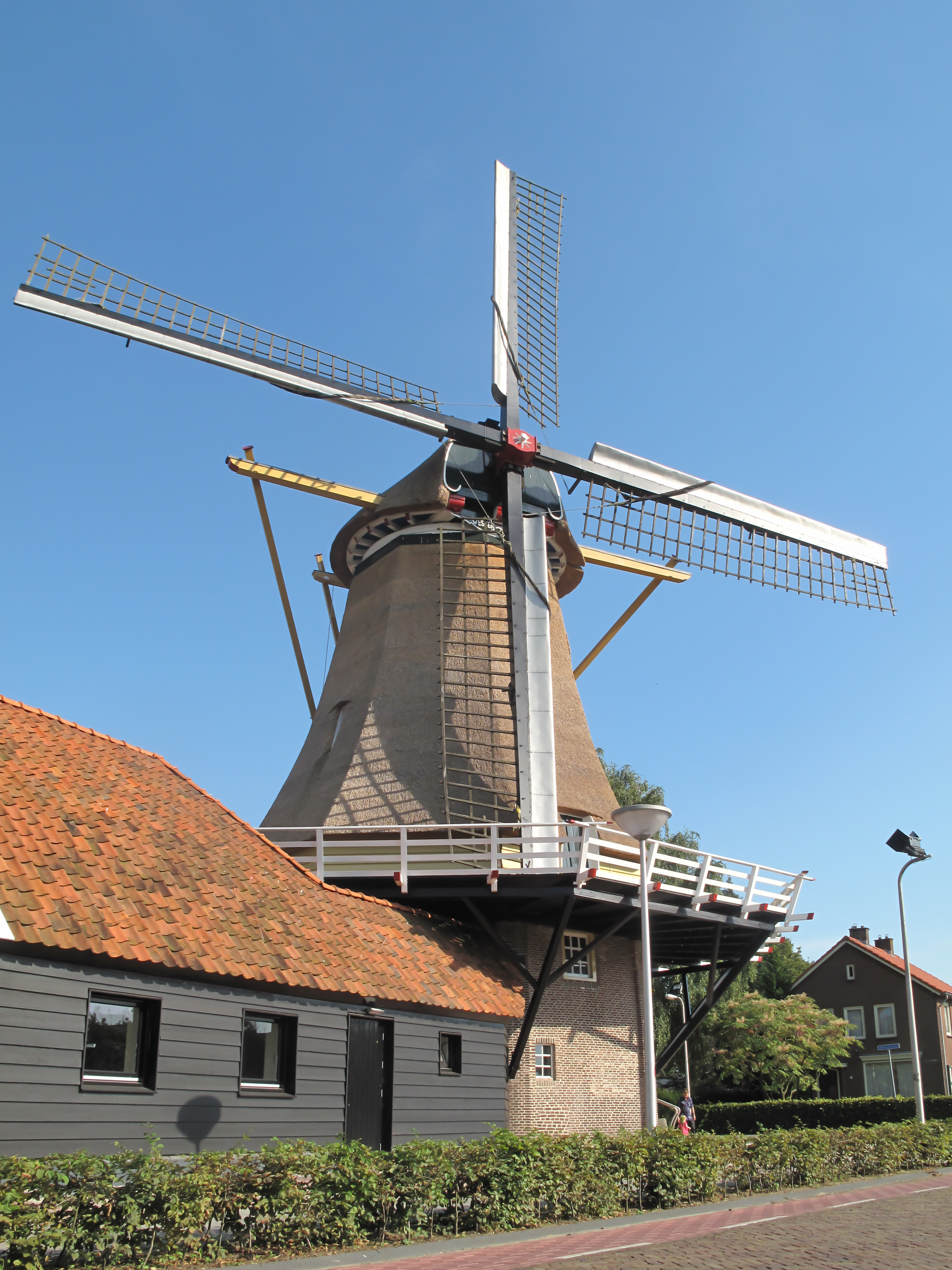
Dalfsen windmill

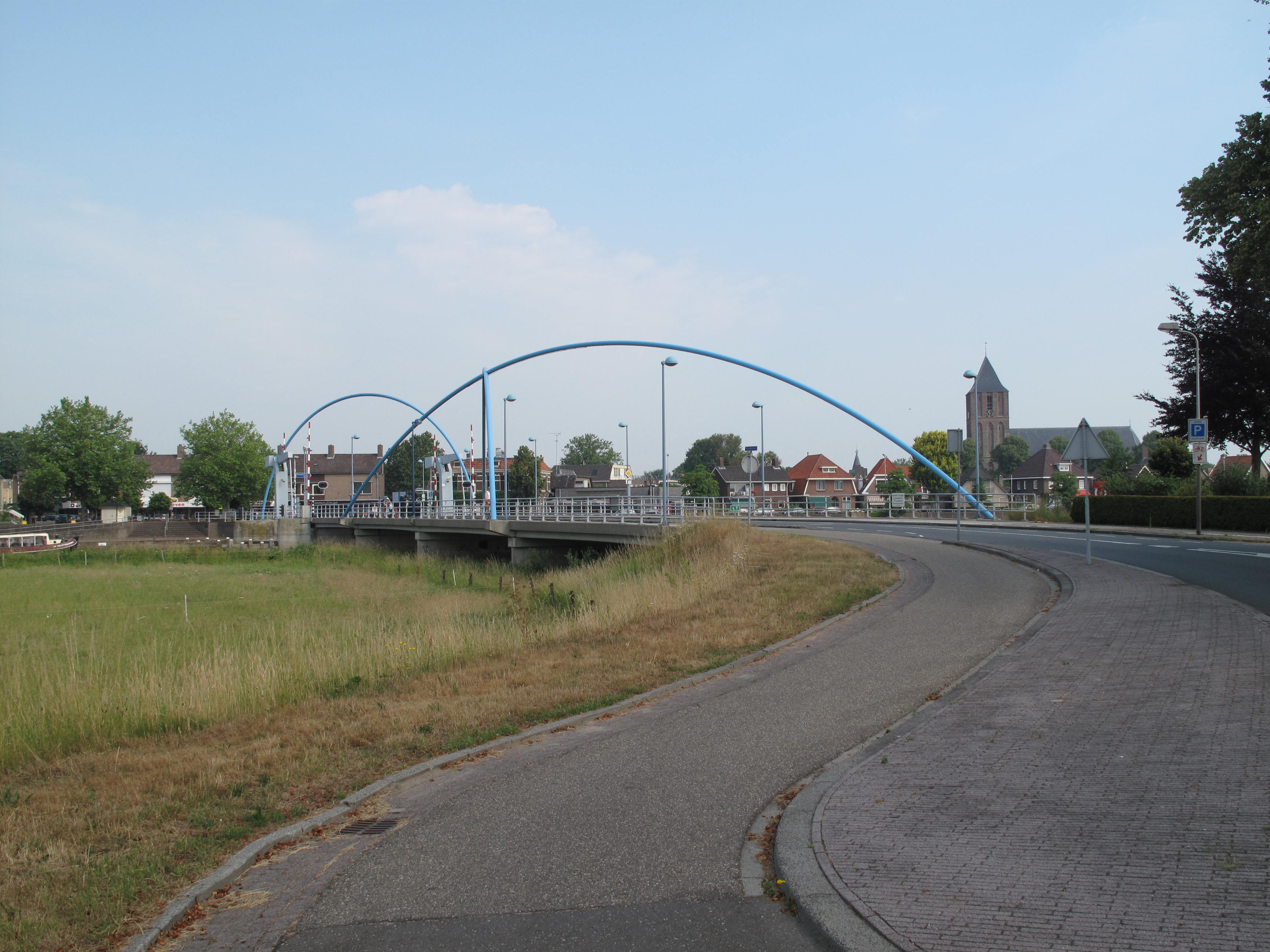
Dalfsen

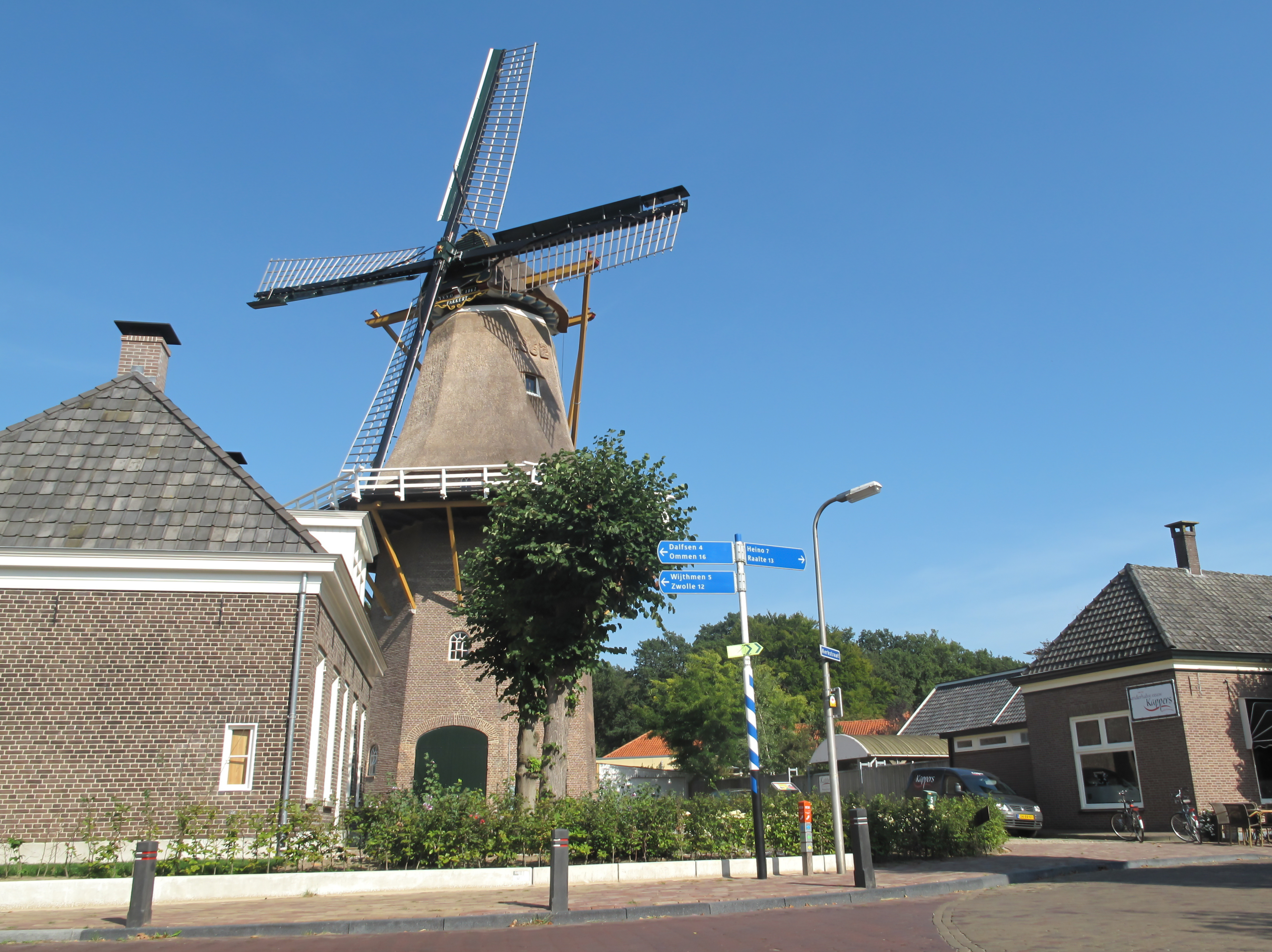
Hoonhorst windmill

== See also ==
- Dalfsen railway station
- Dalfsen train crash
