= 1668 in China =

- Decades: 1640s; 1650s; 1660s; 1670s; 1680s
- See also: Other events of 1668; History of China • Timeline • Years

Events from the year 1668 in China.

== Incumbents ==
- Kangxi Emperor (7th year)
  - Regents — Ebilun and Oboi

=== Viceroys ===
- Viceroy of Zhili, Shandong and Henan — Zhu Changzuo (–January 8), Bai Bingzhen (January 27–)
- Viceroy of Zhejiang — Zhao Tingchen
- Viceroy of Fujian — Zhang Chaolin
- Viceroy of Huguang — Zhang Changgeng, Liu Zhaoqi (Note: post is abolished and merged into authority of the Viceroy of Sichuan, with the combined name Viceroy of Chuan-Hu)
- Viceroy of Shan-Shaan — Moluo
- Viceroy of Liangguang — Zhou Youde, Jin Guangzu
- Viceroy of Yun-Gui — Bian Sanyuan, Gan Wenkun
- Viceroy of Sichuan (Chuan-Hu) — Liu Zhaoqi
- Viceroy of Liangjiang — Lang Tingzuo (– December 17)

== Events ==
- The Qing government decreed a prohibition of non-Eight Banner people getting into Northeast China. Han Chinese were banned from settling in this region but the rule was openly violated and Han Chinese became a majority in urban areas by the early 19th century.
- Tianhou Temple (Anping) built in Taiwan
- July 25 — 50,000+ killed in the 8.5 magnitude 1668 Tancheng earthquake in Shandong
- The contents of the national treasury totals 14,930,000 taels
- The Qing revoke the trading privileges of the Dutch
- The Imperial Edict banning footbinding is revoked when determined to be unenforceable
- Sino-Russian border conflicts

== Births ==
- Imperial Noble Consort Quehui (1668 – 24 April 1743), of the Manchu Bordered Yellow Banner Tunggiya clan, was a consort of the Kangxi Emperor

== Deaths ==
- Fang Weiyi (1585-1668, 方維儀) a Chinese poet, calligrapher, painter and literature historian
