= 1669 in China =

- Decades: 1640s; 1650s; 1660s; 1670s; 1680s
- See also: Other events of 1669; History of China • Timeline • Years

Events from the year 1669 in China.

== Incumbents ==
- Kangxi Emperor (8th year)
  - Regents — Oboi

=== Viceroys ===
- Viceroy of Zhili, Shandong and Henan — Bai Bingzhen (– July 28) (Note: post abolished until 1724)
- Viceroy of Zhejiang — Liu Zhaoqi
- Viceroy of Fujian — Zhang Chaolin
- Viceroy of Chuan-Hu — Liu Zhaoqi
- Viceroy of Shan-Shaan — Moluo
- Viceroy of Liangguang — Zhou Youde, Jin Guangzu
- Viceroy of Yun-Gui — Gan Wenkun
- Viceroy of Liangjiang — Maleji

== Events ==
- Kangxi deposes his regent Oboi with help of his grandmother Grand Dowager Empress Xiaozhuang, who had raised him, and has him executed. He takes full control of the empire from this point onward.
- a Chinese pharmaceutical company Tong Ren Tang (TRT; Chinese: 同仁堂) is founded in Beijing, which is now the largest producer of traditional Chinese medicine (TCM).
- In 1669, Lanbu (1642–1679), the third holder of the Prince Jingjin title, was demoted by the Kangxi Emperor from a qinwang (first-rank prince) to a feng'en zhenguo gong
- Chahar ruler Abunai showed disaffection with Manchu Qing rule, and is placed under house arrested in 1669 in Shenyang and the Kangxi Emperor gave his title to his son Borni
- poet, essayist, and art historian Zhou Lianggong holds a party at his Pavilion for Viewing Paintings in Nanjing. Later he is again accused of corruption
- Sino-Russian border conflicts

== Births ==
- Jiang Tingxi (simplified Chinese: 蒋廷锡; traditional Chinese: 蔣廷錫; pinyin: Jiǎng Tíngxí; Wade–Giles: Chiang T'ing-hsi, 1669–1732), courtesy name Yangsun (杨孙), was a Chinese painter, and an editor of the encyclopedia Complete Classics Collection of Ancient China.

== Deaths ==
- Yang Guangxian (Chinese: 楊光先, Xiao'erjing: ﻳْﺎ ﻗُﻮْا ﺷِﯿًﺎ) (1597–1669) a Chinese Muslim Confucian writer and astronomer who was the head of the Bureau of Astronomy (欽天監) from 1665 to 1669.
