= 1667 in China =

- Decades: 1640s; 1650s; 1660s; 1670s; 1680s
- See also: Other events of 1667; History of China • Timeline • Years

Events from the year 1667 in China.

== Incumbents ==
- Kangxi Emperor (6th year)
  - Regents — Sonin, Ebilun, Suksaha, and Oboi

=== Viceroys ===
- Viceroy of Zhili, Shandong and Henan — Zhu Changzuo (–January 8), Bai Bingzhen (January 27–)
- Viceroy of Zhejiang — Zhao Tingchen
- Viceroy of Fujian — Zhang Chaolin
- Viceroy of Huguang — Zhang Changgeng
- Viceroy of Shan-Shaan — Lu Chongjun
- Viceroy of Liangguang — Lu Xingzu
- Viceroy of Yun-Gui — Bian Sanyuan
- Viceroy of Sichuan — Miao Cheng
- Viceroy of Jiangnan — Lang Tingzuo

== Events ==
- Puti Temple or Bodhi Temple (Chinese: 菩提寺; pinyin: Pútí Sì), a Buddhist temple located in Mangshi of Dehong Dai and Jingpo Autonomous Prefecture is built in Yunnan province.
- China Illustrata, a book written by the Jesuit Athanasius Kircher (1602-1680) is published. It compiles the 17th century European knowledge on the Chinese Empire and its neighboring countries
- Imperial Regent Sonin died on 12 August 1667. His death provoked a series of changes in the regency: just as the other regents, led by Oboi, tried to consolidate their power, the Kangxi emperor vied to assert his own power.
- The imperial Deliberative Council investigates Suksaha after he retires as regent. Two days later on September 2, the Council ordered Suksaha and all his male kin arrested; on September 4, finding Suksaha guilty of twenty-four "grave crimes" and recommended that he and many of his male relatives be executed, along with many members of the imperial guard who had supposedly connived in Suksaha's schemes.
- Qing emissary Kong Yuanzhang is sent to Taiwan to convince Zheng Jing to surrender. Zheng refuses, citing prosperous trading conditions
- Russian former Qing soldier Gantimur, along with his relatives and forty elders of his tribe, went over to the Russians to seek an alliance. An immediate attempt made by the Qing authorities to secure his return by force was unsuccessful, and special envoys sent by order of the Kangxi Emperor were also unsuccessful persuading Gantimur to come back to the side of the Qing
- Ganlu Temple (Mount Jiuhua) originally built by an exceptional Chan master Dong'an (洞安)
- Wu Sangui submitted a request to the Kangxi Emperor, asking for permission to be relieved of his duties in Yunnan and Guizhou provinces, on the premise that he was ill, but Kangxi, not yet ready for a trial of strength with him, refused.
- Sino-Russian border conflicts
- Anhui province established

== Births ==
- Ye Tianshi (1667–1747) was a Chinese medical scholar who was the major proponent of the "school of warm diseases".

== Deaths ==
- Soni (索尼; 1601–1667), or Sonin, a Manchu of the Hešeri clan who served as one of the Four Regents
