= 1670 in China =

- Decades: 1650s; 1660s; 1670s; 1680s; 1690s
- See also: Other events of 1670; History of China • Timeline • Years

Events that occurred in the year 1670 in China.

== Incumbents ==
- Kangxi Emperor (9th year)

=== Viceroys ===
- Viceroy of Zhejiang — Zhao Tingchen
- Viceroy of Fujian — Liu Dou
- Viceroy of Chuan-Hu — Cai Yurong
- Viceroy of Shan-Shaan — Moluo
- Viceroy of Liangguang — Zhou Youde, Quan Guangzu
- Viceroy of Yun-Gui — Gan Wenkun
- Viceroy of Liangjiang — Maleji

== Events ==
- The Kangxi Emperor's Sacred Edict (聖諭) first issued. It consists of sixteen maxims, each seven characters long, to instruct the average citizen in the basic principles of Confucian orthodoxy
- Sino-Russian border conflicts
