= 1666 in China =

- Decades: 1640s; 1650s; 1660s; 1670s; 1680s
- See also: Other events of 1666; History of China • Timeline • Years

Events from the year 1666 in China.

== Incumbents ==
- Kangxi Emperor (5th year)
  - Regents — Sonin, Ebilun, Suksaha, and Oboi

=== Viceroys ===
- Viceroy of Zhili, Shandong and Henan — Zhu Changzuo
- Viceroy of Zhejiang — Zhao Tingchen
- Viceroy of Fujian — Zhu Changzuo
- Viceroy of Huguang — Zhang Changgeng
- Viceroy of Shaanxi — Bai Rumei
- Viceroy of Liangguang — Lu Xingzu
- Viceroy of Yun-Gui — Bian Sanyuan
- Viceroy of Sichuan — Li Guoying, Miao Cheng
- Viceroy of Jiangnan — Lang Tingzuo

== Events ==
- Zheng Jing's forces attack the Dutch at Keelung but are repulsed
- Sino-Russian border conflicts

== Births ==
- July 17, Cherbourg-en-Cotentin, France — Joseph Henri Marie de Prémare (1666 – 1736), Jesuit missionary, wrote the first important Chinese language grammar in a European language

== Deaths ==
- Jesuit missionary and astronomer Adam Schall von Bell dies in exile in Macau after release from prison. He was accused by Yang Guangxian of rebellion and miscalculating the funeral of Consort Donggo
- Fan Wencheng, early Han Chinese defector to the Qing dynasty
