= 1664 in China =

- Decades: 1640s; 1650s; 1660s; 1670s; 1680s
- See also: Other events of 1664; History of China • Timeline • Years

Events from the year 1664 in China. Also known as 癸卯年 (Water Rabbit) 4360 or 4300 to 甲辰年 (Wood Dragon) 4361 or 4301.

== Incumbents ==
- Kangxi Emperor (3rd year)
  - Regents — Sonin, Ebilun, Suksaha, and Oboi

=== Viceroys ===
- Viceroy of Zhili — Miao Cheng
- Viceroy of Min-Zhe — Zhao Tingchen
- Viceroy of Huguang — Zhang Changgeng
- Viceroy of Shaanxi — Bai Rumei
- Viceroy of Guangdong — Li Qifeng
- Viceroy of Yun-Gui — Zhao Tingchen
  - Viceroy of Guizhou — Tong Yannian, Yang Maoxun
  - Viceroy of Yunnan — Bian Sanyuan
- Viceroy of Sichuan — Li Guoying
- Viceroy of Jiangnan — Lang Tingzuo

== Events ==
- January — Dutch fleets return to Batavia after Qing-Dutch alliance fails
- Spring — Zheng Jing withdraws the last Zheng family forces on the mainland from Tongshan (桐山街道), Fujian
- After failing talk the Zheng family into peacefully surrendering, Dutch Captain Herman de Bitter defeats a fleet at Penghu in August and temporarily occupies Keelung harbor
- A planned Qing invasion of the Kingdom of Tungning led by Admiral Shi Lang and supported by the Dutch fleet in Taiwan fails to occur
- Ming loyalist Zheng Huangyan (張煌言) is executed in Hangzhou
- An imperial edict imposes another ban on footbinding
- Changsha becomes the capital of Hunan province, having been upgraded from a superior prefecture
- The British East India Company begins trade in China
- Jesuit missionary and astronomer Adam Schall von Bell is tried due to accusations by Yang Guangxian
- Sino-Russian border conflicts

== Births ==
- France — François Xavier d'Entrecolles (1664 – 1741); Chinese name: 殷弘绪, Yin Hongxu) a French Jesuit priest, who learned the Chinese technique of manufacturing porcelain through his investigations in China at Jingdezhen
