= 1665 in China =

- Decades: 1640s; 1650s; 1660s; 1670s; 1680s
- See also: Other events of 1665; History of China • Timeline • Years

Events from the year 1665 in China.

== Incumbents ==
- Kangxi Emperor (4th year)
  - Regents — Sonin, Ebilun, Suksaha, and Oboi

=== Viceroys ===
- Viceroy of Zhili — Miao Cheng (to July 4)
  - Viceroy of Zhili, Shandong and Henan — Zhu Changzuo (July 13 –)
- Viceroy of Zhejiang — Zhao Tingchen
- Viceroy of Fujian — Zhu Changzuo
- Viceroy of Huguang — Zhang Changgeng
- Viceroy of Shaanxi — Bai Rumei
- Viceroy of Guangdong — Li Qifeng (Note: authority transferred to Viceroy of Liangguang)
- Viceroy of Guangxi — Qu Jinmei (Note: authority transferred to Viceroy of Liangguang)
- Viceroy of Liangguang — Lu Xingzu (Note: office consolidated from Guangdong and Guangxi Viceroities)
- Viceroy of Yun-Gui — Bian Sanyuan (Note: office consolidated from Yunnan and Guizhou Viceroities)
- Viceroy of Sichuan — Li Guoying
- Viceroy of Jiangnan — Lang Tingzuo

== Events ==
- October or November — Kangxi Emperor marries Lady Hešeri, granddaughter of his regent Sonin and she becomes Empress Xiaochengren
- Another planned Qing invasion of the Kingdom of Tungning fails to occur due to a typhoon
- An embassy from the East-India Company, a Dutch-language account of China by Johan Nieuhof is published. The book served as a major influence in the rise of chinoiserie in the early eighteenth century
- Sino-Russian border conflicts
