= 1661 in China =

- Decades: 1640s; 1650s; 1660s; 1670s; 1680s
- See also: Other events of 1661; History of China • Timeline • Years

Events from the year 1661 in the Qing dynasty.

== Incumbents ==
- Shunzhi Emperor (17th year)
- Kangxi Emperor
  - Regents — Sonin, Ebilun, Suksaha, and Oboi

=== Viceroys ===
- Viceroy of Zhili — Miao Cheng
- Viceroy of Min-Zhe — Zhao Guozuo, Zhao Tingchen
- Viceroy of Huguang — Zhang Changgeng
- Viceroy of Shaan-Chuan (Note: the office changed its name to "Viceroy of Shaanxi" (陝西總督) and Sichuan was removed from its jurisdiction) — Bai Rumei
- Viceroy of Guangdong — Li Qifeng
  - Viceroy of Guangxi (Note: post existed from 1661–1665) — Yu Shiyue
- Viceroy of Yun-Gui — Zhao Tingchen
  - Viceroy of Guizhou — Tong Yannian, Yang Maoxun
  - Viceroy of Yunnan — Bian Sanyuan
- Viceroy of Sichuan — Li Guoying
- Viceroy of Liangjiang/Jiangnan — Lang Tingzuo
- Viceroy of Jiangxi — Zhang Chaolin (Note: split off from Viceroy of Liangjiang)

== Events ==
- Shunzhi Emperor dies, probably of smallpox. The seven-year-old Kangxi Emperor ascends the throne and the Four Regents, previously nominated in Shunzhi's will, begin rule as regents.
  - The Thirteen Offices are eliminated (and eunuch Wu Liangfu executed) by Oboi and the other regents in March 1661.
- March — Koxinga's fleet set sail from Kinmen with hundreds of junks of various sizes, with roughly 25,000 soldiers and sailors aboard. They arrived at Penghu the next day and attack Dutch forces shortly after
  - On March 30, the Siege of Fort Zeelandia on the Taiwan main island begins
- Khagan of Northern Yuan dynasty Ejei Khan dies and is succeeded by his brother Abunai, who shows disaffection with Manchu Qing rule
- Sino-Russian border conflicts

== Deaths ==
- Ejei Khan, (? – 1662) the son of Ligdan Khan, the last in the Borjigin clan of Mongol Khans, who once established the Mongol Empire in the 13th century. Northern Yuan dynasty, existed as remnants of the Yuan dynasty, ended a few years after
