= 1779 in China =

- Decades: 1750s; 1760s; 1770s; 1780s; 1790s
- See also: Other events of 1779; History of China • Timeline • Years

Events from the year 1779 in China.

== Incumbents ==
- Qianlong Emperor

=== Viceroys ===
- Viceroy of Zhili — Zhou Yuanli then Yang Jingsu
- Viceroy of Min-Zhe — Yang Jingsu then Sanbao
- Viceroy of Huguang — Sanbao then Tuside then Fulehun
- Viceroy of Shaan-Gan — Lergiyen
- Viceroy of Liangguang — Guilin
- Viceroy of Yun-Gui — Li Shiyao
- Viceroy of Sichuan — Wenshou
- Viceroy of Liangjiang — Gao Jin then Sazai

== Births ==
- Tao Zhu

== Deaths ==
- Yu Minzhong
- Fang Wanyi
