= 1663 in China =

- Decades: 1640s; 1650s; 1660s; 1670s; 1680s
- See also: Other events of 1663; History of China • Timeline • Years

Events from the year 1663 in China. Also known as 壬寅 (Water Tiger) 4359 or 4299 to 卯年 (Water Rabbit) 4360 or 4300 in the Earthly Branches calendar.

== Incumbents ==
- Kangxi Emperor (2nd year)
  - Regents — Sonin, Ebilun, Suksaha, and Oboi

=== Viceroys ===
- Viceroy of Zhili — Miao Cheng
- Viceroy of Min-Zhe — Zhao Tingchen
- Viceroy of Huguang — Zhang Changgeng
- Viceroy of Shaanxi — Bai Rumei
- Viceroy of Guangdong — Li Qifeng
- Viceroy of Yun-Gui — Zhao Tingchen
  - Viceroy of Guizhou — Tong Yannian, Yang Maoxun
  - Viceroy of Yunnan — Bian Sanyuan
- Viceroy of Sichuan — Li Guoying
- Viceroy of Jiangnan — Lang Tingzuo

== Events ==
- Kinmen in Fujian is captured by Qing dynasty forces from Ming dynasty loyalists.
- Zhuang Tinglong case — a criminal case concerning an unauthorised history of the Ming dynasty and unflattering depiction of the Qing dynasty concludes. Thousands of people who were involved or implicated in the case were rounded up at a military camp in Hangzhou, where they were sentenced. Over 70 people were condemned to death
- Dafo Temple, a Buddhist temple in Guangzhou is rebuilt and expanded by Shang Kexi. The building has been devastated by years of war and neglect
- Kaifeng Jews build a stele and an eight Hall of Scriptures
- Koxinga Ancestral Shrine built by Zheng Jing in modern-day Tainan, Taiwan to worship his father Koxinga
- Geng Jimao and Balthasar Bort lead a joint Qing-Dutch attack on Zheng family forces in Kinmen and Xiamen
- The lifting of an especially strict haijin policy implemented by the Qing in 1661, where the entire coastal population of Fujian, and parts of Guangdong and Zhejiang provinces is moved twenty miles inland. Thousands die in the ordeal.
- Sino-Russian border conflicts

== Births ==
- Wu Shifan (1663-1681), son of Wu Sangui and ruler of Zhou

== Deaths ==
- March 20 — Empress Xiaokangzhang, (孝康章皇后; 1638 – 1663) a consort of the Shunzhi Emperor
- Hong Ren (弘仁; 1610–1663) an early Qing painter and a member of the Anhui (or Xin'an) school of painting
