= 1671 in China =

- Decades: 1650s; 1660s; 1670s; 1680s; 1690s
- See also: Other events of 1671; History of China • Timeline • Years

Events from the year 1671 in China.

== Incumbents ==
- Kangxi Emperor (10th year)

=== Viceroys ===
- Viceroy of Zhejiang — Zhao Tingchen
- Viceroy of Fujian — Liu Dou
- Viceroy of Chuan-Hu — Cai Yurong
- Viceroy of Shan-Shaan — Luoduo
- Viceroy of Liangguang — Zhou Youde, Quan Guangzu
- Viceroy of Yun-Gui — Gan Wenkun
- Viceroy of Liangjiang — Maleji

== Events ==
- Because poor, marginal lands were exempted from the annual land tax, and the Qing court rewarded officials who could induce people to expand cultivated land. Therefore, the Viceroy of Chuan-Hu, Cai Yurong, observed that “there is an abundance of cultivated land in Szechwan, but there are not enough people to cultivate it,” the throne decreed that “those who were willing to settle in Szechwan were to be tax-exempt for a period of five years and that any local official who could attract three hundred immigrants would be promoted immediately. (See 湖廣填四川)
- Sino-Russian border conflicts

== Deaths ==
- Geng Jimao, Ming-turned-Qing general
