= 1662 in China =

- Decades: 1640s; 1650s; 1660s; 1670s; 1680s
- See also: Other events of 1662; History of China • Timeline • Years

Events from the year 1662 in China.

== Incumbents ==
- Kangxi Emperor (1st year)
  - Regents — Sonin, Ebilun, Suksaha, and Oboi

=== Viceroys ===
- Viceroy of Zhili — Miao Cheng
- Viceroy of Min-Zhe — Zhao Tingchen
- Viceroy of Huguang — Zhang Changgeng
- Viceroy of Shaanxi — Bai Rumei
- Viceroy of Guangdong — Li Qifeng
- Viceroy of Yun-Gui — Zhao Tingchen
  - Viceroy of Guizhou — Tong Yannian, Yang Maoxun
  - Viceroy of Yunnan — Bian Sanyuan
- Viceroy of Sichuan — Li Guoying
- Viceroy of Jiangnan — Lang Tingzuo

== Events ==
- February 1 — Siege of Fort Zeelandia concludes with Dutch forces in Taiwan surrendering to Zheng Chenggong (Koxinga)
- February 18 — The Kangxi era begins with the start of the following Lunar Year
- Spring — the regents ordered a Great Clearance in southern China that evacuated the entire population from the seacoast to counter a resistance movement started by Ming loyalists under the leadership of Taiwan-based Ming general Koxinga, also known as Zheng Chenggong
- June 1 — Zhu Youlang, the Yongli Emperor of Southern Ming, is captured in killed by forces led by Wu Sangui, while in Toungoo dynasty-ruled Burma. The last of the Ming dynasty pretenders have been defeated.
- June 23 — Koxinga dies in Anping, Taiwan of Malaria, his son Zheng Jing takes over the Zheng regime, later leading the remaining 7,000 Ming loyalist troops to Taiwan
- An imperial edict banning footbinding is put in place. This is the first one imposed on all of China
- For his efforts defeating Ming loyalist forces, Wu Sangui is rewarded with the title of Pingxi Wang (平西王; translated as "Prince Who Pacifies the West" or "King Who Pacifies the West") with a fief in Yunnan by the Qing imperial court, Guizhou is added to his domain later that year
- Kaifeng repopulated after most residents are killed in the devastating 1642 man-made flood designed to lift the siege from Li Zicheng’s rebel forces
- Sino-Russian border conflicts

== Births ==
- Shanxi — Cao Ji Wu (曹繼武, 1662-1722), a master of the internal martial art of Xinyi (Heart and Intention Boxing), precursor of Xingyi (Form and Intention Boxing)
- Xiamen — Zheng Kezang (鄭克𡒉 1662-1681), the crown prince and regency of Kingdom of Tungning. Kezhang was the eldest son of Zheng Jing and Chen Zhao-niang, and his grandparents were Koxinga and Princess Dong
- Tian Wenjing (田文鏡; 1662 – 1732), styled Yiguang (抑光), a prominent mandarin who lived during the reign of the Kangxi and Yongzheng Emperors of the Qing Dynasty

== Deaths ==
- June 23 — Koxinga (國姓爺), Zheng Chenggong (鄭成功), Prince of Yanping (1624 – 1662), was a Chinese Ming loyalist who resisted the Qing conquest of China in the 17th century, fighting them on China's southeastern coast
- Ji Jike (姬際可, 1588–1662) — a highly accomplished martial artist from Yongji, Shanxi Province. Also known as Ji Longfeng (姬龍峰), he is widely considered to be the originator of the internal martial art of Xingyiquan
- Empress Xiaogangkuang (died 1662) — a Chinese Empress consort of the Southern Ming Dynasty, empress to the Yongli Emperor
- Li Dingguo (李定國, 1621 – 1662) — a military general who fought for the Southern Ming against the Qing Dynasty
- Zhu Yihai (朱以海, 1618–1662) — ruled as the Gengyin Emperor (庚寅) of the Southern Ming Dynasty from reigning from 1645 to 1655
