= 1681 in China =

- Decades: 1660s; 1670s; 1680s; 1690s; 1700s
- See also: Other events of 1681; History of China • Timeline • Years

Events from the year 1681 in China.

== Incumbents ==
- Kangxi Emperor (20th year)

== Events ==
- The Revolt of the Three Feudatories concludes
  - Qing general Zhao Liangdong proposes a three-pronged attack on Yunnan, with imperial armies from Hunan, Guangxi and Sichuan. Cai Yurong, Viceroy of Yun-Gui, led the attack on the rebels together with Zhang Tai and Laita Giyesu, conquering Mount Wuhua and besieging Kunming.
  - In October, Zhao Liandong's army was the first to break through into Kunming and the others followed suit, swiftly capturing the city.
  - In December, Wu Shifan commits suicide and the rebels surrendered the following day.
- Zheng Jing dies, is succeeded by his son Zheng Kezang, as regency of Kingdom of Tungning. However, Kezhang was killed by his uncle Zheng Cong in Coup of Tungning (東寧之變), and Princess Chen, Zheng's princess consort, committed suicide later. Zheng did not have any children.
- Sino-Russian border conflicts

== Births ==
- Empress Xiaojingxian (28 June 1681 – 29 October 1731), of the Manchu Plain Yellow Banner Ula Nara clan, personal name Duoqimuli, was a consort of the Yongzheng Emperor. She was three years his junior.

== Deaths ==
- Queen Dong (17 October 1623 – 30 July 1681), birth name Dong You, posthumous name Chaowu Wangfei, was the princess consort of Koxinga and mother of Zheng Jing
- Wang Fuchen (Chinese: 王辅臣) (d. 1681) a participant in the Revolt of the Three Feudatories during the Qing Dynasty against the Kangxi Emperor from Shanxi
- Zheng Kezang (1662 - 1681), was the crown prince and regency of Kingdom of Tungning. Kezhang was the eldest son of Zheng Jing and Chen Zhao-niang, and his grandparents were Koxinga and Princess Dong. In 1681, after Zheng Jing died, Kezhang was killed by his uncle Zheng Cong in Coup of Tungning (東寧之變), and Princess Chen, Zheng's princess consort, committed suicide later. Zheng did not have any children.
