= 1675 in China =

- Decades: 1650s; 1660s; 1670s; 1680s; 1690s
- See also: Other events of 1675; History of China • Timeline • Years

Events from the year 1675 in China.

== Incumbents ==
- Kangxi Emperor (14th year)

== Events ==
- The Revolt of the Three Feudatories continues
  - Tuhai defeated Wang Fuchen in Pingliang, Gansu, and Wang Qiang fell.
- Chahar prince Abunai and his brother Lubuzung revolt against the Qing in 1675 along with 3,000 Chahar Mongol followers. On April 20, 1675, Qing forces defeat the Chahar and kill Abunai and all his followers. Their title was abolished, all Chahar Mongol royal males were executed even if they were born to Manchu Qing princesses, and all Chahar Mongol royal females were sold into slavery except the Manchu Qing princesses. The Chahar Mongols were then put under the direct control of the Qing Emperor unlike the other Inner Mongol leagues which maintained their autonomy.
- Kangxi's son Yunreng named Crown Prince
- Sino-Russian border conflicts

== Deaths ==
- Wei Zhouzuo (衛周祚, 1612–1675), courtesy name Wenxi (simplified Chinese: 文锡; traditional Chinese: 文錫; pinyin: Wénxī), art name Wenshi (simplified Chinese: 闻石; traditional Chinese: 聞石; pinyin: Wénshí), was an official who served in the late Ming dynasty and early Qing dynasty.
- Sun Qifeng (1583–1675; 孫奇逢; Sun Ch'i-feng in Wade Giles) a native of Rongcheng County in Zhili Province. He passed the imperial examination for xiucai
- Mishan (米思翰; 1633–1675), served as the Minister of Revenue from 1669 to 1675, Grandfather of Empress Xiaoxianchun, consort to the Qianlong Emperor
- Burni, (1650-1675) Prince of the Chahar Mongols and son of Abunai
