= Artai =

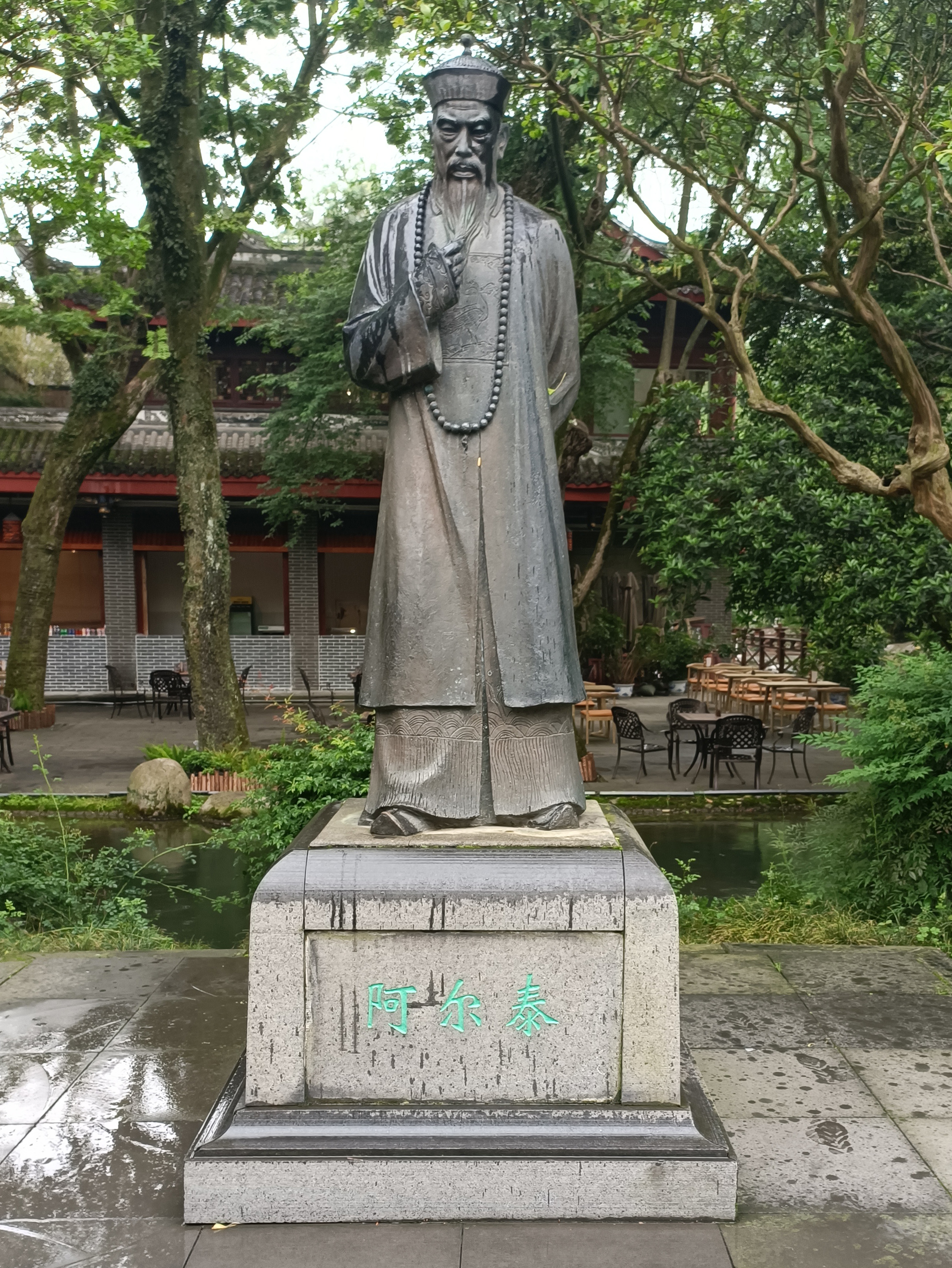
Statue of Artai in Dujiangyan, Sichuan, commemorating his contributions to water conservancy

Artai (Manchu: ᠠᡵᡨ᠋ᠠᡳ, romanized: Artai; 1696 – 5 February 1773) was a Manchu official and military commander of the Irgen Gioro clan and the Plain Yellow Banner during the reign of the Qianlong Emperor. He served as Governor of Shandong (山東巡撫), Viceroy of Sichuan, Viceroy of Huguang, and Grand Secretary of the Wuying Hall (武英殿大學士). During the Second Jinchuan Campaign, he was appointed grand general and commander-in-chief (定邊大將軍) of the Qing armies, but was later dismissed and sentenced to commit suicide.

== Biography ==
Artai began his career as a clerk in the Imperial Clan Court (宗人府) and promoted through multiple provincial appointments. As Governor of Shandong, he gained recognition for his flood-control and hydraulic works. Appointed Viceroy of Sichuan in 1763, he promoted transportation infrastructure, river conservancy projects, and frontier grain-storage systems.

During the Second Jinchuan Campaign, Artai initially favored a conciliatory policy toward the Tusi (土司, local chieftains), a strategy that failed to satisfy the Qianlong Emperor. In 1772, although appointed commander-in-chief, he was removed from his posts after disagreements over military strategy. He subsequently remained with the army to supervise logistics, but was blamed for supply shortages and administrative failures. Accusations of corruption further damaged his standing, and in 1773 he was convicted and ordered by the Qianlong Emperor to commit suicide.
