= 1680 in China =

- Decades: 1660s; 1670s; 1680s; 1690s; 1700s
- See also: Other events of 1680; History of China • Timeline • Years

Events from the year 1680 in China.

== Incumbents ==
- Kangxi Emperor (19th year)

== Events ==
- The Revolt of the Three Feudatories continues.
  - Sichuan and southern Shaanxi were retaken by the Han Chinese Green Standard Army under Wang Jinbao and Zhao Liangdong in 1680, with Manchu forces involved only in dealing with logistics and provisions, not combat.
  - the provinces of Hunan, Guizhou, Guangxi, were also recovered by the Qing
  - Wu Shifan retreated to Kunming in October
  - Shang Zhixin was forced to commit suicide in 1680; of his thirty six brothers four were executed when he committed suicide while the rest of his family was allowed to live
  - Zheng Jing's forces were defeated near Xiamen in 1680 and forced to withdraw to Taiwan.
- The Dzungar conquest of Altishahr resulted in the Tibetan Buddhist Dzungar Khanate in Dzungaria conquering and subjugating the Genghisid-ruled Chagatai Khanate in Altishahr (the Tarim Basin). It put a final end to the independence of the Chagatai Khanate
- Sino-Russian border conflicts

== Deaths ==
- Fu Honglie (傅弘烈; died AD 1680) was a native of Jiangxi, who gave his allegiance to the Manchus in 1657 and was employed as a Prefect, executed by Wu Shifan
- July 24 — Candida Xu (1607–1680) a Chinese Catholic. She has been called "arguably the most influential Chinese Christian woman of the seventeenth century."
- Shang Zhixin, (1636–1680) a major figure in the early Qing Dynasty, known for his role in the Revolt of the Three Feudatories. He was Prince of Pingnan (平南王, "Prince who Pacifies the South"), inheriting his position from his father, the surrendered Ming Dynasty general Shang Kexi
- Wang Shimin (王時敏; 1592–1680) was a Chinese landscape painter during the late Ming Dynasty and early Qing Dynasty (1644–1911)
- Zhou Youde (周有德); courtesy name Yichu (彝初; Yíchú), was a Chinese official active in the early Qing dynasty as governor of various provinces
- Li Yu, (李漁; Lǐ Yú; 1610–1680 AD), also known as Li Liweng, was a Chinese playwright, novelist and publisher
