= 1682 in China =

- Decades: 1660s; 1670s; 1680s; 1690s; 1700s
- See also: Other events of 1682; History of China • Timeline • Years

Events from the year 1682 in China.

== Incumbents ==
- Kangxi Emperor (21st year)

== Events ==
- The Tibetan desi (regent) Sangye Gyatso concealed the death of the 5th Dalai Lama in 1682, and only informed the emperor in 1697
- The official Qing account of the Revolt of the Three Feudatories, entitled P’ing-ting san-ni fang-lüeh, compiled by Ledehun, Han T’an, and others, begins
- Sino-Russian border conflicts

== Deaths ==
- Zhu Zhiyu (Chinese: 朱之瑜; 1600–1682), courtesy name Luyu (魯璵), and commonly known as Zhu Shunshui (朱舜水; romaji: Shu Shunsui) in Japan, was one of the greatest scholars of Confucianism in the Ming dynasty and Edo Japan. Zhu remains the best remembered of the Ming political refugees in Tokugawa Japan and the one who contributed most to Japanese education and intellectual history.
