= Hongfu Temple (Guiyang) =

Buddhist temple on Mount Qianling in Guizhou, China

- 弘福寺
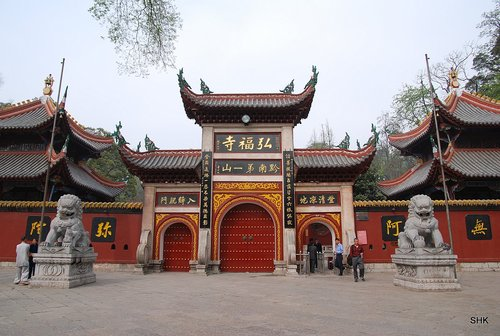
- The Shanmen at Hongfu Temple.

- Location within Guizhou

Religion
- Affiliation: Buddhism
- Sect: Linji school
- Leadership: Shi Xinzhao (释心照)

Location
- Location: Yunyan District, Guiyang, Guizhou
- Country: China
- Interactive map of Hongfu Temple
- Coordinates: 26°36′00″N 106°41′55″E

Architecture
- Style: Chinese architecture
- Founder: Chisong (赤松)
- Established: 1672
- Completed: 1672

Hongfu Temple (Chinese: 弘福寺; pinyin: Hóngfú Sì) is a Buddhist temple located on Mount Qianling, in Yunyan District of Guiyang, Guizhou, China. Hongfu Temple and Qixia Temple are collectively known as the "Two Attractions in Guiyang".

== Name ==
"Hongfu" (弘福) in Chinese literally means developing Buddha's spirit and benefiting the mankind.

== History ==
The temple was originally built in 1672, eleventh year of the Kangxi Emperor, by monk Chisong (赤松), under the Qing dynasty (1644–1911). After the death of Chisong, his disciple Zhai Mai (翟脉) succeeded as the abbot. In 1739, in the 4th year of Qianlong period, the Qing government bestowed a set of Chinese Buddhist canon on the temple.

In 1929, Buddhist monk Guoyao (果瑶) founded the "Guizhou Buddhist College" in the temple.

After the PRC's founding, Master Huaiyi (怀一) served as abbot of Hongfu Temple. During the ten-year devastating Cultural Revolution, the temple was dilapidated with huge losses of the cultural relics and encountered massive destruction.

After the 3rd Plenary Session of the 11th Central Committee of the Chinese Communist Party in 1983, Hongfu Temple was designated as a National Key Buddhist Temple in Han Chinese Area by the State Council of China.

On July 28, 1987, the government transferred the management rights to the temple.

== Architecture ==
Now the existing main buildings include the Shanmen, Four Heavenly Kings Hall, Mahavira Hall, Hall of Guanyin, Hall of Maitreya, Buddhist Texts Library, and Pilu Pavilion (毗卢阁).

=== Shanmen ===
Under the eaves of the Shanmen is a plaque with the Chinese characters "Hongfu Temple" written by the former president of the Buddhist Association of China Zhao Puchu. A pair of Chinese guardian lions stands on both sides of the Shanmen.

=== Bell tower ===
A biggest copper bell is stored in the Bell tower. The 1,500-kilogram (3,300 lb) copper bell was cast in 1469 during the mid-Ming dynasty (1368–1644).

=== Four Heavenly Kings Hall ===
Mi Le is enshrined in the Hall of Heavenly Kings. Four Heavenly Kings' statues are enshrined in the left and right side of the hall.

=== Hall of Guanyin ===
The statue of 32 Armed Guanyin is enshrined in the Hall of Guanyin, 32 arms represent 32 incarnation of Guanyin. At the back of Guanyin is a statue of Weituo.

=== Mahavira Hall ===
The Mahavira Hall enshrining the Three Saints of Huayan (华严三圣). In the middle is Shijiamouni, statues of Wenshu and Puxian stand on the left and right sides of Shijiamouni's statue. In front of Shijiamouni stand Ananda and Kassapa Buddha on the left and right. The statues of Eighteen Arhats stand on both sides of the hall.

=== Jade Buddha Hall ===
The Jade Buddha Hall houses a sitting jade statue of Shijiamouni Buddha, which is 1.5 metres (4 ft 11 in) high, 1.2 metres (3 ft 11 in) wide and weighing 900 kilograms (2,000 lb). The statue came from Yangon, Myanmar.
