= 1683 in China =

- Decades: 1660s; 1670s; 1680s; 1690s; 1700s
- See also: Other events of 1683; History of China • Timeline • Years

Events from the year 1683 in China.

== Incumbents ==
- Kangxi Emperor (22nd year)

== Events ==
- The Qing conquest of Taiwan
  - The naval forces of the Ming loyalists on Taiwan—organized under the Zheng dynasty as the Kingdom of Tungning—were defeated off Penghu by 300-odd ships under the Qing admiral Shi Lang. Koxinga's grandson Zheng Keshuang surrendered Tungning a few days later and Taiwan became part of the Qing Empire. Zheng Keshuang moved to Beijing, joined the Qing nobility as the "Duke Haicheng" (海澄公), and was inducted into the Eight Banners as a member of the Han Plain Red Banner
  - the Qing sent most of the 17 Ming princes, including Prince Zhu Shugui of Ningjing and Prince Honghuan (w:zh:朱弘桓), the son of Zhu Yihai, still living on Taiwan back to mainland China, where they spent the rest of their lives. The Prince of Ningjing and his five concubines, however, committed suicide rather than submit to capture. Their palace was used as Shi Lang's headquarters in 1683, but he memorialized the emperor to convert it into a Mazu temple as a propaganda measure in quieting remaining resistance on Taiwan. The emperor approved its dedication as the Grand Matsu Temple the next year and, honoring the goddess Mazu for her supposed assistance during the Qing invasion, promoted her to "Empress of Heaven" (Tianhou) from her previous status as a "heavenly consort" (tianfei).
  - The end of the rebel stronghold and capture of the Ming princes allowed the Kangxi Emperor to relax the Sea Ban and permit resettlement of the Fujian and Guangdong coasts. The financial and other incentives to new settlers particularly drew the Hakka, who would have continuous low-level conflict with the returning Punti people for the next few centuries.
- Sino-Russian border conflicts

== Births ==
- Sun Jiagan (Chinese: 孫嘉淦, 1683–1753) was a Chinese politician of the Qing dynasty
- 28 November — Yun'e (1683–1741), born Yin'e, was a Manchu prince of the Qing dynasty of China. He was a relatively unremarkable prince who was primarily known to be a crony of his older brother Yunsi.
- Yuntang (1683–1726), born Yintang, was a Manchu prince of the Qing dynasty. He was the ninth son of the Kangxi Emperor and an ally of his eighth brother Yunsi, who was the main rival to their fourth brother Yinzhen in the power struggle over the succession. In 1722, Yinzhen succeeded their father and became historically known as the Yongzheng Emperor, after which he started purging his former rivals. In 1725, the Yongzheng Emperor stripped Yuntang off his beizi title, banished him from the Aisin Gioro clan, and imprisoned him in Baoding. Yuntang died under mysterious circumstances later. In 1778, the Qianlong Emperor, who succeeded the Yongzheng Emperor, posthumously rehabilitated Yuntang and restored him to the Aisin Gioro clan.

== Deaths ==
- July 21 — Zhu Shugui (朱術桂, 1617 – 1683 ), courtesy name Tianqiu and art name Yiyuanzi, formally known as the Prince of Ningjing, was a Ming dynasty prince and the last of the pretenders to the Ming throne after the fall of the Ming Empire
- October 3 — Lü Liuliang (Chinese: 呂留良; 1629–1683) was a Han Chinese poet and author from Tongxiang, Zhejiang province. He was a noted anti-Qing activist and target of a literary inquisition
- Tao Runai (Chinese: 陶汝鼐; 1601 – 1683), courtesy name Zhongtiao (仲調) and Xieyou (燮友), art name Mi'an (密庵) and Shixinong (石溪農), dharma name Rentoutuo (忍头陀), was a Chinese official, scholar, calligrapher and Buddhist monk who resisted the Qing conquest of China in the 17th century. He spent most of his life during the Manchu conquest of China and anti-Qing activities after the Ming dynasty had been overthrown.
- Yao Qisheng (simplified Chinese: 姚启圣; traditional Chinese: 姚啟聖; pinyin: Yáo Qǐshèng; 1624–1683), courtesy name Xizhi (Chinese: 熙止; pinyin: Xīzhǐ), was a regional official, diplomat, and statesman during the reign of the Kangxi Emperor in Qing Dynasty China. Yao was a pivotal figure in the Qing empire's annexation of Taiwan.
