= 1677 in China =

- Decades: 1650s; 1660s; 1670s; 1680s; 1690s
- See also: Other events of 1677; History of China • Timeline • Years

Events from the year 1677 in China.

== Incumbents ==
- Kangxi Emperor (16th year)

== Events ==
- The Revolt of the Three Feudatories continues
  - The Qing writes to the Emperor of the Le dynasty in Dai Viet for help in putting down the rebellion
- Establishment of the Southern Study (Chinese: Nánshūfáng, 南書房); an institution considered to be the predecessor to the Grand Council that held the highest policy-making power after its establishment. It was abolished in 1898. The Southern Study was built by the Kangxi Emperor in the southwestern corner of the Palace of Heavenly Purity. Members of the Hanlin Academy, selected on the basis of literary merit, were posted to the Study so that the Emperor had easy access to them when he sought counsel or discussion
- Sino-Russian border conflicts

== Deaths ==
- Wang Jian (simplified Chinese: 王鉴; traditional Chinese: 王鑒; pinyin: Wáng Jiàn; Wade–Giles: Wang Jian); ca. 1598-1677 was a Chinese landscape painter during the Ming dynasty and Qing dynasty
- Pan Pingge (Chinese: 潘平格; pinyin: Pān Pínggé; 1610–1677), was a notable Chinese philosopher during the late-Ming and early-Qing period who studied Cheng-Zhu, Lu-Wang, and Buddhist philosophy (especially the Zen buddhism)
- Kelden Gyatso (Kalden Gyatso, Kelden Repa, Tibetan: སྐལ་ལྡན་རྒྱ་མཚོ, Wylie: Skal ldan rgya mtsho) (1607-1677) was a 17th-century Tibetan poet, scholar, and siddha
