= 1820 in China =

- Decades: 1800s; 1810s; 1820s; 1830s; 1840s
- See also: Other events of 1820; History of China • Timeline • Years

Events from the year 1820 in China.

== Incumbents ==
- Jiaqing Emperor (25th year)

== Events ==
- April 1 — Benjamin Chew Wilcocks becomes Consul of the United States at the Port of Canton
- September — Jiaqing Emperor died suddenly of unknown causes. Mianning inherited the throne at the age of 38, becoming the Daoguang Emperor. He became the first Qing emperor who was the eldest legitimate son of his father
