= 1672 in China =

- Decades: 1650s; 1660s; 1670s; 1680s; 1690s
- See also: Other events of 1672; History of China • Timeline • Years

Events from the year 1672 in China.

== Incumbents ==
- Kangxi Emperor (11th year)

== Events ==
- Hongfu Temple (Guiyang) (弘福寺; Hóngfú Sì) a Buddhist temple located on Mount Qianling, in Yunyan District of Guiyang, Guizhou, is first built
- Sino-Russian border conflicts

== Births ==
- March 12 — Yunzhi, Prince Zhi (1672 – 1735), also known as Yunzhi, formally known as Prince Zhi of the Second Rank between 1698 and 1708, a Manchu prince of the Qing dynasty
- October 29 — Zhang Tingyu (張廷玉 1672 – 1755) Han Chinese politician and historian who lived in the Qing dynasty serving the Kangxi, Yongzheng and Qianlong emperors

== Deaths ==
- Lu Shiyi, (b. 1611) Confucian scholar
- Zhou Lianggong, (b. 1612) artist, writer, and official serving Ming and Qing dynasties
