= 1679 in China =

- Decades: 1650s; 1660s; 1670s; 1680s; 1690s
- See also: Other events of 1679; History of China • Timeline • Years

Events from the year 1679 in China.

== Incumbents ==
- Kangxi Emperor (18th year)

== Events ==
- The Revolt of the Three Feudatories continues
- A special examination for admission into the Hanlin Academy is held, the Emperor chooses as the topic a rhyme-prose (fu) on the xuanzhi and yuheng, instruments that were then thought to be part of the astronomical system used by the ancient sage-kings to chart the skies
- Building of the Ganden Sumtseling Monastery, a Tibetan Buddhist monastery near Zhongdian at elevation 3,380 metres (11,090 ft) in Yunnan province
- 1679 Sanhe-Pinggu earthquake, a major quake that struck the Zhili (Greater Beijing) region in Qing China on the morning of September 2, 1679. It is the largest recorded surface rupture event to have occurred in the North China Plain
- The Dzungar conquest of Altishahr resulted in the Tibetan Buddhist Dzungar Khanate in Dzungaria conquering and subjugating the Genghisid-ruled Chagatai Khanate in Altishahr (the Tarim Basin). It put a final end to the independence of the Chagatai Khanate
- Sino-Russian border conflicts

== Births ==
- November 15 — Arcadio Huang (born Xinghua, modern Putian, in Fujian, 1679–1716), a Chinese Christian convert, brought to Paris by the Missions étrangères. He took a pioneering role in the teaching of the Chinese language in France around 1715
