= 1674 in China =

- Decades: 1650s; 1660s; 1670s; 1680s; 1690s
- See also: Other events of 1674; History of China • Timeline • Years

Events from the year 1674 in China.

== Incumbents ==
- Kangxi Emperor (13th year)

== Events ==
- The Revolt of the Three Feudatories continues
  - January — Wu Sangui captures Guizhou
  - Geng Jingzhong declares a rebellion in Fujian, forces Fujian Governor General Fan Chengmo to commit suicide
  - Zheng Jing, ruler of the Kingdom of Tungning, leads a 150,000 strong army from Taiwan and lands in Fujian to join the rebel forces
- Sino-Russian border conflicts

== Births ==
- Yunreng (6 June 1674 – 27 January 1725), born Yinreng, a Manchu prince of the Qing dynasty. He was the second among the Kangxi Emperor's sons to survive into adulthood and was designated as Crown Prince for two terms between 1675 and 1712 before being deposed

== Deaths ==
- Fan Chengmo, Governor of Fujian
- Wu Yingxiong and his sons with Princess Jianning, executed due to his father Wu Sangui's rebellion
