= 1676 in China =

- Decades: 1650s; 1660s; 1670s; 1680s; 1690s
- See also: Other events of 1676; History of China • Timeline • Years

Events from the year 1676 in China.

== Incumbents ==
- Kangxi Emperor (15th year)

== Events ==
- The Revolt of the Three Feudatories continues
  - Geng Jingzhong surrenders to the Qing, has his title Prince of Jingnan restored and pledges to fight the other revolting feudatories.
  - Shang Zhixin revolts against the Qing, placing Guangdong under his rule and moving his troops north into Jiangxi
- Sino-Russian border conflicts
