= 1678 in China =

- Decades: 1650s; 1660s; 1670s; 1680s; 1690s
- See also: Other events of 1678; History of China • Timeline • Years

Events from the year 1678 in China.

== Incumbents ==
- Kangxi Emperor (17th year)

== Events ==
- The Revolt of the Three Feudatories continues
  - Wu Sangui declares himself Emperor of Zhou. A few months later he dies of apparent natural causes on October 2, his grandson Wu Shifan continues the rebellion.
- Sino-Russian border conflicts

== Deaths ==
- Wu Sangui
