= 1821 in China =

- Decades: 1800s; 1810s; 1820s; 1830s; 1840s
- See also: Other events of 1821; History of China • Timeline • Years

Events from the year 1821 in China.

== Incumbents ==
- Daoguang Emperor (1st year)

== Events ==
- Ruan Yuan, Governor General of Liangguang, expanded the Guangdong Gong Yuan examination hall to more than seven thousand six hundred examination cells
