= 1673 in China =

- Decades: 1650s; 1660s; 1670s; 1680s; 1690s
- See also: Other events of 1673; History of China • Timeline • Years

Events from the year 1673 in China.

== Incumbents ==
- Kangxi Emperor (12th year)

== Events ==
- Prince of Pingnan Shang Kexi, ill and of old age, inquires if he might be allowed to retire from his fiefdom and retire back to Manchuria
  - Kangxi leaped at the chance and graciously gave his permission
- December — The Revolt of the Three Feudatories broke out in 1673 when Wu Sangui's forces, based in his fiefdom in Yunnan, overran most of southwest China and he tried to ally himself with local generals such as Wang Fuchen. He declares his intent to restore the Ming dynasty
  - 1673, Wu's forces captured Hunan and Sichuan provinces
  - Wu Sangui ends his connection to the Qing dynasty and declares the Zhou dynasty. An Emperor is not named, implying that an heir to the Ming dynasty will become emperor.
- Sino-Russian border conflicts

== Deaths ==
- Zhu Guozhi, Governor of Yunnan
