= 1822 in China =

- Decades: 1800s; 1810s; 1820s; 1830s; 1840s
- See also: Other events of 1822; History of China • Timeline • Years

Events from the year 1822 in China.

== Incumbents ==
- Daoguang Emperor (2nd year)

== Events ==
- The teaching and practice of acupuncture and moxibustion were banned from the Imperial Medical Academy (Taiyuyuan)
