= 1659 in China =

- Decades: 1630s; 1640s; 1650s; 1660s; 1670s
- See also: Other events of 1659; History of China • Timeline • Years

Events from the year 1659 in the Qing dynasty.

== Events ==
- At the behest of Hong Chengchou, the Qing court grants Wu Sangui own fiefdom, effectively gaining all civilian and military control in Yunnan province.
