= Puti Temple =

Buddhist temple in Yunnan, China

- 菩提寺
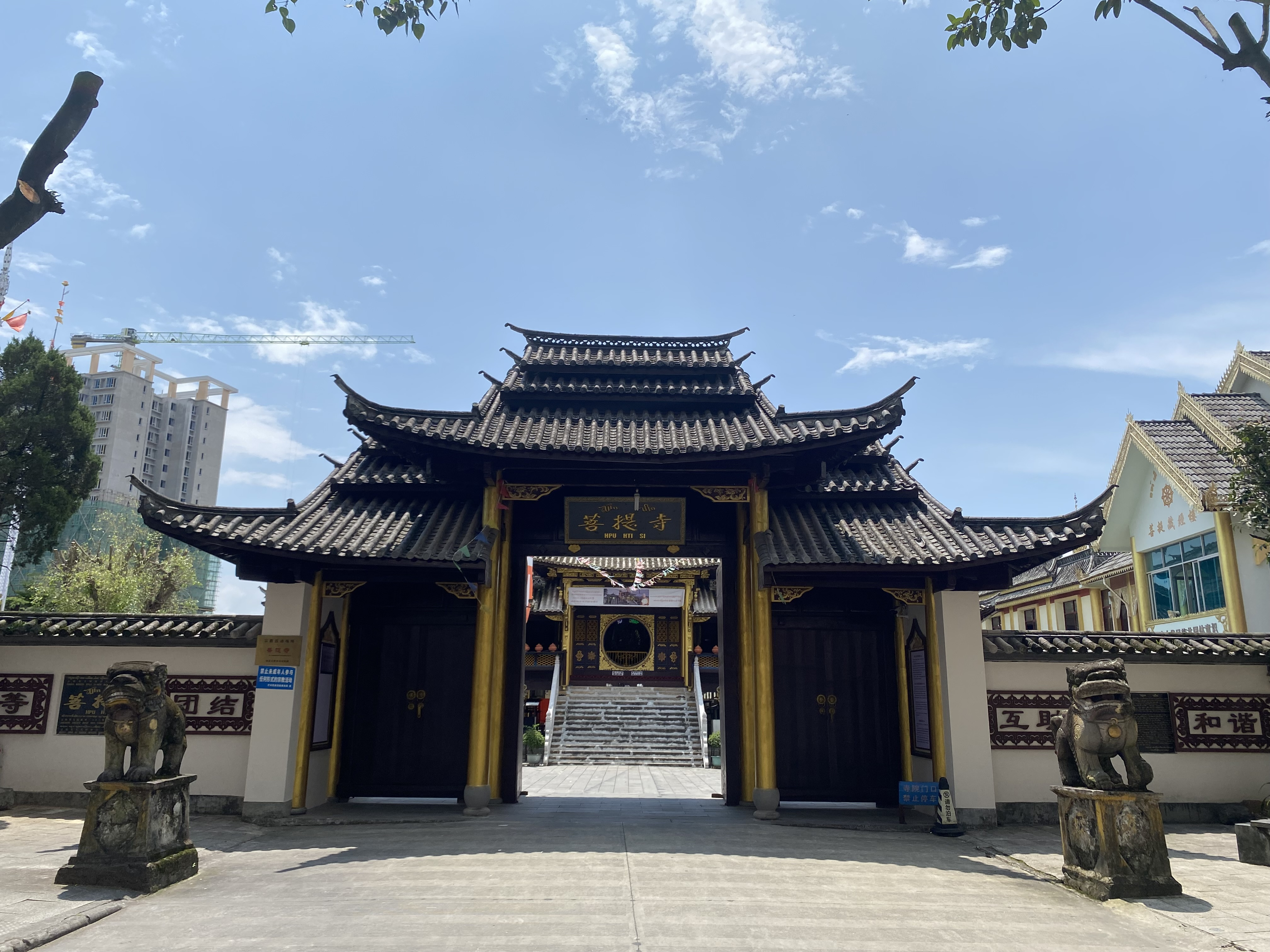

- Location on Yunnan. Puti Temple (China)

Religion
- Affiliation: Buddhism
- District: Mangshi
- Prefecture: Dehong Dai and Jingpo Autonomous Prefecture
- Province: Yunnan
- Deity: Theravada

Location
- Country: China
- Prefecture: Dehong Dai and Jingpo Autonomous Prefecture
- Coordinates: 24°26′35″N 98°35′39″E

Architecture
- Style: Chinese architecture
- Established: 1667

Puti Temple or Bodhi Temple (Chinese: 菩提寺; pinyin: Pútí Sì; Tai Nüa: ᥓᥩᥒᥰ ᥔᥦᥒᥴ / Cöng Séhng) is a Buddhist temple located in Mangshi of Dehong Dai and Jingpo Autonomous Prefecture, Yunnan, China. In Tai Nüa language, the temple is called Cöng Séhng, meaning Temple of Precious Stone. Covering an area of 3,125-square-metre (0.772-acre), the temple was established in 1667. Because of war and natural disasters, the temple has been rebuilt numerous times in the past 300 years.

== History ==
Puti Temple was first built in 1667, in the 6th year of Kangxi period (1661–1722) in the Qing dynasty (1644–1911). The temple was named "Bodhi Temple" by master Dengci (等慈法师). The temple is named Puti (Bodhi) Temple because it has a big Bodhi tree. In the Yongzheng period (1723-1735), Yongzheng Emperor (1678–1735) inscribed a plaque with the Chinese characters "佛光普照" (佛光普照 means Buddhism lights illuminate everywhere) and bestowed it on the temple.

In 1942, during the Second Sino-Japanese War, the Japanese air force made an air strike on Mangshi, the temple was devastated by war and a fire consumed the Bodhi tree.

In 1950, the temple was demolished in a fire. From 1953 to 1956, the local people rebuilt the temple. In 1978, the local government renovated the temple.

== Architecture ==
=== Main Hall ===
The main hall is a place-style roof wooden building is 14-metre (46 ft) high and consists of three parts, namely the roof truss, roof ridge and hall pinnacle. With the wooden-structured roof truss, the main hall has 12 large columns which penetrate through the floor to the beams and form the top frame. The smaller wood columns on both sides support the side room formed by auxiliary beams, making the main hall more spacious. The integrates the hip and gable roof (歇山顶) of Han Chinese and stilt wooden style (干栏式) of Dai people, which shows dedicated and unique design.

In the middle of the main hall, a 3-metre (9.8 ft) high statue of Sakyamuni is sitting on a lotus throne. The niches on both sides of the statue enshrine several dozens of Buddha statues with various shapes. On both sides of the main hall there are two stone legendary animals called Gaduo (嘎朵) which shoulder the responsibilities of guarding the main hall.
