= Sun Qifeng =

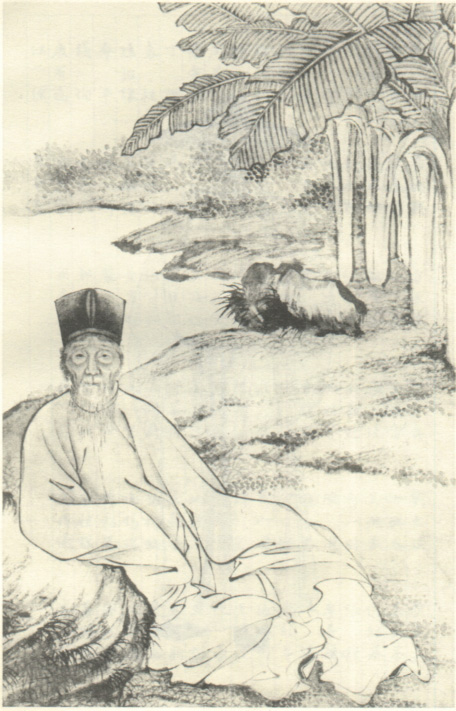
Sun Qifeng depicted in Qingdai Xuezhe Xiangzhuan (清代學者象傳), a collection of portraits of Qing dynasty scholars

Sun Qifeng (1583–1675; 孫奇逢; Sūn Qíféng or Sun Ch'i-feng in Wade Giles) was an official who served the Ming Dynasty. He was a native of Rongcheng County in Zhili Province. He passed the imperial examination for xiucai when only thirteen years of age, and graduated as juren in 1600; but disgusted with the prospects of the Ming dynasty, clouded by the development of eunuch dominion, he devoted himself to a life of study and retirement. Often invited to take office by Emperors both of the Ming and Qing dynasties, he ever steadfastly declined; though in 1636 he did take part in the successful defence of Roncheng against Li Zicheng. He is one of the most famous masters of Confucian ethics, and his works on the Four Books etc. have been recommended to students by Zhang Zhidong in the 19th century. He also wrote on Ceremonial, and published the lives of eleven famous Confucians. He taught in a college near Suzhou during the last twenty-five years of his life, and in 1828 he was admitted into the Confucian Temple.
