= Ye Tianshi =

Chinese medical scholar

- 葉天士
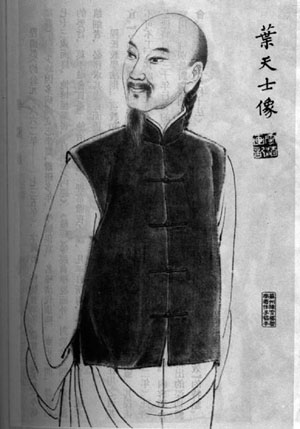
- Portrait of Ye Tianshi.
- Born: 1667
- Died: 1747 (aged 79–80)
- Occupation: Physician
- Era: Qing dynasty

Ye Tianshi (1667–1747) was a Chinese medical scholar who was the major proponent of the "school of warm diseases". His major work, Wen-re Lun (Discussion of Warm Diseases) published in 1746, divided the manifestations of diseases into four stages: wei (defensive phase), qi (qi-phase), ying (nutrient-phase), and xue (blood-phase).

== Life ==
Ye Tianshi was born in 1666. His father as well as his grandfather, Ye Shi, were also physicians. He learned medicine from his father and, following his father's death, from his father's pupil of the surname Zhu.

== Work ==
Ye Tianshi wrote little and most works attributed to him were compiled by his followers after his death. He is best known for proposing that feverish diseases progressed along four stages, a theory he laid out in his book Discussion of Warm Diseases. Those stages are wei (defensive phase), qi (qi-phase or active qian phase), ying (nutrient-phase), and xue (blood-phase). The characteristics of wei are fever, sensitivity to cold, headache, and rapid pulse. Next qi is the phase of most active disease, characterized by high fever, sweating, dry mouth, and rapid pulse. Ying is characterized by rising fever at night, agitation, confusion, and weak pulse. Finally, xue consists of agitation, rash, and in some cases vomiting of blood or blood in the stool or urine. In his treatments for feverish diseases, Ye recommended cooling substances.
