= Wang Fuchen =

Wang Fuchen (Chinese: 王輔臣; pinyin: Wáng Fǔchén; d. 1681) was a participant in the Revolt of the Three Feudatories during the Qing dynasty against the Kangxi Emperor. Wang was born in Datong, Shanxi Province, he was born to a poor family and grew up to be a bandit. His original surname was Li, nicknamed Horse-Sparrowhawk (馬鷂子) by the Manchu soldiers. Originally resisting the Manchu conquest of the Ming dynasty, ancient historians left behind records stating that Wang Fuchen was a handsome, tall and strong man with pale face, and thick eyebrows that resembled reclining silkworms. He was famous for his valour in battle and was known to the Manchus as a tough opponent, his presence was sometimes discouraging enough for the Manchu soldiers to retreat. He was highly regarded by Shunzhi Emperor and was won over to the Regent Dorgon. He assisted the former Ming dynasty generals Hong Chengchou and Wu Sangui in suppressing the Ming remnants of the Southern Ming. He followed Wu to Burma to capture and execute Zhu Youlang, Prince of Gui, the last Ming claimant on the mainland. He was made provincial military commander of Shaanxi, which at the time also included modern-day Gansu province. From his seat at Pingliang, he revolted in coordination with Wu by assassinating Moro, Qing's commander in chief of Shaanxi and Shanxi, and quickly captured Lanzhou. In 1665 he was defeated by Manchu Bannerman Tuhai at Pingliang. With Geng Jingzhong of Fujian, he surrendered in June 1676. He committed suicide by drinking poison.
