= Yang Guangxian =

Chinese writer and astronomer

Yang Guangxian (Chinese: 楊光先, 1597–1669) was a Confucian writer and astronomer who was the head of the Bureau of Astronomy (欽天監) from 1665 to 1669.

== Biography ==
Yang Guangxian was an assistant guard commander (Chinese: 副千戶; pinyin: fu qianhu) of the Xinanwei (新安卫) in Southern Zhili during the late Ming period. In 1637, he went to Beijing and then tried to advance himself by charging other people with criminal acts, or blackmailing them. When he tried this against Grand Secretary Wen Tiren (溫體仁), he was exiled to Liaoxi (遼西), where he stayed until the end of the Ming Dynasty in 1644. In Liaoxi, he learned astrology and fortunetelling.

Upon his return to Beijing, his new skills in astrology made it possible for him to pose as an astronomer, which gave him entrance into the higher circles. But the highest positions for astronomers were all taken by Jesuits. In 1659, he wrote On Collecting Errors (Chinese: 摘謬論; pinyin: Zhaimiu Lun), a criticism of the Western calendar. He also wrote his first attack on Christianity, On Exposing Heterodoxy (Chinese: 辟邪論; pinyin: Bixie Lun). But his first direct attack on the leading Jesuit astronomer of the court, Johann Adam Schall von Bell, appeared in 1660, when he sent A Call to Rectify the Country (Chinese: 正國體呈稿; pinyin: Zheng guoti cheng gao) to the Board of Rites (禮部), claiming that they wanted to Westernize the Chinese calendar. It was rejected.

More writings followed over the next few years. These were collected in 1665 as I Cannot Do Otherwise (Chinese: 不得已; pinyin: Budeyi). The most important of these articles appeared in September 1664: A Complaint Requesting Punishment for the Evil Religion (Chinese: 請誅邪教狀; pinyin: Qing zhu xiejiao zhuang). This time, it was accepted by the Board of Rites. In it, he claimed that Schall was responsible for the death of Consort Donggo in 1660 by choosing an inauspicious day for the burial of her son in 1658. Schall suffered a stroke during the investigations and had to be supported by the Flemish Jesuit Ferdinand Verbiest.

In April 1665, Schall and seven of his Chinese assistants were found guilty and sentenced to death. Eventually, only five Christian Chinese were executed: all Christian missionaries were exiled to Macau instead, with only the four Jesuits remaining in Beijing. Adam Schall, who died in 1666, would not live long enough to see the ban lifted in 1671.

Yang Guangxian became the head of the Chinese Bureau of Astronomy (欽天監監正). He took possession of the Jesuit compound in Xuanwumen, ordering the Chinese translations of western science books to be burned along with religious statues, and turning the church into a hall with his own picture hung over the main altar. In 1668, however, he was removed from the post and replaced again by the Flemish Jesuit Ferdinand Verbiest, because he could not produce a valid calendar during a competition with the Jesuit astronomers. The previous case against the Jesuits was reinvestigated and all findings were reversed. Yang was sentenced to death, only to be exiled to his native village due to his old age. He died the next year during his journey home.

== Notes ==
- Chu, Pingyi. 1997. “Scientific Dispute in the Imperial Court: The 1664 Calendar Case”. Chinese Science, no. 14. International Society for the History of East Asian Science, Technology, and Medicine: 7–34. https://www.jstor.org/stable/43290406.
- Hummel, Arthur W. Sr., ed. (1943). "Yang Kuang-hsien" . Eminent Chinese of the Ch'ing Period. United States Government Printing Office.
