= Moro (Irgen Gioro) =

Moro (Manchu: ᠮᠣᡵᠣ, romanized: Moro; d. 1674) was a Qing statesman and military commander of the Irgen Gioro clan (also Ayan Gioro clan) of the Manchu Plain Red Banner. His great-grandfather Wenca from Hunehe entered the service of the House of Aisin Gioro during the time when Nurhaci began his conquest. Moro eventually rose to become Grand Secretary of the Wuying Hall, Imperial Commissioner for Shaanxi (陝西經略), and the commander in charge of both Shaanxi and Shanxi troops in the early period of the Revolt of the Three Feudatories.

== Biography ==
In 1650, Moro was appointed Assistant Judicial Commissioner in the Ministry of Justice. He subsequently served as Director in the Ministry of Works, Left Vice Inspector-in-Chief, and Governor-General of Shanxi and Shaanxi. During his tenure as governor-general, a severe famine struck Shaanxi, causing widespread tax arrears and severe hardship among the population. Moro memorialized the throne requesting tax reductions and undertook reforms to curb abuses associated with surtaxes and various supplementary levies.

In 1669, after the downfall of the regent Oboi, officials petitioned the court to dismiss and investigate Moro for alleged association with Oboi. However, Kangxi Emperor held Moro in high regard and initially believed he should remain in office. Nevertheless, the following year Moro was forced to resign because of his involvement in the affair. In response, Liu Doutong (劉斗同), Governor of Gansu, together with the commanders Zhang Yong (張勇), Bai Yongfu (柏永馥), and Sun Sike (孫思克), submitted memorials praising Moro's integrity and benevolent administration and requesting his reinstatement. Thousands of residents of Xi'an also gathered outside government offices and jointly petitioned for his return, describing him as “upright and impartial in office, beloved by all the people.” The Kangxi Emperor subsequently exempted him from punishment and soon promoted him to Minister of Justice (刑部尚書).

In 1674, following the outbreak of the Revolt of the Three Feudatories, the Kangxi Emperor appointed Moro Imperial Commissioner for Shaanxi and concurrently Grand Secretary of the Wuying Hall. Although already serving as Minister of Justice, he was also entrusted with the duties of Minister of War (兵部尚書) and was granted an imperial seal conferring extraordinary authority. He received full command over the military forces of Shaanxi and Shanxi including Prince Donggo (董額), Imperial Duke Chokto (绰克讬), and other commanders in preparation for operations against Sichuan. Moro first deployed troops against the forces of Zheng Jiaolin (鄭蛟麟) at Guangyuan in Sichuan. He then repelled an attack on Ningqiang by Zheng's subordinate He Decheng (何德成) and stationed Wang Fuchen (王輔臣) there as commander. Before long, however, another rebel officer, Peng Shiheng (彭時亨), cut Qing supply lines by land and water. As a result, Qing's main effort at Guangyuan went two months without provisions or military pay. The army of Wang Huaizhong (王懐忠) disbanded, while Wang Fuchen himself began to contemplate rebellion. Particularly, Wang had already been in conflict with Moro over troop deployment and military strategy in previous occasions.

In the twelfth month of that year, Moro arrived at Ningqiang to prepare for the southward advance of the main army. His headquarters stood about one kilometer from Wang Fuchen's location. Before the arrival of the main echelons, Wang incited his troops to demand military pay and used the disturbance as a pretext to launch a surprise assault on Moro's camp. Moro personally directed the defense and successfully defeated the first wave of the enemy assault. Wang then attacked again with larger forces after reorganizing his troops. During the fierce battle, an arrow struck in Moro's neck and killed him in action. In 1683, Moro was posthumously awarded the honorific title Zhongmin (忠愍, “Loyal and Compassionate”) and granted the hereditary noble rank of tuwašara hafan in addition to baitalabure hafan (騎都尉兼一雲騎尉). The title was inherited by his second son, Chang'an (常安). The Kangxi Emperor personally composed the “Stele Inscription for Grand Secretary Moro” (大學士莫洛碑文), which was installed at his tomb.
