= Viceroy of Huguang =

Regional viceroy in Qing Empire

Chinese name
- Traditional Chinese: 湖廣總督
- Simplified Chinese: 湖广总督
Transcriptions
Standard Mandarin
- Hanyu Pinyin: Húguǎng Zǒngdū

Governor-General of Hubei, Hunan and Other Local Areas, in Charge of Military Affairs, Food and Wages and Governor Affairs (full title)
- Traditional Chinese: 總督湖北湖南等處地方提督軍務、糧饟兼巡撫事
- Simplified Chinese: 总督湖北湖南等处地方提督军务、粮饷兼巡抚事
Transcriptions
Standard Mandarin
- Hanyu Pinyin: Zǒngdū húběi húnán děng chǔ dìfāng tídū jūnwù, liáng xiǎng jiān xúnfǔ shì

Manchu name
- Manchu script: ᡥᡡᡤᡠᠸᠠᠩ ᠨᡳ ᡠᡥᡝᡵᡳ ᡴᠠᡩᠠᠯᠠᡵᠠ ᠠᠮᠪᠠᠨ
- Romanization: hūguwang ni uheri kadalara amban

Jurisdiction of the Viceroy of Huguang in 1911

The Viceroy of Huguang, fully in Chinese as the Governor-General of Hubei, Hunan and Other Local Areas, in Charge of Military Affairs, Food and Wages and Governor Affairs, was one of eight regional Viceroys during the Qing dynasty. The Viceroy of Huguang had jurisdiction of military, civil, and political affairs over then Hubei Province and then Hunan Province (approx. nowadays Hubei and Hunan).

== History ==
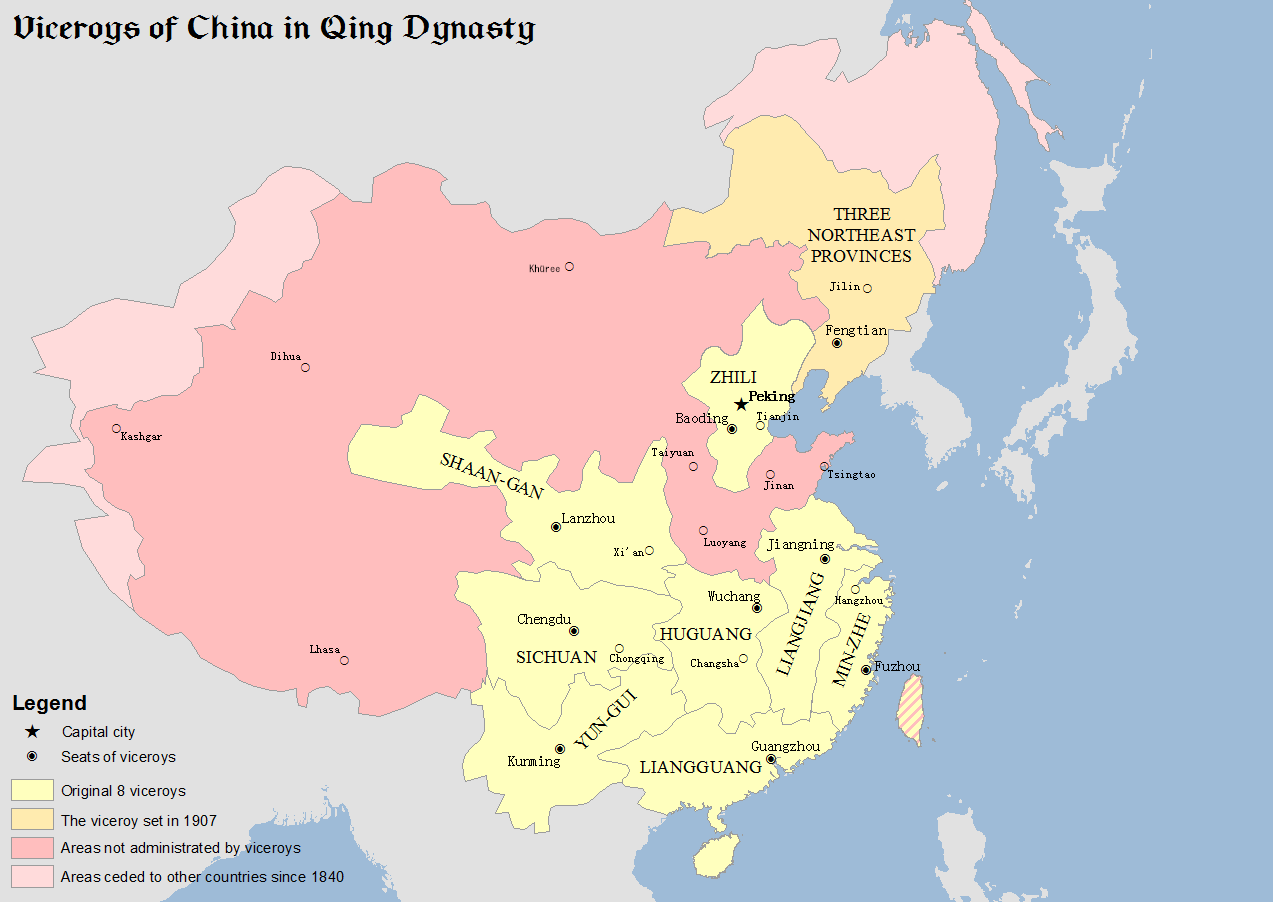
Map of viceroys in Qing Dynasty of China

The office was created in 1644 as the "Viceroy of Huguang" during the reign of the Shunzhi Emperor. Its headquarters were in Wuchang (present-day Wuchang District, Wuhan, Hubei). It was abolished in 1668 during the reign of the Kangxi Emperor but was restored in 1670 as the "Viceroy of Chuan-Hu" (川湖總督; "Viceroy of (Si)chuan and Hu(guang)"), with its headquarters in Chongqing. In 1674, the office of Viceroy of Chuan-Hu was split into the Viceroy of Sichuan and Viceroy of Huguang, and had remained as such until 1904. In 1904, during the reign of the Guangxu Emperor, the office of Provincial Governor of Hubei was merged into the office of Viceroy of Huguang.

== List of Viceroys of Huguang ==
#	Name	Portrait	Start of term	End of term	Notes
Viceroy of Huguang (1645–1904)
1	Luo Xiujin 羅繡錦		1645	1652	As Viceroy of Huguang and Sichuan
2	Zu Zeyuan 祖澤遠		1652	1656	
3	Hong Chengchou 洪承疇		1653	1658	As Viceroy of Huguang, Liangguang and Yun-Gui
4	Hu Quancai 胡全才		1656	1656	
5	Li Zuyin 李祖蔭		1656	1660	
6	Zhang Changgeng 張長庚		1660	1668	
7	Liu Zhaoqi 劉兆麒		1668	1669	As Viceroy of Chuan-Hu
8	Cai Yurong 蔡毓榮		1670	1682	As Viceroy of Chuan-Hu
9	Dong Weiguo 董衛國		1682	1684	
10	Xu Guoxiang 徐國相		1684	1688	
11	Ding Sikong 丁思孔		1688	1694	
12	Wu Tian 吳琠		1694	1696	
13	Li Huizu 李輝祖		1696	1699	
14	Guo Xiu 郭琇		1699	1703	
	Nian Xialing 年遐齡		1701	1704	Acting Viceroy
15	Yu Chenglong 喻成龍		1703	1705	
16	Shi Wensheng 石文晟		1705	1707	
17	Guo Shilong 郭世隆		1707	1710	
18	Ehai 鄂海		1710	1713	
19	Elunte 額倫特		1713	1716	
20	Mampi 滿丕		1716	1722	
21	Yang Zongren 楊宗仁		1722	1725	
22	Li Chenglong 李成龍		1725	1726	
23	Yi Zhaoxiong 宜兆熊		1726	1726	
24	Fumin 福敏		1726	1727	
25	Maizhu 邁柱		1727	1735	
26	Zhang Guangsi 張廣泗		1735	1735	
27	Shi Yizhi 史貽直		1735	1737	
28	Depei 德沛		1737	1739	
29	Bandi 班第		1739	1740	
30	Nasutu 那蘇圖		1740	1741	
31	Sun Jiagan 孫嘉淦		1741	1743	
32	Arsai 阿爾賽		1743	1744	
33	Omida 鄂彌達		1744	1746	
34	Saileng'e 賽楞額		1746	1748	
35	Xinzhu 新柱		1748	1749	
36	Yongxing 永興		1749	1750	
37	Arigun 阿里袞		1750	1751	
38	Yongchang 永常		1751	1753	
39	Kaitai 開泰		1753	1755	
40	Šose 碩色		1755	1759	
41	Suchang 蘇昌		1759	1761	
42	Aibida 愛必達		1761	1763	
	Chen Hongmou 陳宏謀		1763	1763	Acting Viceroy
43	Li Shiyao 李侍堯		1763	1764	
44	Wu Dashan 吳達善		1764	1766	
45	Liu Zao 劉藻		1766	1766	
46	Dingchang 定長		1766	1768	
	Gao Jin 高晉		1768	1768	Acting Viceroy
47	Wu Dashan 吳達善		1768	1771	
48	Fuming'an 富明安		1771	1772	
49	Haiming 海明		1772	1772	
50	Fulehun 富勒渾		1772	1773	
	Chen Huizu 陳輝祖		1772	1773	Acting Viceroy
51	Wenshou 文綬		1773	1776	
52	Fulehun 富勒渾		1776	1777	
53	Sanbao 三寶		1777	1779	
54	Tuside 圖思德		1779	1779	
55	Fulehun 富勒渾		1779	1780	
56	Shuchang 舒常		1780	1784	
57	Tecengge 特成額		1784	1786	
58	Bi Yuan 畢沅		1786	1786	
59	Li Shiyao 李侍堯		1786	1787	
60	Changqing 常青		1787	1787	
61	Shuchang 舒常		1787	1788	
63	Bi Yuan 畢沅		1788	1794	
64	Funing 福寧		1794	1795	
65	Bi Yuan 畢沅		1795	1797	
66	Lebao 勒保		1797	1798	
67	Jing'an 景安		1798	1799	
68	Wesibu 倭什布		1799	1800	
70	Jiang Sheng 姜晟		1800	1800	
71	Shulin 書麟		1800	1801	
72	Wesibu 倭什布		1801	1801	
73	Wu Xiongguang 吳熊光		1801	1805	
74	Bailing 百齡		1805	1805	
75	Quanbao 全保		1805	1806	
76	Wang Zhiyi 汪志伊		1806	1810	
77	Ma Huiyu 馬慧裕		1810	1816	
78	Sun Yuting 孫玉庭		1816	1816	
79	Ruan Yuan 阮元		1816	1817	
80	Qingbao 慶保		1817	1820	
81	Zhang Yinghan 張映漢		1820	1820	
82	Chen Ruolin 陳若霖		1820	1822	
83	Li Hongbin 李鴻賓		1822	1826	
84	Songfu 嵩孚		1826	1830	
	Yang Yizeng 楊懌曾		1830	1830	Acting Viceroy
85	Lu Kun 盧坤		1830	1832	
86	Nergingge 訥爾經額		1832	1837	
87	Lin Zexu 林則徐		February 1837	December 1838	
88	Zhou Tianjue 周天爵		December 1838	December 1840	
89	Guiliang 桂良		June 1839	December 1839	
90	Yutai 裕泰		December 1839	December 1851	
91	Cheng Yucai 程矞采		December 1851	October 1852	
	Xu Guangjin 徐廣縉		October 1852	February 1853	Acting Viceroy
	Zhang Liangji 張亮基		February 1853	September 1853	
92	Wu Wenrong 吳文鎔		September 1853	February 1854	
93	Taiyong 台湧		March 1854	July 1854	
94	Yang Pei 楊霈		October 1854	June 1855	
95	Guanwen 官文		June 1855	February 1867	
	Tan Tingxiang 譚廷襄		1866	1866	Acting Viceroy
96	Li Hongzhang 李鴻章		February 1867	August 1870	
	Li Hanzhang 李瀚章		1867	1868	Acting Viceroy
	Guo Boyin 郭柏蔭		1868	1869	Acting Viceroy
97	Li Hanzhang 李瀚章		August 1870	April 1882	
	Weng Tongjue 翁同爵		1875	1876	Acting Viceroy
98	Tu Zongying 塗宗瀛		April 1882	June 1883	
	Bian Baodi 卞寶第		June 1883	April 1885	Acting Viceroy
	Yulu 裕祿		April 1885	August 1889	Acting Viceroy
99	Zhang Zhidong 張之洞		August 1889	November 1894	
100	Tan Jixun 譚繼洵		November 1894	January 1896	
101	Zhang Zhidong 張之洞		January 1896	November 1902	
	Duanfang 端方		November 1902	1904	Acting Viceroy
Viceroy of Huguang and Provincial Governor of Hubei (1904–1911)
102	Zhang Zhidong 張之洞		1904	August 1907	
103	Zhao Erxun 趙爾巽		August 1907	March 1908	
104	Chen Kuilong 陳夔龍		March 1908	October 1909	
	Ruicheng 瑞澂		October 1909	October 1911	Acting Viceroy
	Yuan Shikai 袁世凱		14 October 1911		Never assumed office
	Wei Guangtao 魏光燾		1911		Never assumed office
	Wang Shizhen 王士珍		2 November 1911		Never assumed office
	Duan Zhigui 段芝貴		14 November 1911		Never assumed office
	Duan Qirui 段祺瑞		17 November 1911		Never assumed office
