= Viceroy of Shaan-Gan =

Regional viceroy in Qing Empire

Chinese name
- Traditional Chinese: 陝甘總督
- Simplified Chinese: 陜甘总督
Transcriptions
Standard Mandarin
- Hanyu Pinyin: Shǎn Gān Zǒngdū

Governor-General of Shaanxi, Gansu and Other Local Areas, in Charge of Military Affairs, Food and Wages, Tea and Horses and Governor Affairs
- Traditional Chinese: 總督陝甘等處地方提督軍務、兼理糧餉、管理茶馬、兼巡撫事
- Simplified Chinese: 总督陕甘等处地方提督军务、兼理粮饷、管理茶马、兼巡抚事
Transcriptions

Manchu name
- Manchu script: ᡧᠠᠨᠰᡳ ᡬᠠᠨᠰᡠ ᡳ ᡠᡥᡝᡵᡳ ᡴᠠᡩᠠᠯᠠᡵᠠ ᠠᠮᠪᠠᠨ
- Romanization: šansi gansu i uheri kadalara amban

Jurisdiction of the Viceroy of Shaan-Gan in 1911

The Viceroy of Shaan-Gan, fully in Chinese as the Governor-General of Shaanxi, Gansu and Other Local Areas, in Charge of Military Affairs, Food and Wages, Tea and Horses and Governor Affairs, was one of eight regional Viceroys during the Qing dynasty. The Viceroy of Shaan-Gan had jurisdiction of military, civil, and political affairs over then Shaanxi Province and then Gansu Province.

== Name ==
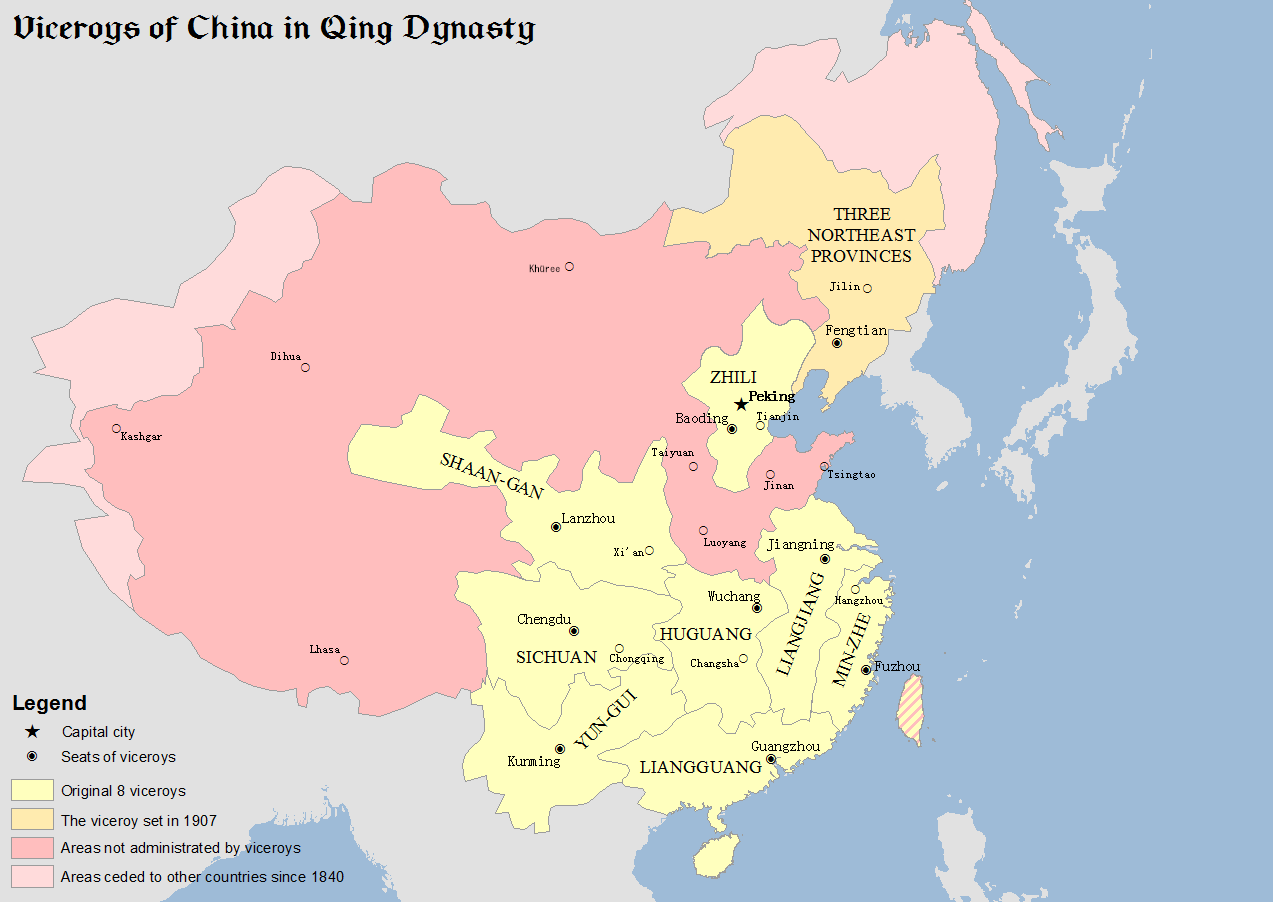
Map of viceroys in Qing Dynasty of China

The name Shaan-Gan is derived by taking the first characters of the province names Shaanxi and Gansu.

== History ==
=== Ming dynasty ===
The office of Viceroy of Shaan-Gan originated in the early Ming dynasty with the garrisoning of military forces in three towns along the northern border of Shaanxi Province. The three garrisons were called "Xunfu of Yansui" (延綏巡撫), "Xunfu of Ningxia" (寧夏巡撫) and "Xunfu of Gansu" (甘肅巡撫), respectively.

In 1497, when the Mongols of the Northern Yuan dynasty made intrusions across the border, the Hongzhi Emperor put Wang Yue (王越) in charge of coordinating military actions in Shaanxi, Yansui, Ningxia and Gansu.

In the early reign of the Zhengde Emperor (r. 1505–1521), the Mongols invaded Guyuan. The general Cao Xiong (曹雄) rejected external help from reinforcements. Yang Yiqing (楊一清) led lightly armed cavalry to launch a surprise attack on the Mongols and succeeded in driving them back. After this incident, Yang Yiqing realized that military operations in Yansui, Ningxia and Gansu had to be better coordinated, hence he urged the imperial court to appoint a viceroy to oversee the three areas. Liu Daxia (劉大夏) nominated Yang Yiqing for that position.

The office of the viceroy was created in 1525, during the reign of the Jiajing Emperor, under the name "tidu of military affairs" (提督軍務). The office was renamed to "zongzhi" (總制) in 1528, and to "zongdu" (總督) in 1540. The headquarters were located at Huamachi (花馬池; present-day Yanchi County, Ningxia).

=== Qing dynasty ===
The office was recreated in 1645, during the reign of the Shunzhi Emperor, as "Viceroy of the Three Borders in Shaanxi" (陝西三邊總督), with the headquarters at Guyuan. In 1653, the Viceroy's jurisdiction expanded to include Sichuan Province, hence the office was renamed "Viceroy of (Si)Chuan and the Three Borders in Shaanxi" (川陝三邊總督). In 1656, the office was renamed "Viceroy of (Si)Chuan-Shaan(xi)" (川陝總督) and its headquarters were relocated to Hanzhong. In 1661, the office changed its name to "Viceroy of Shaanxi" (陝西總督) after Sichuan was removed from its jurisdiction.

In 1666, during the reign of the Kangxi Emperor, the Viceroy's jurisdiction expanded to include Shanxi Province, hence it was renamed "Viceroy of Shan(xi)-Shaan(xi)" (山陝總督), with its headquarters in Xi'an. Shanxi was removed in 1672, and Sichuan was added again in 1680.

In 1723, the Yongzheng Emperor ordered that all Viceroys who also held the position of Secretary of War (兵部尚書) would concurrently be appointed as Right Censor-in-Chief (右都御史) of the Detection Branch (都察院) in the Censorate. Those Viceroys who did not hold the position of Secretary of War would be concurrently appointed as Right Vice Secretary of War (兵部右侍郎) and Right Vice Censor-in-Chief (右副都御史). In 1725, Yue Zhongqi (岳鍾琪) became the first Han Chinese outside of the Han Military Eight Banners to become a Viceroy when he was appointed as Viceroy of Chuan-Shaan. In 1731, the office was renamed "Viceroy of Shaanxi" (陝西總督) and its jurisdiction covered Shaanxi and Gansu; a separate Viceroy of Sichuan was created for Sichuan.

In 1736, the Qianlong Emperor abolished the Viceroy of Sichuan and recreated the office of Viceroy of Chuan-Shaan. In 1748, he split the Viceroy of Chuan-Shaan into Viceroy of Sichuan and Viceroy of Shaan-Gan, but reversed the changes again in 1759 and established a separate Viceroy of Gansu, with its headquarters in Suzhou (肅州; present-day Suzhou District, Jiuquan, Gansu). In 1760, the Qianlong Emperor abolished the Viceroy of Gansu and restored the two offices of Viceroy of Sichuan and Viceroy of Shaan-Gan. The Viceroy of Shaan-Gan was headquartered in Lanzhou and concurrently held the appointment of a Provincial Governor.

In 1882, during the reign of the Guangxu Emperor, the newly established Xinjiang Province was included under the jurisdiction of the Viceroy of Shaan-Gan.

== List of Viceroys of Shaan-Gan ==
=== Ming dynasty ===
#	Name	Portrait	Start of term	End of term	Notes
1	Wang Yue 王越		1474	1498	As "Zongzhi of Military Affairs at the Three Borders" (總制三邊軍務) in 1474, then "Zongzhi and Xunfu of Affairs in Gan, Liang and the Borders" (總制甘、涼邊務兼巡撫) from 1497 to 1498
2	Qin Hong 秦紘		1501	1504	As "Zongzhi of Military Affairs at the Three Borders" (總制三邊軍務)
3	Li Yue 李鉞		1522	1523	As "Zongzhi of Military Affairs in Shaanxi and the Three Borders" (總制陝西三邊軍務)
4	Yang Yiqing 楊一清		1525	1525	As "Zongzhi of Military Affairs in Shaanxi and the Three Borders" (總制陝西三邊軍務)
5	Wang Xian 王憲		1525	1528	As "Supervisor of Military Affairs in Shaanxi and the Three Borders" (督陝西三邊軍務)
6	Wang Qiong 王瓊		1528	1532	As "Supervisor of Military Affairs in Shaanxi and the Three Borders" (督陝西三邊軍務)
7	Li Wen 李汶		1535		As "Supervisor of Military Affairs in Shaanxi and the Three Borders" (督陝西三邊軍務)
8	Zeng Xian 曾銑		1546	1548	As "Viceroy of Military Affairs in Shaanxi and the Three Borders" (總督陝西三邊軍務)
9	Gu Qizhi 顧其志		1610		As "Viceroy of Military Affairs in Shaanxi and the Three Borders" (總督陝西三邊軍務)
10	Huang Jiashan 黃嘉善				As "Viceroy of Military Affairs in Shaanxi and the Three Borders" (總督陝西三邊軍務)
11	Liu Minkuan 劉敏寬				As "Viceroy of Military Affairs in Shaanxi and the Three Borders" (總督陝西三邊軍務)
12	Zhang Heming 張鶴鳴				As "Viceroy of Military Affairs in Shaanxi and the Three Borders" (總督陝西三邊軍務)
13	Yang Yingping 楊應聘				As "Viceroy of Military Affairs in Shaanxi and the Three Borders" (總督陝西三邊軍務)
14	Qi Guangzong 祁光宗		1615		As "Viceroy of Military Affairs in Gan, Liang and the Three Borders" (總督甘、涼三邊軍務)
15	Li Qiyuan 李起元				As "Viceroy of Military Affairs in Shaanxi and the Three Borders" (總督陝西三邊軍務)
16	Wu Zhiwang 武之望		1628		As "Viceroy of Military Affairs in Shaanxi and the Three Borders" (總督陝西三邊軍務)
17	Yang He 楊鶴		1629		As "Viceroy of Military Affairs in Shaanxi and the Three Borders" (總督陝西三邊軍務)
18	Hong Chengchou 洪承疇		1631		As "Viceroy of Military Affairs in Shaanxi and the Three Borders" (總督陝西三邊軍務)
19	Zheng Chongjian 鄭崇儉		1639		As "Viceroy of Military Affairs in Shaanxi and the Three Borders" (總督陝西三邊軍務)
20	Ding Qirui 丁啟睿		1640		As "Viceroy of Military Affairs in Shaanxi and the Three Borders" (總督陝西三邊軍務)

=== Qing dynasty ===
#	Name	Portrait	Start of term	End of term	Notes
Viceroy of Shaanxi and the Three Borders (1645–1653)
1	Wang Wenkui 王文奎		1645		
2	Meng Qiaofang 孟喬芳		1645	1653	
Viceroy of Chuan-Shaan and the Three Borders (1653–1656)
3	Meng Qiaofang 孟喬芳		1653	1654	
4	Jin Li 金礪		1654	1656	
Viceroy of Chuan-Shaan (1656–1661)
5	Jin Li 金礪		1656	1656	
6	Ma Zhixian 馬之先		1656	1657	
7	Li Guoying 李國英		1657	1661	
Viceroy of Shaanxi (1661–1666)
8	Bai Rumei 白如梅		1661	1666	
Viceroy of Shan-Shaan (1666–1672)
9	Bai Rumei 白如梅		1666	1666	
10	Lu Chongjun 盧崇峻		1666	1667	
11	Moluo 莫洛		1668	1670	
12	Luoduo 羅多		1671	1672	
13	Ošan 鄂善		1672	1672	
Viceroy of Shan-Shaan (excluding Shanxi) (1672–1680)
14	Ošan 鄂善		1672	1673	
15	Hajan 哈占		1673	1680	
Viceroy of Shan-Shaan (including Sichuan) (1680–1731)
16	Hajan 哈占		1680	1683	
17	Hife 禧佛		1683	1686	
18	Tuna 圖納		1686	1688	
19	Gesitai 葛思泰		1688	1692	
20	Foron 佛倫		1692	1694	
21	Wuhe 吳赫		1694	1699	
	Silda 席爾達		1699	1701	Acting Viceroy
22	Gioro-Huaxian 覺羅華顯		1701	1704	
23	Boji 博霽		1704	1708	
24	Cišiu 齊世武		1708	1709	
25	Yin Tai 殷泰		1709	1713	
26	Ehai 鄂海		1713	1718	
27	Nian Gengyao 年羹堯		1719	1725	
28	Yue Zhongqi 岳鍾琪		1725	1729	
	Tulišen 圖理琛		1725	1725	Acting Viceroy
29	Yue Zhongqi 岳鍾琪		1729	1732	
	Jalangga 查郎阿		1729	1731	Acting Viceroy
Viceroy of Shaanxi (1731–1736)
30	Jalangga 查郎阿		1731	1732	
	Liu Yuyi 劉於義		1732	1735	Acting Viceroy
Viceroy of Chuan-Shaan (1736–1748)
31	Jalangga 查郎阿		1736	1738	
	Liu Yuyi 劉於義		1736	1737	Acting Viceroy
32	Omida 鄂彌達		1738	1740	
33	Yengišan 尹繼善		1740	1742	
	Martai 馬爾泰		1742	1743	Acting Viceroy
34	Qingfu 慶復		1743	1747	
35	Zhang Guangsi 張廣泗		1747	1748	
	Huang Tinggui 黃廷桂		1747		Acting Viceroy
	Furdan 傅爾丹		1748		Acting Viceroy
	Fuheng 傅恆		1748		Acting Viceroy
36	Ts'ereng 策楞		1748		
	Yengišan 尹繼善		1748		Acting Viceroy
Viceroy of Shaan-Gan (excluding Sichuan) (1748–1759)
37	Yengišan 尹繼善		1748	1749	
38	Hubao 瑚寶		1749	1749	
39	Yengišan 尹繼善		1750	1751	
40	Huang Tinggui 黃廷桂		1751	1753	
	Yengišan 尹繼善		1753	1753	Acting Viceroy
41	Yongchang 永常		1753	1754	
	Liu Tongxun 劉統勛		1754	1755	Acting Viceroy
42	Huang Tinggui 黃廷桂		1755	1759	
43	Wu Dashan 吳達善		1759	1759	
Viceroy of Shaan-Gan (1760–1911)
44	Yang Yingju 楊應琚		1760	1766	Started his term as Viceroy of Gansu in 1759, then as Viceroy of Shaan-Gan from 1760 onwards
45	Wu Dashan 吳達善		1766	1768	
46	Mingshan 明山		1769	1771	
47	Wu Dashan 吳達善		1771	1771	
48	Wenshou 文綬		1771	1772	
49	Haiming 海明		1772	1772	
	Lergiyen 勒爾謹		1772	1772	Acting Viceroy
50	Lergiyen 勒爾謹		1772	1776	
	Bi Yuan 畢沅		1776	1776	Acting Viceroy
51	Lergiyen 勒爾謹		1776	1781	
52	Li Shiyao 李侍堯		1781	1784	
	Bi Yuan 畢沅		1783	1783	Acting Viceroy
53	Fuk'anggan 福康安		1784	1787	
	Qinggui 慶桂		1785	1785	Acting Viceroy
	Yongbao 永保		1786	1786	Acting Viceroy
	Lebao 勒保		1787	1787	Acting Viceroy
54	Lebao 勒保		1788	1795	
55	Yimian 宜綿		1795	1796	
	Lu Youren 陸有仁		1796	1797	Acting Viceroy
	Yingshan 英善		1797	1797	Acting Viceroy
56	Yimian 宜綿		1797	1799	
	Hengrui 恆瑞		1799	1799	Acting Viceroy
57	Songyun 松筠		1799	1800	
58	Changlin 長麟		1800	1801	
59	Huiling 惠齡		1801	1804	
	Nayancheng 那彥成		1804	1804	Acting Viceroy
60	Wesibu 倭什布		1804	1806	
61	Quanbao 全保		1806	1807	
	Fang Weidian 方維甸		1806	1806	Acting Viceroy
62	Changling 長齡		1807	1809	
	Cai Tingheng 蔡廷衡		1807	1807	Acting Viceroy
	Hening 和寧		1809	1809	
63	Songyun 松筠		1809	1809	
64	Nayancheng 那彥成		1810	1813	
65	Changling 長齡		1813	1814	
66	Xianfu 先福		1814	1817	
	Gao Qi 高杞		1814	1814	Acting Viceroy
	Hening 和寧		1817	1817	Acting Viceroy
67	Changling 長齡		1817	1822	
	Zhu Xun 朱勳		1821	1821	Acting Viceroy
68	Nayancheng 那彥成		1822	1825	
69	Changling 長齡		1825	1825	
	Ošan 鄂山		1825	1825	Acting Viceroy
	Yang Yuchun 楊遇春		1825	1826	Acting Viceroy
	Ošan 鄂山		1826	1826	Acting Viceroy
70	Yang Yuchun 楊遇春		1827	1835	
	Ošan 鄂山		1830	1830	Acting Viceroy
71	Hūsungge 瑚松額		1835	1840	
72	Nergingge 訥爾經額		1840	1840	
	Hūsungge 瑚松額		1840	1840	Acting Viceroy
	Enteheng'e 恩特亨額		1840	1841	Acting Viceroy
73	Enteheng'e 恩特亨額		1841	1842	
74	Funiyang'a 富呢揚阿		1842	1845	
75	Huiji 惠吉		1845	1845	
	Deng Tingzhen 鄧廷楨		1845	1845	Acting Viceroy
76	Buyantai 布彥泰		1845	1849	
	Lin Zexu 林則徐		1845	1845	Acting Viceroy
	Yang Yizeng 楊以增		1847	1847	Acting Viceroy
	Qishan 琦善		1849	1849	Acting Viceroy
77	Qishan 琦善		1849	1851	
	Saying'a 薩迎阿		1851	1851	Acting Viceroy
78	Yutai 裕泰		1851	1851	
	Šuhingga 舒興阿		1851	1851	Acting Viceroy
79	Šuhingga 舒興阿		1851	1853	
	Yi Tang 易棠		1853	1853	Acting Viceroy
80	Yi Tang 易棠		1854	1856	
81	Yue Bin 樂斌		1856	1860	
	Changji 常績		1856	1856	Acting Viceroy
	Lin Yangzu 林揚祖		1859	1860	Acting Viceroy
	Fuji 福濟		1860	1860	Acting Viceroy
82	Yue Bin 樂斌		1860	1861	
83	Linkui 麟魁		1862	1862	
	Shen Zhaolin 沈兆霖		1862	1862	Acting Viceroy
	Enlin 恩麟		1862	1862	Acting Viceroy
84	Xilin 熙麟		1862	1864	
85	Yang Yuebin 楊岳斌		1864	1866	
	Duxing'a 都興阿		1864	1864	Acting Viceroy
	Enlin 恩麟		1864	1864	Acting Viceroy
85	Zuo Zongtang 左宗棠		1866	1866	
	Mutushan 穆圖善		1866	1866	Acting Viceroy
86	Mutushan 穆圖善		1867	1869	
87	Zuo Zongtang 左宗棠		1869	1880	
88	Yang Changjun 楊昌濬		1880	1881	
89	Zeng Guoquan 曾國荃		1881	1881	
90	Tan Zhonglin 譚鍾麟		1881	1888	
91	Yang Changjun 楊昌濬		1888	1895	
	Tao Mo 陶模		1895	1895	Acting Viceroy
92	Tao Mo 陶模		1896	1899	
	Wei Guangtao 魏光燾		1899	1899	Acting Viceroy
93	Wei Guangtao 魏光燾		1900	1900	
94	Songfan 崧蕃		1900	1905	
	He Fukun 何福堃		1900	1901	Acting Viceroy
	Li Tingxiao 李廷簫		1900	1900	Acting Viceroy
95	Shengyun 升允		1905	1909	
96	Changgeng 長庚		1909	1911	
