= Viceroy of Sichuan =

Regional viceroy in Qing Empire

Chinese name
- Traditional Chinese: 四川總督
- Simplified Chinese: 四川总督
Transcriptions
Standard Mandarin
- Hanyu Pinyin: Sìchuān Zǒngdū

Governor-General of Sichuan and Other Local Areas, in Charge of Military Affairs, Food and Wages and Governor Affairs (full title)
- Traditional Chinese: 總督四川等處地方提督軍務、糧饟兼巡撫事
- Simplified Chinese: 总督四川等处地方提督军务、粮饟兼巡抚事
Transcriptions

Manchu name
- Manchu script: ᠰᡟᠴᡠᠸᠠᠨ ᡳ ᡠᡥᡝᡵᡳ ᡴᠠᡩᠠᠯᠠᡵᠠ ᠠᠮᠪᠠᠨ
- Romanization: sycuwan i uheri kadalara amban

Jurisdiction of the Viceroy of Sichuan in 1911

The Viceroy of Sichuan, fully in Chinese as the Governor-General of Sichuan and Other Local Areas, in Charge of Military Affairs, Food and Wages and Governor Affairs, was one of eight regional Viceroys during the Qing dynasty. The Viceroy of Sichuan had jurisdiction of military, civil, and political affairs over then Sichuan Province (approx. nowadays most of Sichuan, most of Chongqing, northern part of Yunnan, and minor part of Xizang, Guizhou, Qinghai, Gansu, and Shaanxi).

== History ==
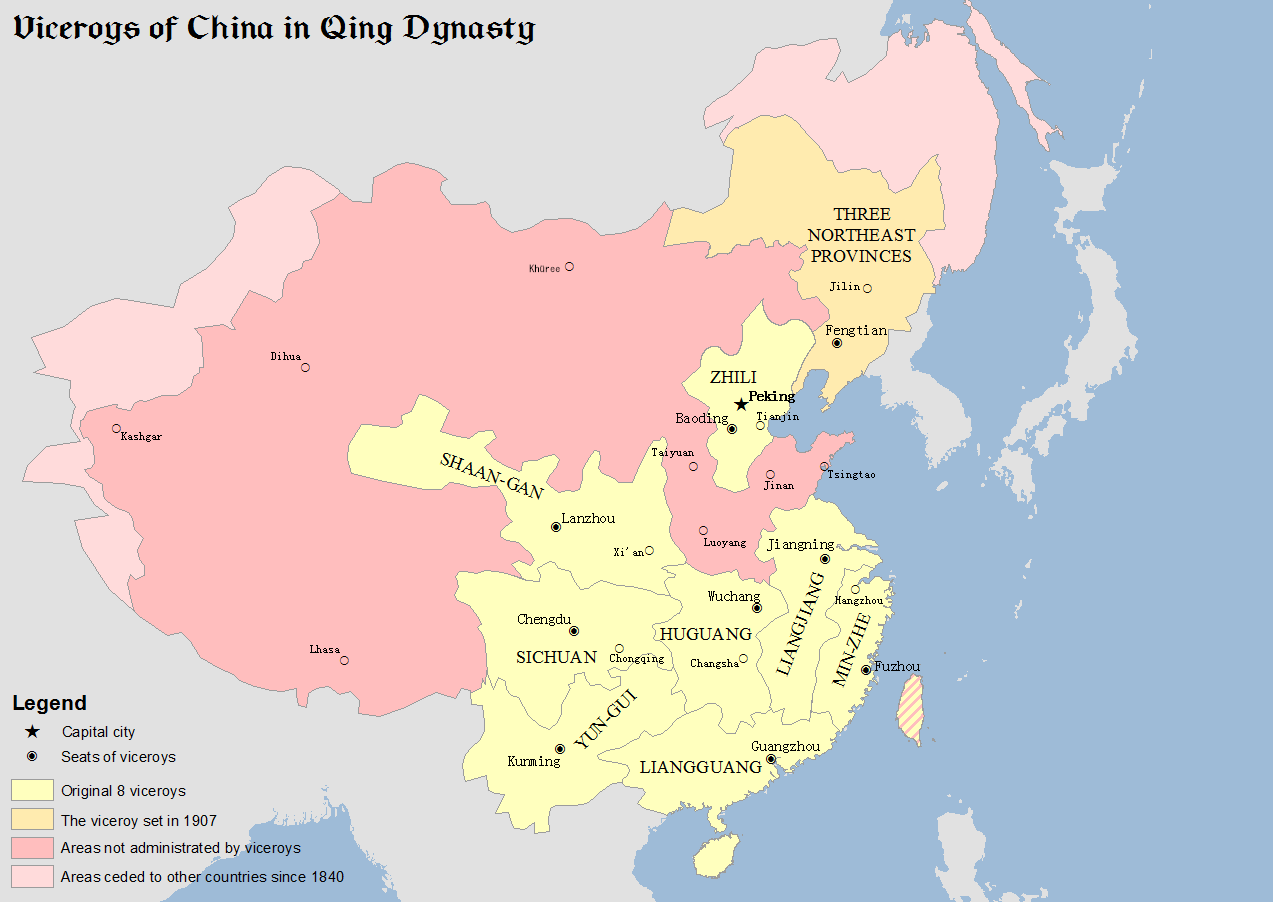
Map of viceroys in Qing Dynasty of China

The origins of the Viceroy of Sichuan trace back to 1644, during the reign of the Shunzhi Emperor, with the creation of the office of the Provincial Governor of Sichuan (四川巡撫). Its headquarters were in Chengdu. In 1645, the Qing government created the Viceroy of Huguang-Sichuan with Luo Xiujin (羅繡錦) as the first Viceroy overseeing both Huguang (present-day Hubei and Hunan) and Sichuan provinces.

In 1653, Sichuan was placed under the jurisdiction of the Viceroy of the Three Borders in Shaanxi, which was subsequently renamed "Viceroy of Chuan and the Three Borders in Shaanxi" (川陝三邊總督) with Meng Qiaofang (孟喬芳) as the officeholder. In 1656, the office was divided into two separate Viceroys for Shaanxi and Sichuan. The Viceroy of Sichuan was based in Chongqing. In 1661, the Viceroy of Sichuan relocated its headquarters to Hanzhong.

In 1668, during the reign of the Kangxi Emperor, the Viceroy of Huguang was abolished and merged into the Viceroy of Sichuan, which was then renamed "Viceroy of Chuan-Hu" (川湖總督) and based in Jingzhou. In 1670, the Viceroy of Chuan-Hu relocated to Chongqing. Four years later, perhaps coinciding with the Revolt of the Three Feudatories, the Viceroy of Chuan-Hu reverted to pre-1668, separating into the Viceroy of Huguang and Viceroy of Sichuan. In 1680, the Kangxi Emperor merged the Viceroy of Sichuan with the Viceroy of Shaanxi under the "Viceroy of Chuan-Shaan" (川陝總督), with its headquarters in Xi'an. In 1718, a separate Viceroy was created for Sichuan, so the Viceroy of Chuan-Shaan stopped managing Sichuan. However, these changes were reversed in 1721.

In 1731, the Yongzheng Emperor split the Viceroy of Chuan-Shaan into the Viceroy of Sichuan and Viceroy of Shaan-Gan, with the latter headquartered in Chengdu.

In 1736, the Qianlong Emperor abolished the Viceroy of Sichuan and recreated the office of Viceroy of Chuan-Shaan. In 1748, during the campaign against the Jinchuan hill peoples in Sichuan, the Qianlong Emperor split the Viceroy of Chuan-Shaan into the Viceroy of Sichuan and Viceroy of Shaan-Gan. He merged the two Viceroys in 1759 but reversed the changes in the following year. The system had remained as such until the end of the Qing dynasty.

== List of Viceroys of Sichuan ==
#	Name	Portrait	Start of term	End of term	Notes
Viceroy of Huguang-Sichuan (1645–1652)
1	Luo Xiujin 羅繡錦		1645	1652	
Viceroy of Chuan-Shaan and the Three Borders (1653–1656)
2	Meng Qiaofang 孟喬芳		1653	1654	
3	Jin Li 金礪		1654	1656	
Viceroy of Chuan-Shaan (1656–1661)
4	Jin Li 金礪		1656	1656	
5	Ma Zhixian 馬之先		1656	1657	
6	Li Guoying 李國英		1657	1661	
Viceroy of Sichuan (1661–1667)
7	Li Guoying 李國英		1661	1666	
8	Miao Cheng 苗澄		1666	1667	
Viceroy of Chuan-Hu (1668–1674)
9	Liu Zhaoqi 劉兆麒		1668	1669	
10	Cai Yurong 蔡毓榮		1670	1682	Stopped administering Sichuan in 1674
Viceroy of Sichuan (1674–1680)
11	Zhou Youde 周有德		1674	1674	
12	Yang Maoxun 楊茂勛		1679	1680	
Viceroy of Shan-Shaan (1680–1718)
13	Hajan 哈占		1680	1683	
14	Hife 禧佛		1683	1686	
15	Tuna 圖納		1686	1688	
16	Gesitai 葛思泰		1688	1692	
17	Foron 佛倫		1692	1694	
18	Wuhe 吳赫		1694	1699	
	Silda 席爾達		1699	1701	Acting Viceroy
19	Gioro-Huaxian 覺羅華顯		1701	1704	
20	Boji 博霽		1704	1708	
21	Cišiu 齊世武		1708	1709	
22	Yin Tai 殷泰		1709	1713	
23	Ehai 鄂海		1713	1718	
Viceroy of Sichuan (1718–1721)
24	Nian Gengyao 年羹堯		1718	1721	
Viceroy of Chuan-Shaan (1721–1731)
25	Nian Gengyao 年羹堯		1721	1725	
26	Yue Zhongqi 岳鍾琪		1725	1729	
27	Jalangga 查郎阿		1729	1731	
Viceroy of Sichuan (1731–1735)
28	Huang Tinggui 黃廷桂		1731	1735	
Viceroy of Chuan-Shaan (1736–1748)
29	Jalangga 查郎阿		1736	1738	
	Liu Yuyi 劉於義		1736	1737	Acting Viceroy
30	Omida 鄂彌達		1738	1740	
31	Yengišan 尹繼善		1740	1742	
32	Martai 馬爾泰		1742	1743	Acting Viceroy
33	Qingfu 慶復		1743	1747	
34	Zhang Guangsi 張廣泗		1747	1748	
	Huang Tinggui 黃廷桂		1747		Acting Viceroy
	Furdan 傅爾丹		1748		Acting Viceroy
35	Fuheng 傅恆		1748		Acting Viceroy
36	Ts'ereng 策楞		1748		
	Yengišan 尹繼善		1748		Acting Viceroy
Viceroy of Sichuan (1748–1759)
37	Ts'ereng 策楞		1748	1753	
38	Huang Tinggui 黃廷桂		1753	1755	
39	Kaitai 開泰		1755	1759	
Viceroy of Chuan-Shaan (1759–1760)
40	Kaitai 開泰		1759	1760	
Viceroy of Sichuan (1760–1911)
41	Kaitai 開泰		1760	1763	
42	Obi 鄂弼		1763	1763	
43	Artai 阿爾泰		1763	1770	
	Agui 阿桂		1764	1764	Acting Viceroy
44	Defu 德福		1770	1771	
45	Artai 阿爾泰		1771	1771	
46	Wenshou 文綬		1771	1771	
47	Guilin 桂林		1771	1772	
48	Artai 阿爾泰		1772	1772	
49	Wenshou 文綬		1772	1772	
50	Liu Bingtian 劉秉恬		1772	1773	
	Fulehun 富勒渾		1772	1772	Acting Viceroy
51	Fulehun 富勒渾		1773	1776	
52	Wenshou 文綬		1776	1781	
53	Fuk'anggan 福康安		1781	1783	
54	Li Shijie 李世傑		1783	1787	
55	Baoning 保寧		1786	1787	
56	Li Shijie 李世傑		1787	1789	
57	Sun Shiyi 孫士毅		1789	1790	
58	Ohūi 鄂輝		1790	1791	
59	Xianling 憲齡		1791	1793	
60	Fuk'anggan 福康安		1793	1794	
61	Heliyen 和琳		1794	1796	
	Sun Shiyi 孫士毅		1796	1796	Acting Viceroy
62	Funing 福寧		1796	1797	
63	Lebao 勒保		1798	1799	
64	Kuilun 魁倫		1799	1800	
65	Lebao 勒保		1800	1810	
66	Changming 常明		1810	1817	
	Li Luanyi 李鑾宜		1817	1817	Acting Viceroy
	Dening'a 德寧阿		1817	1817	Acting Viceroy
67	Jiang Youxian 蔣攸銛		1817	1822	
68	Chen Ruolin 陳若霖		1822	1823	
69	Dai Sanxi 戴三錫		1823	1829	
70	Qishan 琦善	Qishan.jpg	1829	1831	
71	Ošan 鄂山		1831	1838	
72	Gioro-Baoxing 覺羅寶興		1839	1846	
73	Qishan 琦善	Qishan.jpg	1846	1849	
74	Xu Zechun 徐澤醇		1849	1852	
75	Huicheng 慧成		1852	1853	
76	Yurui 裕瑞		1853	1854	
77	Huang Zonghan 黃宗漢		1854	1856	
78	Wu Zhenyu 吳振棫		1856	1857	
79	Wang Qingyun 王慶雲		1857	1859	
80	Huang Zonghan 黃宗漢		1859	1859	
81	Zeng Wangyan 曾望顏		1859	1860	
82	Chongshi 崇實		1860	1861	
83	Luo Bingzhang 駱秉章		1861	1867	
84	Wu Tang 吳棠		1867	1875	
	Wenge 文格		1875	1875	Acting Viceroy
85	Li Hanzhang 李瀚章		1875	1876	
86	Ding Baozhen 丁寶楨		1876	1886	
87	Liu Bingzhang 劉秉璋		1886	1894	
88	Tan Zhonglin 譚鍾麟		1894	1895	
89	Lu Chuanlin 鹿傳霖		1895	1897	
	Gongshou 恭壽		1897	1898	Acting Viceroy
90	Li Bingheng 李秉衡		1897	1897	Never assumed office
91	Yulu 裕祿		1897	1898	
92	Kuijun 奎俊		1898	1902	
	Cen Chunxuan 岑春煊		1902	1903	Acting Viceroy
93	Xiliang 錫良		1903	1907	
	Zhao Erfeng 趙爾豐		1907	1907	Acting Viceroy
94	Zhao Erxun 趙爾巽		1907	1907	Never assumed office
95	Chen Kuilong 陳夔龍		1907	1908	
96	Zhao Erxun 趙爾巽		1908	1911	
	Zhao Erfeng 趙爾豐		1911	1911	Acting Viceroy
	Cen Chunxuan 岑春煊		1911	1911	Acting Viceroy; never assumed office
97	Duanfang 端方		1911	1911	Assassinated in office
