= Viceroy of Yun-Gui =

Regional viceroy in Qing Empire

Chinese name
- Traditional Chinese: 雲貴總督
- Simplified Chinese: 云贵总督
Transcriptions
Standard Mandarin
- Hanyu Pinyin: Yún Guì Zǒngdū

Governor-General of Yun-Gui Provinces and Other Local Areas, in Charge of Military Affairs, Food and Wages and Governor Affairs (full title)
- Traditional Chinese: 總督雲貴等處地方提督軍務、糧饟兼巡撫事
- Simplified Chinese: 总督云贵等处地方提督军务、粮饷兼巡抚事
Transcriptions

Manchu name
- Manchu script: ᠶᡡᠨᠨᠠᠨ ᡤᡠᡳᠵᡝᠣ ᡳ ᡠᡥᡝᡵᡳ ᡴᠠᡩᠠᠯᠠᡵᠠ ᠠᠮᠪᠠᠨ
- Romanization: yūnnan guijeo i uheri kadalara amban

Jurisdiction of the Viceroy of Yun-Gui in 1911

The Viceroy of Yun-Gui, fully in Chinese as the Governor-General of Yun-Gui Provinces and Other Local Areas, in Charge of Military Affairs, Food and Wages and Governor Affairs, was one of eight regional Viceroys during the Qing dynasty of China. The Viceroy of Yun-Gui had jurisdiction of military, civil, and political affairs over then Yunnan Province and then Guizhou Province (approx. nowadays southern part of Yunnan and part of Guizhou).

== History ==
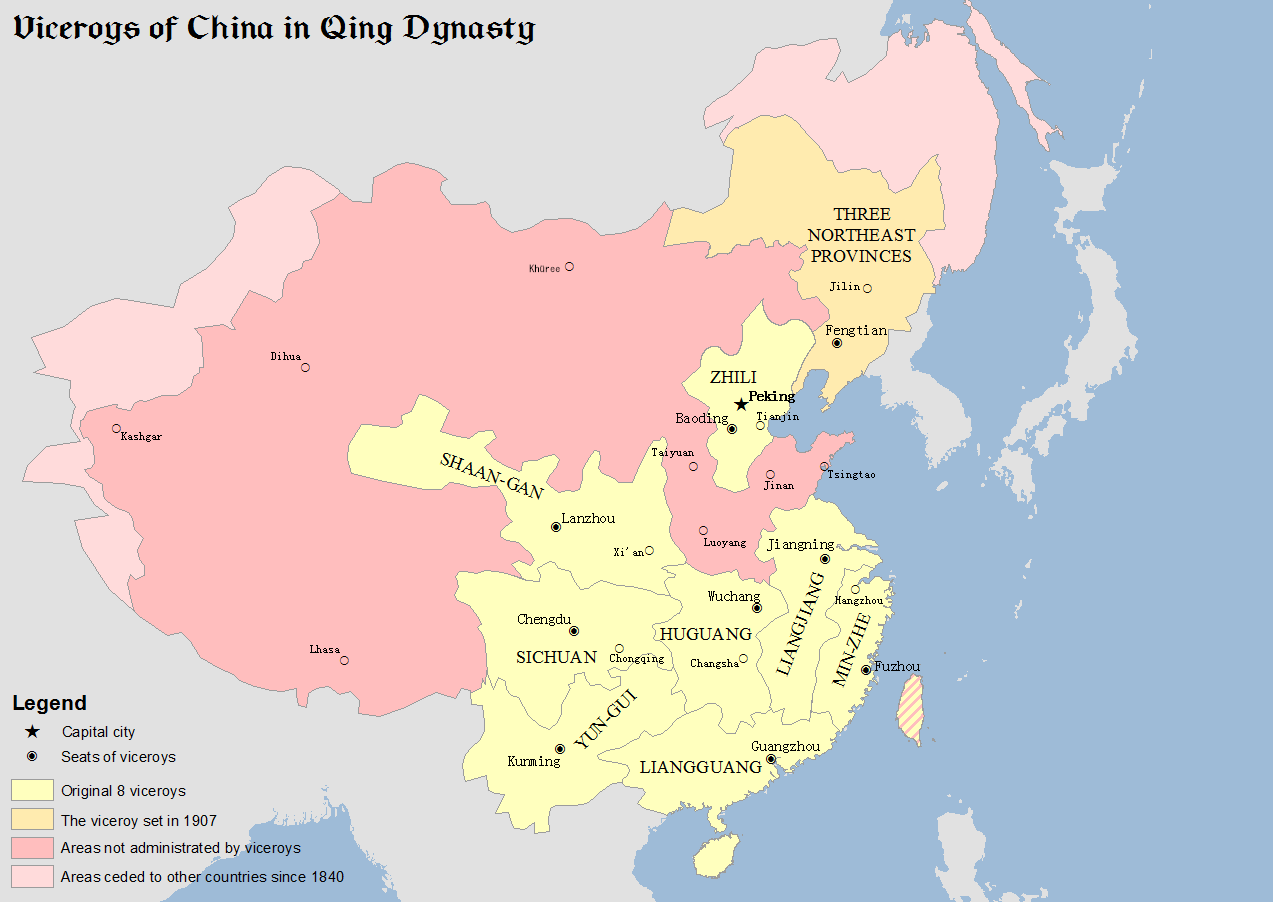
Map of viceroys in Qing Dynasty of China

The Viceroy of Yun-Gui was created in 1659, during the reign of the Shunzhi Emperor, as a jinglue (經略; military governor) office before it was converted to a Viceroy.

In 1662, during the reign of the Kangxi Emperor, the Viceroy of Yun-Gui split into the Viceroy of Yunnan and Viceroy of Guizhou, which were respectively headquartered in Qujing and Anshun. Two years later, the two viceroys were merged and the headquarters shifted to Guiyang. In 1673, the Kangxi Emperor restored the Viceroy of Yunnan, with its headquarters in Qujing. Between 1673 and 1681, the Revolt of the Three Feudatories broke out in Yunnan, Guangdong and Fujian provinces. The Viceroy of Yun-Gui was restored in 1680.

In 1728, the Yongzheng Emperor put the Viceroy of Yun-Gui in charge of Guangxi Province as well but reversed the changes in 1734. This system lasted until the fall of the Qing dynasty in 1912.

Starting from 1905, during the reign of the Guangxu Emperor, the Viceroy of Yun-Gui concurrently held the appointment of Provincial Governor of Yunnan.

== List of Viceroys of Yun-Gui ==
#	Name	Portrait	Start of term	End of term	Notes
1	Hong Chengchou 洪承疇		1653	1658	As Viceroy of Huguang, Liangguang and Yun-Gui
Viceroy of Yun-Gui (1659–1662)
2	Zhao Tingchen 趙廷臣		1659	1662	
Viceroy of Yunnan (1662–1664)
3	Bian Sanyuan 卞三元		1662	1664	
Viceroy of Guizhou (1662–1664)
3	Tong Yannian 佟延年		1662	1662	
4	Yang Maoxun 楊茂勛		1662	1664	
Viceroy of Yun-Gui (1665–1673)
5	Bian Sanyuan 卞三元		1665	1668	
6	Gan Wenkun 甘文焜		1668	1673	
Viceroy of Guizhou (1673–1680)
7	Ošan 鄂善		1673	1677	
8	Zhou Youde 周有德		1679	1680	
Viceroy of Yun-Gui (1680–1727)
9	Zhao Liangdong 趙良棟		1680	1682	
10	Cai Yurong 蔡毓榮		1682	1686	
11	Fan Chengxun 范承勛		1686	1694	
12	Ding Sikong 丁思孔		1694	1694	
13	Wang Jiwen 王繼文		1694	1698	
14	Baxi 巴錫		1698	1705	
15	Boihono 貝和諾		1705	1710	
16	Guo Li 郭瑮		1710	1716	
17	Jiang Chenxi 蔣陳錫		1716	1722	
18	Zhang Wenhuan 張文煥		1720	1722	
19	Gao Qizhuo 高其倬		1722	1725	
20	Iduri 伊都立		1725	1725	
21	Yang Mingshi 楊名時		1725	1726	
22	Ortai 鄂爾泰		1726	1727	
Viceroy of Yun-Gui (including Guangxi) (1728–1734)
23	Ortai 鄂爾泰		1728	1731	
24	Gao Qizhuo 高其倬		1731	1733	
25	Yengišan 尹繼善		1733	1734	
Viceroy of Yun-Gui (1734–1911)
26	Yengišan 尹繼善		1734	1737	
	Zhang Guangsi 張廣泗		1736	1747	As Viceroy of Guizhou
27	Qingfu 慶復		1737	1741	
28	Zhang Yunsui 張允隨		1741	1750	
29	Šose 碩色		1750	1755	
30	Aibilong 愛必達		1755	1756	
31	Hengwen 恆文		1756	1757	
32	Aibilong 愛必達		1757	1761	
33	Wu Dashan 吳達善		1761	1764	
34	Liu Zao 劉藻		1764	1766	
35	Yang Yingju 楊應琚		1766	1767	
36	Mingrui 明瑞		1767	1768	
37	Oning 鄂寧		1768	1768	
38	Agui 阿桂		1768	1769	
39	Mingde 明德		1769	1769	
40	Asha 阿思哈		1769	1769	
41	Zhangbao 彰寶		1769	1771	
42	Defu 德福		1771	1771	
43	Zhangbao 彰寶		1771	1774	
44	Tuside 圖思德		1774	1777	
45	Li Shiyao 李侍堯		1777	1780	
46	Shuchang 舒常		1780	1780	
47	Fuk'anggan 福康安		1780	1781	
48	Fugang 富綱		1781	1786	
49	Tecengge 特成額		1786	1786	
50	Fugang 富綱		1786	1794	
51	Fuk'anggan 福康安		1794	1795	
52	Lebao 勒保		1795	1797	
53	Ohūi 鄂輝		1797	1798	
54	Fugang 富綱		1798	1799	
55	Gioro-Changlin 覺羅長麟		1799	1799	
56	Shulin 書麟		1799	1800	
57	Gioro-Langgan 覺羅琅玕		1800	1804	
58	Bolin 伯麟		1804	1820	
59	Qingbao 慶保		1820	1820	
60	Shi Zhiguang 史致光		1820	1822	
61	Mingshan 明山		1822	1824	
62	Changling 長齡		1824	1825	
63	Zhao Shenzhen 趙慎畛		1825	1826	
64	Ruan Yuan 阮元		1826	1835	
65	Ilibu 伊里布		1835	1839	
66	Deng Tingzhen 鄧廷楨		1839	1839	
67	Guiliang 桂良		1839	1845	
68	He Changling 賀長齡		1845	1847	
69	Li Xingyuan 李星沅		1847	1848	
70	Lin Zexu 林則徐		1848	1849	
71	Cheng Yucai 程矞采		1849	1850	
72	Wu Wenrong 吳文鎔		1850	1852	
73	Wu Raodian 羅繞典		1852	1854	
74	Hengchun 恆春		1854	1857	
75	Wu Zhenyu 吳振棫		1857	1858	
76	Zhang Liangji 張亮基		1858	1860	
77	Liu Yuanhao 劉源灝		1860	1861	
78	Fuqing 福清		1861	1861	
79	Pan Duo 潘鐸		1861	1863	
80	Lao Chongguang 勞崇光		1863	1867	
81	Zhang Kaisong 張凱嵩		1867	1868	
82	Liu Yuezhao 劉岳昭		1868	1875	
83	Liu Changyou 劉長佑		1875	1882	
84	Cen Yuying 岑毓英		1882	1889	
	Tan Junpei 譚鈞培		1889	1889	Acting Viceroy
85	Wang Wenshao 王文韶		1889	1894	
86	Songfan 崧蕃		1895	1900	
87	Wei Guangtao 魏光燾		1900	1902	
88	Ding Zhenduo 丁振鐸		1902	1906	
89	Cen Chunxuan 岑春煊		1906	1907	
90	Xiliang 錫良		1907	1909	
91	Li Jingxi 李經羲		1909	1911	
