= Viceroy of Liangjiang =

Regional viceroy in Qing Empire

Chinese name
- Traditional Chinese: 兩江總督
- Simplified Chinese: 两江总督
Transcriptions
Standard Mandarin
- Hanyu Pinyin: Liǎngjiāng Zǒngdū

Governor-General of the Two River Provinces and Other Local Admirals, in Charge of Military Affairs, Food and Wages, Management of Rivers, and Administration on Nanhe Affairs (full title)
- Traditional Chinese: 總督兩江等處地方提督軍務、糧饟、操江、統轄南河事務
- Simplified Chinese: 总督两江等处地方提督军务、粮饷、操江、统辖南河事务
Transcriptions

Manchu name
- Manchu script: ᡤᡳᠶᠠᠩᠨᠠᠨ ᡤᡳᠶᠠᠩᠰᡳ ᡠᡥᡝᡵᡳ ᡴᠠᡩᠠᠯᠠᡵᠠ ᠠᠮᠪᠠᠨ
- Romanization: giyangnan giyangsi uheri kadalara amban

Jurisdiction of the Viceroy of Liangjiang in 1911 (just before the abolishment of the office)

The Viceroy of Liangjiang, fully named in Chinese as the Governor-General of the Two River Provinces and Other Local Admirals, in Charge of Military Affairs, Food and Wages, Management of Rivers, and Administration on Nanhe Affairs, was one of eight regional Viceroys during the Qing dynasty. The Viceroy of Liangjiang had jurisdiction of military, civil, and political affairs over then Jiangnan Province (approx. nowadays Jiangsu, Anhui and Shanghai) and then Jiangxi Province (approx. nowadays Jiangxi). The position was set up in 1647 and abolished in 1912.

== History ==
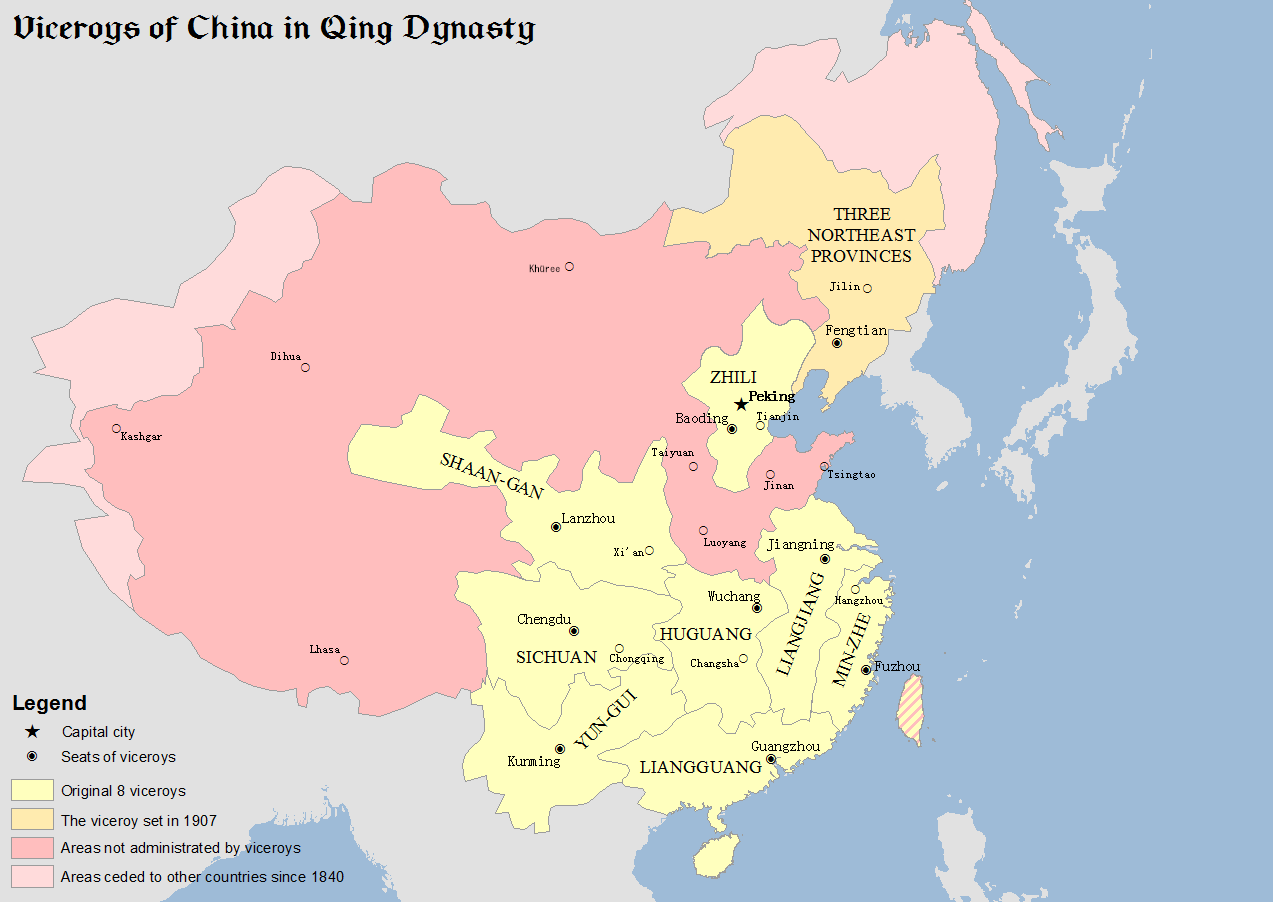
Map of viceroys in Qing Dynasty of China

The office of Viceroy of Liangjiang originated in 1647 during the reign of the Shunzhi Emperor. It was called "Viceroy of the Three Provinces of Jiangdong, Jiangxi and Henan" (江東江西河南三省總督) and headquartered in Jiangning (江寧; present-day Nanjing, Jiangsu). In 1652, the office was renamed "Viceroy of Jiangxi" (江西總督) and its headquarters shifted to Nanchang for a short while before the old system was restored.

During the reign of the Kangxi Emperor, in 1661 and 1674, two separate Viceroy offices were created for Jiangdong and Jiangxi, but they were merged under the Viceroy of Liangjiang later in 1665 and 1682 respectively. The office's name had remained as "Viceroy of Liangjiang" since then.

In 1723, the Yongzheng Emperor ordered that the Viceroy of Liangjiang would concurrently hold the appointments of Secretary of War (兵部尚書) and Right Censor-in-Chief (右都御史) of the Detection Branch (都察院) in the Censorate.

In 1831, the Daoguang Emperor put the Viceroy of Liangjiang in charge of the salt trade in the Huai River area.

During the reign of the Xianfeng Emperor, the Taiping rebels captured Jiangning (江寧; present-day Nanjing, Jiangsu) and designated it as their capital. The headquarters of the Viceroy of Liangjiang constantly shifted across different locations, including Yangzhou, Changzhou, Shanghai, Suzhou and Anqing.

In 1866, during the reign of the Tongzhi Emperor, the Viceroy of Liangjiang was also put in charge of trade and commerce in the five treaty ports. He also concurrently held the appointment of "Southern Ocean Trade Minister" (南洋通商大臣); while "Northern Ocean Trade Minister" (北洋通商大臣) was held by the Viceroy of Zhili.

After the fall of the Qing dynasty in 1912, the former headquarters of the Viceroy of Liangjiang in Nanjing was converted into a Presidential Palace for the President of the Republic of China until 1949.

== List of Viceroys of Liangjiang ==
#	Name	Portrait	Start of term	End of term	Notes
Viceroy of Jiangnan, Jiangxi and Henan (1647–1649)
1	Ma Guozhu 馬國柱		19 August 1647	30 September 1649	
Viceroy of Liangjiang (1649–1661)
2	Ma Guozhu 馬國柱		30 September 1649	30 October 1654	Left office due to illness
3	Ma Mingpei 馬鳴佩		November 1654	23 June 1656	Left office due to illness
4	Lang Tingzuo 郎廷佐		3 July 1656	2 November 1661	
Viceroy of Jiangnan (1661–1665)
5	Lang Tingzuo 郎廷佐		2 November 1661	4 July 1665	
Viceroy of Jiangxi (1661–1665)
5	Zhang Chaolin 張朝璘		2 November 1661	4 July 1665	
Viceroy of Liangjiang (1665–1911)
6	Lang Tingzuo 郎廷佐		4 July 1665	17 December 1668	Left office due to illness
7	Maleji 麻勒吉		10 January 1669	5 July 1673	Demoted by two grades and reassigned elsewhere
8	Asihi 阿席熙		29 July 1673	January 1682	Demoted
9	Yu Chenglong 于成龍		1 February 1682	24 June 1684	Died in office
10	Wang Xinming 王新命		1 July 1684	18 April 1687	Reassigned to serve as the Viceroy of Min-Zhe
11	Dong Ne 董訥		22 April 1687	24 April 1688	Demoted by five grades and reassigned elsewhere
12	Fulata 傅拉塔		5 May 1688	22 July 1694	Died in office
13	Fan Chengxun 范承勳		10 August 1694	15 November 1698	Left office for filial mourning
14	Zhang Penghe 張鵬翮		23 December 1698	28 April 1700	Reassigned to serve as the Viceroy of Caoyun
	Taodai 陶岱		30 May 1699		Stand-in as the Right Vice Secretary of Personnel
	Taodai 陶岱		28 April 1700	27 June 1700	Stand-in as the Secretary of Justice
15	Ašan 阿山		1 July 1700	24 December 1706	
16	Shaomubu 邵穆布		31 December 1706	August 1709	
17	Gali 噶禮		27 August 1709	10 March 1712	Relieved of his appointment
	Lang Tingji 郎廷極		10 March 1712	14 November 1712	Stand-in as the Provincial Governor of Jiangxi
18	Heshou 赫壽		14 November 1712	22 May 1717	Promoted to Secretary of the Board for the Administration of Outlying Regions
19	Changnai 長鼐		30 May 1717	November 1722	Died in office
20	Cabina 查弼納		27 November 1722	18 May 1726	Recalled to the imperial capital
	Fan Shiyi 范時繹		18 May 1726	12 May 1730	Stand-in as the zongbing of Malan Town
	Shi Yizhi 史貽直		12 May 1730		Stand-in as the Left Vice Secretary of Personnel
21	Gao Qizhuo 高其倬		20 June 1730	8 August 1731	Stand-in as the Viceroy of Yun-Guang
	Yengišan		8 August 1731	24 October 1732	Stand-in as the Provincial Governor of Jiangsu
	Wei Tingzhen 魏廷珍		24 October 1732	23 February 1733	Stand-in as the Viceroy of Caoyun
22	Gao Qizhuo 高其倬		23 February 1733	8 October 1733	Recalled back to the imperial capital
	Zhao Hong'en 趙宏恩		8 October 1733	18 June 1734	Stand-in as the Provincial Governor of Hunan
23	Zhao Hong'en 趙宏恩		18 June 1734	10 February 1737	Recalled to the imperial capital
24	Qingfu 慶復		10 February 1737	4 November 1737	Reassigned to serve as the Viceroy of Yun-Gui
25	Nasutu 那蘇圖		4 November 1737	5 December 1739	Left office for filial mourning
26	Hao Yulin 郝玉麟		5 December 1739	18 June 1740	Relieved of his appointment
	Yang Chaozeng 楊超曾		18 June 1740	26 September 1741	Stand-in as Secretary of War
27	Nasutu 那蘇圖		26 September 1741	9 May 1742	Reassigned to serve as the Viceroy of Min-Zhe
28	Depei 德沛		9 May 1742	11 March 1743	Recalled to the imperial capital
29	Yengišan 尹繼善		11 March 1743	28 October 1748	
30	Ts'ereng 策楞		28 October 1748	11 January 1749	Reassigned to serve as the Viceroy of Chuan-Shaan
	Yarhašan 雅爾哈善		11 January 1749	25 January 1749	Stand-in
31	Huang Tinggui 黃廷桂		25 January 1749	25 July 1751	Reassigned to serve as the Viceroy of Shaan-Gan
32	Yengišan 尹繼善		25 July 1751	16 October 1753	
	Zhuang Yougong 莊有恭		11 November 1752		Stand-in as Provincial Governor of Jiangsu
	Erong'an 鄂容安		24 February 1753	16 October 1753	Stand-in as Provincial Governor of Jiangxi
33	Erong'an 鄂容安		16 October 1753	1755	Killed in battle
	Yengišan 尹繼善		26 September 1754	29 November 1756	Stand-in as Viceroy of Southern Rivers
34	Yengišan 尹繼善		29 November 1756	9 May 1765	Reassigned to the Imperial Cabinet
35	Gao Jin 高晉		9 May 1765	25 February 1779	Died in office
36	Sazai 薩載		25 February 1779	21 September 1780	Left office for filial mourning
37	Chen Huizu 陳輝祖		21 September 1780	January 1781	
	Sazai 薩載		January 1781	17 February 1783	Acting Viceroy of Liangjiang
38	Sazai 薩載		17 February 1783	10 April 1786	Died in office
39	Li Shijie 李世傑		10 April 1786	30 December 1787	Reassigned to serve as the Viceroy of Sichuan
	Min Eyuan 閔鶚元		11 April 1786		Stand-in as the Provincial Governor of Jiangsu
40	Shulin 書麟		11 April 1786	11 July 1790	Dismissed from office
	Fusong 福崧		11 July 1790		Stand-in as the Provincial Governor of Jiangsu
41	Sun Shiyi 孫士毅		14 July 1790	25 May 1791	Promoted to Secretary of Personnel
	Changlin 長麟		25 May 1791		Stand-in as Provincial Governor of Jiangsu
42	Shulin 書麟		25 May 1791	14 August 1794	Dismissed from office
43	Fugang 富綱		14 August 1794	23 January 1795	Demoted
	Suringga 蘇凌阿		14 August 1794		Stand-in as Secretary of Justice
44	Funing 福寧		23 January 1795	2 August 1796	Reassigned to serve as the Viceroy of Sichuan
	Suringga 蘇凌阿		2 August 1796	6 November 1797	Stand-in as Secretary of Justice
45	Li Fenghan 李奉翰		6 November 1797	18 March 1799	Died in office
46	Fei Chun 費淳		18 March 1799	12 August 1803	Reassigned to serve as Secretary of War
47	Chen Dawen 陳大文		12 August 1803	25 February 1805	Reassigned to serve as Left Censor-in-Chief
48	Tiebao 鐵保		25 February 1805	24 August 1809	Dismissed from office
49	Alinbao 阿林保		24 August 1809	11 January 1810	Died in office
50	Songyun 松筠		11 January 1810	26 February 1811	Reassigned to serve as the Viceroy of Liangguang
51	Lebao 勒保		26 February 1811	27 July 1811	Recalled back to the imperial capital
52	Bailing 百齡		27 July 1811	25 December 1816	
	Songyun 松筠		1 December 1816		Stand-in as Grand Secretary
53	Sun Yuting 孫玉庭		25 December 1816	9 September 1824	Promoted to Grand Secretary of Tiren Cabinet (體仁閣大學士)
54	Wei Yuan 魏元煜		28 January 1825	7 July 1825	Reassigned to serve as Viceroy of Caoyun
55	Qishan 琦善		7 July 1825	5 June 1827	Dismissed from office
	Jiang Youxian 蔣攸銛		19 April 1827	5 June 1827	Stand-in as Grand Secretary of Tiren Cabinet (體仁閣大學士)
56	Jiang Youxian 蔣攸銛		5 June 1827	11 October 1830	Recalled to the imperial capital
	Tao Zhu 陶澍		24 July 1830	11 October 1830	Stand-in as Provincial Governor of Jiangsu
57	Tao Zhu 陶澍		11 October 1830	22 April 1839	Left office due to illness
58	Lin Zexu 林則徐		22 April 1839		Reassigned to serve as Viceroy of Liangguang before he assumed office
	Chen Luan 陳鑾		22 April 1839	5 January 1840	Stand-in as Provincial Governor of Jiangsu
59	Deng Tingzhen 鄧廷楨		5 January 1840		Reassigned to serve as Viceroy of Yun-Gui before he assumed office
60	Ilibu 伊里布		21 January 1840	3 May 1841	Recalled to the imperial capital
	Linqing 麟慶		21 January 1840		Stand-in as Viceroy of Caoyun
	Yuqian 裕謙		6 August 1840	10 February 1841	Stand-in as Provincial Governor of Jiangsu
61	Yuqian 裕謙		3 May 1841	22 October 1841	Died in office
	Niu Jian 牛鑑		19 October 1841	17 October 1842	Stand-in as Provincial Governor of Henan
62	Qiying 耆英		17 October 1842	19 March 1844	
	Bichang 璧昌		6 April 1843	1 December 1843	Stand-in as General of Fuzhou
	Sun Shanbao 孫善寶		6 April 1843	1 December 1843	Stand-in as Provincial Governor of Jiangsu
	Bichang 璧昌		19 March 1844	21 January 1845	Stand-in as General of Fuzhou
	Sun Shanbao 孫善寶		19 March 1844	21 January 1845	Stand-in as Provincial Governor of Jiangsu
63	Bichang 璧昌		21 January 1845	30 April 1847	Promoted to Interior Minister
	Lu Jianying 陸建瀛		8 March 1847	30 April 1847	Stand-in as Provincial Governor of Jiangsu
64	Li Xingyuan 李星沅		30 April 1847	26 April 1849	Left office due to illness
65	Lu Jianying 陸建瀛		26 April 1849	6 March 1853	Dismissed from office
	Xianghou 祥厚		6 March 1853	31 March 1853	Stand-in as General of Jiangning
	Yang Wending 楊文定		31 March 1853	27 May 1853	Stand-in as Provincial Governor of Jiangsu
66	Yiliang 怡良		27 March 1853	5 May 1857	
	Zhao Dezhe 趙德轍		5 May 1857		Stand-in as Provincial Governor of Jiangsu
	He Guiqing 何桂清		5 May 1857	26 July 1857	Stand-in as former Provincial Governor of Zhejiang
67	He Guiqing 何桂清		26 July 1857	8 June 1860	Dismissed from office
	Zeng Guofan 曾國藩		8 June 1860	10 August 1860	Stand-in as former Vice Secretary of War
	Xu Youren 徐有壬		8 June 1860	18 June 1860	Stand-in as Provincial Governor of Jiangsu; killed in battle
	Xue Huan 薛煥		18 June 1860		Stand-in as Lieutenant-Governor of Jiangsu
68	Zeng Guofan 曾國藩		10 August 1860	6 September 1868	Reassigned to serve as Viceroy of Zhili
	Li Hongzhang 李鴻章		23 May 1865	7 December 1866	Stand-in as Provincial Governor of Jiangsu
69	Ma Xinyi 馬新貽		6 September 1868	29 August 1870	Assassinated in office
	Kuiyu 魁玉		29 August 1870		Stand-in as General of Jiangning
70	Zeng Guofan 曾國藩		29 August 1870	20 March 1872	Died in office
	He Jing 何璟		20 March 1872	25 November 1872	Stand-in as Provincial Governor of Jiangsu
	Zhang Shusheng 張樹聲		25 November 1872	3 February 1873	Stand-in as Provincial Governor of Jiangsu
71	Li Zongxi 李宗羲		3 February 1873	12 January 1875	Left office due to illness
	Liu Kunyi 劉坤一		12 January 1875	1 September 1875	Stand-in as Provincial Governor of Jiangxi
72	Shen Baozhen 沈葆楨		30 May 1875	26 December 1879	Died in office
	Wu Yuanbing 吳元炳		28 March 1878		Stand-in as Provincial Governor of Jiangsu
	Wu Yuanbing 吳元炳		26 December 1879	July 1880	Stand-in as Provincial Governor of Jiangsu
73	Liu Kunyi 劉坤一		27 December 1879	22 August 1881	Recalled to the imperial capital
74	Peng Yulin 彭玉麟		22 August 1881	28 October 1881	Dismissed from office
75	Zuo Zongtang 左宗棠		28 October 1881	8 February 1884	Left office due to illness
	Yulu 裕祿		8 February 1884		Stand-in as Provincial Governor of Anhui; never assumed office
	Zeng Guoquan 曾國荃		16 February 1884	6 September 1887	Stand-in as Secretary of Rites
	Yulu 裕祿		6 September 1887	October 1887	Stand-in as Viceroy of Huguang
	Zeng Guoquan 曾國荃		October 1887	22 November 1890	Acting Viceroy of Liangjiang
	Shen Bingcheng 沈秉成		22 November 1890		Stand-in as Provincial Governor of Anhui
76	Liu Kunyi 劉坤一		22 November 1890	7 October 1902	Died in office
	Zhang Zhidong 張之洞		2 November 1894	2 January 1896	Stand-in as Viceroy of Huguang
	Lu Chuanlin 鹿傳霖		24 December 1899	3 May 1900	Stand-in as Provincial Governor of Jiangsu
	Li Youfen 李有棻		7 October 1902		Stand-in as Lieutenant-Governor of Jiangning
	Zhang Zhidong 張之洞		7 October 1902	20 March 1903	Stand-in as Viceroy of Huguang
77	Wei Guangtao 魏光燾		5 December 1902	1 September 1904	Reassigned to serve as Viceroy of Min-Zhe
78	Li Xingrui 李興銳		1 September 1904	31 October 1904	Died in office
79	Zhou Fu 周馥		31 October 1904	2 September 1906	Reassigned to serve as the Viceroy of Min-Zhe
	Duanfang 端方		31 October 1904	2 September 1906	Stand-in as Provincial Governor of Jiangsu
80	Duanfang 端方		2 September 1906	28 June 1909	Reassigned to serve as Viceroy of Zhili
	Fan Zengxiang 樊增祥		28 June 1909		Stand-in as Lieutenant-Governor of Jiangning
81	Zhang Renjun 張人駿		28 June 1909	23 January 1912	Dismissed from office
	Zhang Xun 張勳		23 January 1912		Stand-in as Provincial Military Commander of Jiangnan
