= Viceroy of Southern Rivers =

Government official in Qing Empire

- Traditional Chinese: 江南河道總督
- Simplified Chinese: 江南河道总督
Transcriptions
Standard Mandarin
- Hanyu Pinyin: Jiāngnán Hédào Zǒngdū

Viceroy of Rivers and Waterways in Jiangnan Overseeing Military Affairs (full title)
- Traditional Chinese: 總督江南河道提督軍務
- Simplified Chinese: 总督江南河道提督军务
Transcriptions
Standard Mandarin
- Hanyu Pinyin: Zǒngdū Jiāngnán Hédào Tídū Jūnwù

Viceroy of Southern Rivers and Waterways (simplified title)
- Traditional Chinese: 南河河道總督
- Simplified Chinese: 南河河道总督
Transcriptions
Standard Mandarin
- Hanyu Pinyin: Nánhé Hédào Zǒngdū

Viceroy of Southern Rivers (simplified title)
- Traditional Chinese: 南河總督
- Simplified Chinese: 南河总督
Transcriptions
Standard Mandarin
- Hanyu Pinyin: Nánhé Zǒngdū

The Viceroy of Rivers and Waterways in Jiangnan Overseeing Military Affairs, better known simply as the Viceroy of Southern Rivers or Viceroy of Southern Rivers and Waterways, was a government office in China proper during the Qing dynasty. The office was based in Qingjiangpu (清江浦), which is now a district of Huai'an City, Jiangsu Province. The Viceroy usually held the rank of a deputy first-grade official or a regular second-grade official. The Viceroy was in charge of dredging and embankment projects in the waterways of Jiangsu Province.

== History ==
The office of Viceroy of Rivers and Waterways was created in the early Qing dynasty. In 1677, during the reign of the Kangxi Emperor, Jin Fu (t 靳輔, s 靳辅, Jìn Fǔ, 1633–1692) served as the Viceroy of Rivers and Waterways and his headquarters were in Jining, Shandong Province. As Huai'an, Jiangsu Province was near the intersection of the Yellow River, Huai River and Grand Canal, the waterworks in that area became of prime importance. Since the Viceroy's office was too far away from Huai'an, the Qing government created a separate branch for the Viceroy's office at the northwest of Qingjiangpu (清江浦; a district of present-day Huai'an, Jiangsu Province) to facilitate the Viceroy's job of overseeing the waterworks.

In 1729, the Yongzheng Emperor split the Viceroy of Rivers and Waterways into the Viceroy of Southern Rivers based in Qingjiangpu, and the Viceroy of Eastern Rivers based in Jining. In the following year, he created the Viceroy of Northern Rivers, which was then concurrently held by the Viceroy of Zhili. The Viceroy of Southern Rivers oversaw a total of four circuits, 24 subprefectures and 24 battalions of military forces.

In the early Qing dynasty, the central government provided an annual amount of 4.5 million silver taels to the Viceroy of Southern Rivers for construction and maintenance projects. When the rivers overflowed, the central government provided additional funds to the Viceroy. At the same time, numerous instances of corruption occurred when the Viceroy and his subordinates embezzled the funds and produced work of substandard quality. The area around Qingjiangpu developed rapidly and became a thriving centre of commerce, business and recreation, with dozens of streets filled with rows of shops, restaurants, teahouses, bathhouses and brothels.

In 1855, the Xianfeng Emperor ordered the Yellow River to be redirected northward from Lanyi County, Henan Province towards Changyuan County, Dongming County and Zhangqiu Town in Shandong Province, and then from the Ji River in Shandong Province towards the Bohai Sea.

In 1860, the Nian rebels attacked and captured Qingjiangpu from government forces and then burnt down the Viceroy's office and the surrounding areas. The Qing government abolished the Viceroy of Southern Rivers in the following year.

As of today, the garden of the Viceroy's office has been restored and is now known as Qing Yan Garden.

== List of Viceroys of Southern Rivers ==
#	Name	Portrait	Start of term	End of term	Notes
	Yengišan 尹繼善		March 1729	April 1729	Acting Viceroy
1	Kong Yuxun 孔毓珣		April 1729	May 1730	Died in office
	Kang Hongxun 康弘勳		1730	1730	Acting Viceroy
	Ji Zengyun 嵇曾筠		May 1730	January 1734	Acting Viceroy; left office for filial mourning
	Ji Zengyun 嵇曾筠		1734	1734	
2	Gao Bin 高斌		1734	1734	Concurrently held the appointment of Salt Commissioner of the Two Huais
	Zhao Hong'en 趙宏恩		1735	1735	Acting Viceroy
3	Gao Bin 高斌		January 1736	September 1741	
	Bai Zhongshan 白鍾山		January 1735	December 1736	As Deputy Viceroy
	Liu Yongcheng 劉永澄		January 1735	December 1736	As Deputy Viceroy; later as acting Viceroy for a year
	De'ermin 德爾敏		December 1736	January 1738	As Deputy Viceroy; later as acting Viceroy for two years
	Sun Jun 孫鈞		1740	1741	As Financial Officer of Southern Rivers
4	Wanyan Wei 完顏偉		September 1741	January 1743	
5	Bai Zhongshan 白鍾山		January 1743	April 1746	
6	Zhou Xuejian 周學健		October 1746	August 1748	
	Gu Cong 顧琮		April 1746	October 1746	As Viceroy of Caoyun
	Gao Bin 高斌		August 1748	September 1753	Acting Viceroy
	Zhang Shizai 張師載		1750	September 1753	Acting Viceroy
	Celeng 策楞		September 1753	October 1753	Acting Viceroy
	Bai Zhongshan 白鍾山		1753	1754	Acting Viceroy
7	Yengišan 尹繼善		October 1753	January 1755	
	Bai Zhongshan 白鍾山		1755	1755	As Viceroy of Eastern Rivers
8	Fulehe 富勒赫		January 1755	November 1756	
9	Liu Tongxun 劉統勳		November 1756		Aibilong was acting Viceroy before Liu Tongxun arrived to assume office
	Zhuang Yougong 莊有恭		1756	1757	As Provincial Governor of Jiangsu
10	Aibilong 愛必達		November 1756	February 1757	
11	Bai Zhongshan 白鍾山		February 1757	April 1761	
	Ji Huang 嵇璜		February 1757	April 1761	As Deputy Viceroy
12	Gao Jin 高晉		April 1761	April 1765	
13	Li Hong 李宏		April 1765	September 1771	Died in office
14	Wu Sijue 吳嗣爵		September 1771	April 1776	Died in office
15	Sazai 薩載		April 1776	February 1779	
	Debao 德保		1777	1777	Acting Viceroy
	Li Fenghan 李奉翰		February 1779	March 1780	Acting Viceroy
16	Chen Huizu 陳輝祖		March 1780	January 1781	
	Li Fenghan 李奉翰		January 1781	February 1781	Acting Viceroy
17	Li Fenghan 李奉翰		February 1781	March 1789	
	Kang Jitian 康基田		March 1789	April 1789	Acting Viceroy
18	Lan Dixi 蘭第錫		April 1789	January 1798	Died in office
	Li Fenghan 李奉翰		January 1798	January 1798	Acting Viceroy
19	Kang Jitian 康基田		January 1798	March 1800	
20	Wu Jing 吳璥		March 1800	January 1805	
21	Xu Rui 徐端		January 1805	July 1806	Became Deputy Viceroy from July 1806
22	Dai Junyuan 戴均元		July 1806	April 1808	
	Xu Rui 徐端		July 1806	April 1808	As Deputy Viceroy
	Nayancheng 那彥成		January 1809	February 1809	As Deputy Viceroy
	Xu Rui 徐端		April 1808	January 1809	Acting Viceroy
23	Wu Jing 吳璥		January 1809	August 1810	Left office due to illness
	Xu Rui 徐端		February 1809	August 1810	As Deputy Viceroy
24	Xu Rui 徐端		August 1810	December 1810	
	Xu Rui 徐端		December 1810	August 1811	As Deputy Viceroy
25	Jiang Youxian 蔣攸銛		December 1810	January 1811	
	Songyun 松筠		January 1811	January 1811	Acting Viceroy
26	Chen Fengxiang 陳鳳翔		January 1811	September 1812	
	Chu Pengling 初彭齡		September 1812	September 1812	Acting Viceroy
27	Li Shixu 黎世序		September 1812	March 1824	Died in office
	Sun Yuting 孫玉庭		1821	1821	Acting Viceroy
	Sun Yuting 孫玉庭		1824	1824	Acting Viceroy
28	Zhang Wenhao 張文浩		March 1824	December 1824	Demoted and chained to construction site for a month due to mismanagement, banished to the Xinjiang border patrol, d. 1836
29	Yan Lang 嚴烺		December 1824	April 1826	
30	Zhang Jing 張井		April 1826	April 1833	Left office due to illness
	Pan Xi'en 潘錫恩		May 1826	May 1829	As Deputy Viceroy
31	Linqing 麟慶		April 1833	September 1842	Temporarily left office for filial mourning from May to September 1833
	Zhang Jing 張井		May 1833	September 1833	Acting Viceroy in Linqing's absence
	Chen Luan 陳鑾		1839	1839	Acting Viceroy
32	Pan Xi'en 潘錫恩		September 1842	October 1848	Left office due to illness
	Liao Hongquan 廖鴻荃		1842	1842	As Secretary of Works
	Zhou Tianjue 周天爵		1842	1842	Acting Viceroy
	Li Xingyuan 李星沅		October 1848	October 1848	Acting Viceroy
33	Yang Yizeng 楊以增		October 1848	February 1856	Died in office
	Shao Can 邵燦		February 1856	February 1856	As Viceroy of Caoyun
34	Gengchang 庚長		February 1856	June 1860	
	Wang Mengling 王夢齡		June 1860	July 1860	Acting Viceroy
