= Sazai =

Sazai (薩載; 1720–1786), courtesy name Hou'an (厚菴), was a Manchu official of the Irgen Gioro clan and the Plain Yellow Banner. He served as Viceroys of Southern Rivers and Liangjiang, and was noted for his expertise in hydraulic engineering and flood control.

== Biography ==
The son of Sahadai, a Manchu Deputy Commander of the Bordered Blue Banner (滿洲鑲藍旗副都統), Sazai entered official service as a translation juren (繙譯擧人) graduate and promoted from a clerk in the Court of Colonial Affairs (理藩院) to become Provincial Governor of Jiangsu. In 1776 he was appointed Viceroy of Southern Rivers, overseeing flood-control projects on the Yellow River, the Grand Canal, and Hongze Lake. He is best known for directing the Taozhuang diversion canal project, which helped prevent Yellow River backflow and improved river management. In recognition of his achievements, the Qianlong Emperor granted him the hereditary noble rank of Qiduwei (騎都尉, "Knight Commandant"). He later served as Viceroy of Liangjiang and continued to supervise major hydraulic works. He died in 1786 after requesting retirement due to illness. Posthumously, he was awarded the title Taizi Taibao (太子太保, "Grand Protector of Crown Prince") and the posthumous name Chengke (誠恪, "Sincere and Reverent").
