= Ma Xinyi =

Hui Muslim official and military general

Viceroy of Liangjiang
- In office 6 September 1868 – 23 August 1870
- Preceded by: Zeng Guofan
- Succeeded by: Zeng Guofan

Viceroy of Min-Zhe
- In office 12 January 1868 – 6 September 1868
- Preceded by: Wu Tang
- Succeeded by: Yin Gui

Personal details
- Born: November 3, 1821 Heze, Shandong, Qing China
- Died: August 23, 1870 (aged 48) Jiangning, Jiangsu, Qing China
- Education: Jinshi degree in the Imperial Examination

Ma Xinyi (Xiao'erjing: ﻣَﺎ سٍ ىِ, traditional Chinese: 馬新貽; simplified Chinese: 马新贻; pinyin: Mǎ Xīnyí; Wade–Giles: Ma Hsin-I; November 3, 1821–August 23, 1870), courtesy name Gushan (穀山), art names Yanmen (燕門) and Tiefang (鐵舫), posthumous name Duanmin (端敏), was a Chinese Muslim (ethnic Hui) official and military general of the Qing dynasty of China.

Along with other prominent figures, including Hu Linyi and Guanwen, Ma raised the Green Standard Army to fight against the Taiping Rebellion and restore the stability of Qing dynasty. This set the scene for the era later known as the Tongzhi Restoration. His assassination symbolized the serious conflict between the Xiang Army and the Green Standard Army, both of which fought for the Qing dynasty.

== Early life ==
Born as a native of Heze, Shandong (荷澤) in 1821, he had successfully passed the imperial examinations at the age of 26 (1847), a prestigious achievement in China. He earned the Jinshi degree, the highest level in the civil service examinations, which led to his appointment to the Hanlin Academy, a body of outstanding Chinese literary scholars who performed literary tasks for the imperial court.

== Assassination ==
Ma Xinyi was later appointed as the governor-general of Liangjiang, a region comprising the provinces of Jiangxi, Anhui and Jiangsu in 1868. He proved to be an able administrator, distinguishing himself with his capability to manage tensions with foreigners. This was demonstrated when Ma Xinyi addressed the problem of kidnapping in his area, which effectively averted anti-foreign riots, particularly in the area of the Yangzi delta.

Two years later, in 1870, Ma Xinyi was assassinated and his killer was immediately caught. The assassin was identified as Wan Qingxuan (Zhang Wenxiang), who was executed in the marketplace after a trial presided by Wan Qingxuan of Nanchang. Some sources state that he was the governor's former companion. Many historical rumours implicated the Empress Dowager Cixi in Ma Xinyi's death. This is aligned with the speculation that Ma Xinyi's assassination was due to the conflict between the imperial army and the Xiang militia, the group that played an important role in the suppression of the Taiping Rebellion.

Government offices
Preceded by Wu Tang	Viceroy of MinZhe; 1867–1868	Succeeded by Yinggui
Preceded by Zeng Guofan	Viceroy of Liangjiang; 1868–1870	Succeeded by Zeng Guofan
