= Mangguli =

Mangguli (Manchu: ᠮᠠᠩᡤᡠᠯᡳ, romanized: Mangguli; 1672–1736) was a Qing official of the Irgen Gioro clan of Yehe and assigned to the Manchu Bordered Yellow Banner. He served in a number of high-ranking positions, including Deputy Ministers of War, Rites, Justice, and the Court of Colonial Affairs, Governor of Gansu, and Acting Minister of Works. He was also noted for his accomplishments as a skillful painter.

== Biography ==
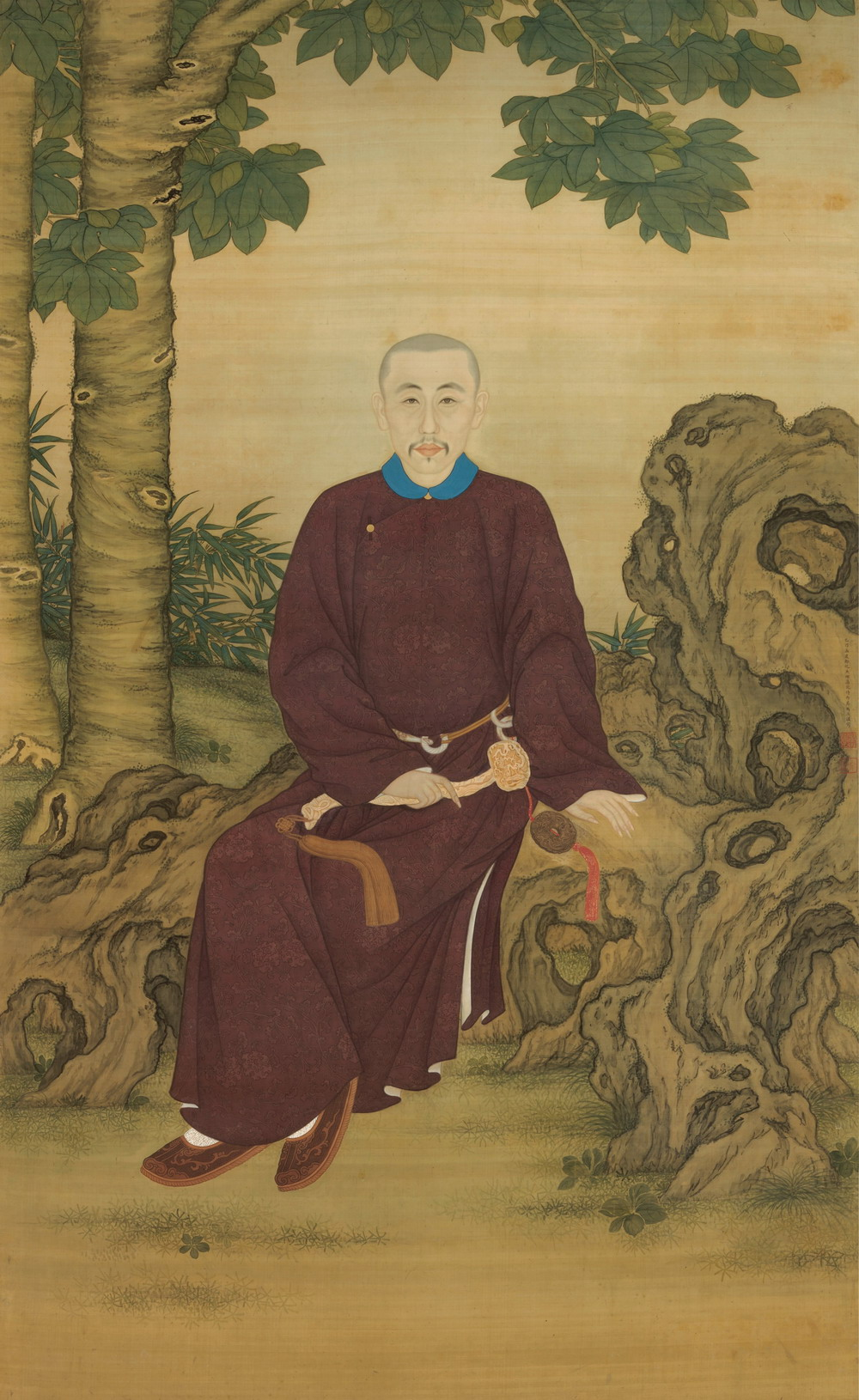
One of Mangguli's best-known paintings, the Portrait of Yunli, is currently preserved in the Nelson-Atkins Museum of Art

Mangguli's great-grandfather Fulata joined the Manchu Khanate during the Hong Taiji era, and was originally assigned to the Mongol Plain Blue Banner. His grandfather Manggitu distinguished himself in the wars preceding the Qing conquest of China and reached to the position of Deputy Commander of the Manchu Plain Blue Banner, receiving the hereditary rank of Third-Class Light Chariot Commandant (輕車都尉). Mangguli began his career as a bithe-si (imperial secretarial clerk) in the Court of Colonial Affairs and later served as Assistant to the Deputy Minister of the Court and as an inspector general. He was highly skilled in painting and was commissioned to paint a portrait of the Kangxi Emperor. In 1723, he was transferred to the Manchu Bordered Yellow Banner and a separate banner company (niru) was established for members of his clan, where he served as the first commander.

He subsequently served as Commissioner of the Changlu Salt Administration, Minister of the Court of Judicial Review, and Deputy Minister of War, while continuing to supervise salt affairs. During discussions on upgrading Tianjin from a military post (衛) to a prefectural-level administrative area, Mangguli proposed reorganizing it as a directly administered sub-prefecture and incorporating Wuqing, Jinghai, and Qingxian into its jurisdiction. He also submitted opinions regarding the reform of incorporating the poll tax into the land tax, and his recommendations were adopted by the court. In 1726, the court sent the Inspector Gucong to inspect the salt administration with Mangguli being responsible for overall supervision. Shortly afterward, he was transferred to the Minister of Rites and ordered, together with Gu Cong, to oversee the construction of naval barracks in Tianjin. Because the project remained unfinished for an extended period, the Yongzheng Emperor reprimanded him, transferred him to the Board of Justice, and recalled him to Beijing.

In 1727, Mangguli was reassigned to the Minister of Rites while retaining his post in the Changlu Salt Administration and was appointed Governor of Gansu. In 1728, when Qing forces marched into Tibet, the Yongzheng Emperor ordered him to proceed to Xining to manage related affairs. During this period, Liu Zhizhen, a local official in Xining, were impeached by Viceroy Yue Zhongqi for delaying military operations. As a result, the emperor also reprimanded Mangguli as supervisor, removed him from the governorship, and recalled him to Beijing. He subsequently served as acting Deputy Commander of the Manchu Plain Blue Banner and concurrently as Deputy Minister of the Court of Colonial Affairs. Thereafter, he held the offices of Commander of the Mongol Plain Blue Banner, Commander of the Manchu Bordered White Banner, Acting Minister of Works, and Commander of the Manchu Plain Blue Banner. Mangguli died of illness in 1736. The Qing court granted him state funeral honors and posthumously awarded him the honorific name Qinmin (勤敏, “Diligent and Accomplished”).
