= Guancheng =

Guancheng may refer to:

- Guancheng Hui District (管城回族区), Zhengzhou
- Guancheng District, Dongguan (莞城区), Guangdong
- Guancheng, Pingnan County, Guangxi (官成镇), town
- Guancheng, Guan County (冠城镇), town in Shandong
- Guancheng, Shen County (观城镇), town in Shandong
- Sichuan Guancheng, Chinese Football Association Jia A League and Chinese Super League Club
- Fang Guancheng, a Chinese Noble and high government official of the Qing Dynasty
