= Wang Wenshao =

- 王文韶
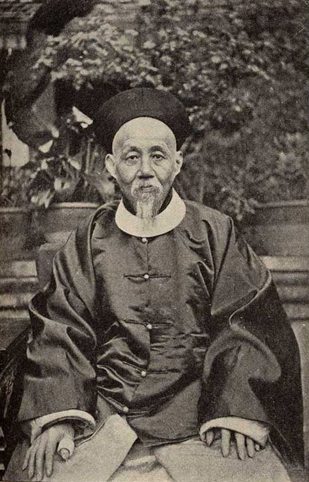
- Wang c. 1890s

Grand Councillor
- In office 23 June 1898 – 30 June 1905
- In office 8 March 1878 – December 1882

Minister of Revenue
- In office 23 June 1898 – 6 December 1900 Serving with Jingxin
- Preceded by: Weng Tonghe
- Succeeded by: Lu Chuanlin

Viceroy of Zhili
- In office 13 February 1895 – 23 June 1898
- Preceded by: Li Hongzhang
- Succeeded by: Ronglu

Viceroy of Yun-Gui
- In office 30 June 1889 – 3 October 1894
Other portfolios
Preceded by	Tan Junpei
Succeeded by	Songfan
Grand Secretary of the Wuying Hall
In office 30 May 1903 – 21 June 1907
Grand Secretary of the Wuying Hall
In office 2 February 1902 – 30 May 1903
Grand Secretary of the Tiren Library
In office 15 December 1900 – 2 February 1902
Assistant Grand Secretary
In office 27 December 1899 – 6 December 1900
Minister of Prime Minister's Office
In office 23 June 1898 – 24 July 1901

Personal details
- Born: 21 October 1832 Jiading, Suzhou, China
- Died: 31 December 1908 (aged 76) China

Military service
- Allegiance: Qing dynasty
- Branch: Chu Army
- Years of service: 1858–1907
- Battles/wars: Miao Rebellion; Nian Rebellion; First Dungan Revolt; Second Dungan Revolt

Wang Wenshao (Chinese: 王文韶; 21 October 1832 – 31 December 1908) (Note: Courtesy name Kuishi (Chinese: 夔石), posthumous name Wenqin (Chinese: 文勤)) was a Chinese political and military figure in the late Qing dynasty who supported Westernization reform.

== Early life ==
Wang was born in Jiading, Suzhou on 21 October 1832 to a family in poverty. His family had moved from Shangyu in Zhejiang to Hangzhou during the Ming dynasty. Wang's grandfather was a salt merchant.^{:257}

Wang passed the provincial imperial examination in 1851. A year later, he passed the palace examination and became a jinshi, and was offered a post at the Ministry of Revenue. He was then promoted and served at a circuit in Hubei. His achievements were recognised by statesmen including Zuo Zongtang, whom he deeply admired,^{:1-4} and Li Hongzhang. He became an aide to Zuo during the Dungan Revolt and the Nian Rebellion, responsible for overseeing the supply lines in Shaanxi and Gansu. Wang became the justice secretary of Hubei and chief secretary of Hunan, before rising to Governor of Hunan in 1871.

Wang led the imperial army to defeat the Miao Rebellion by 1872; Wang sympathised with the rebels and did not fully agree with the court, but decided to press ahead with crushing the rebellion.^{:315-20} After that, Wang took up the position as deputy minister of war as well as one of the Grand Councillors.^{:315-20} Wang was then appointed deputy minister of rites and a minister without portfolio at Prime Minister's Office. In 1889 he was named Viceroy of Yun-Gui, suppressing the Second Dungan Revolt during his time in office.

== Westernization reform ==
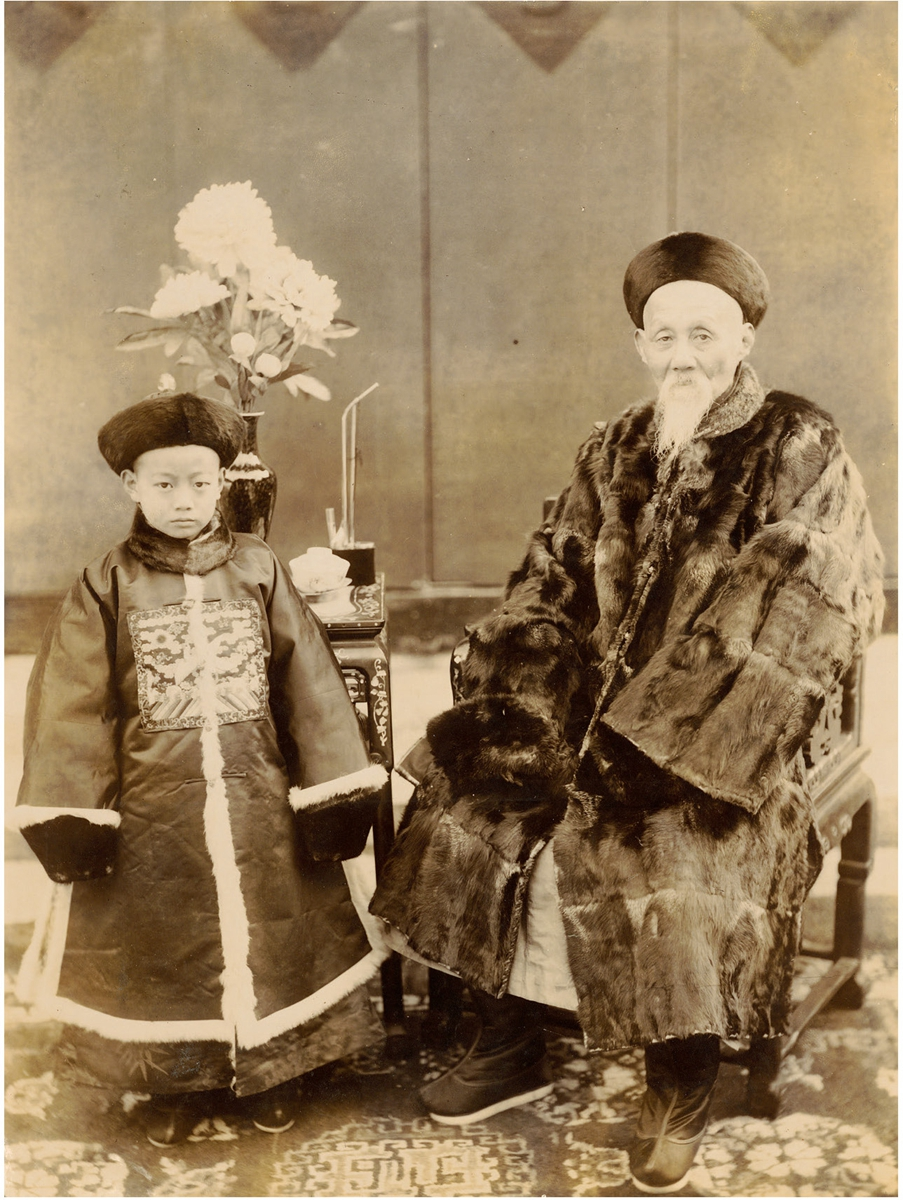
Wang with an unidentified child

Wang had corresponded with Western diplomats in his early career. He was open to Western culture and was willing to listen to the opinions of Western diplomats. During a tour of a U.S. warship, he admitted that it is impossible for China to compete with "such a dignified military system and such a magnificent armament".^{:8} He disagreed with Lin Zexu's style, thinking it to be too stubborn and ignorant towards the broader picture.

After the First Sino-Japanese War, he served as Viceroy of Zhili and minister of Beiyang. As part of Self-Strengthening Movement, he dismissed redundant soldiers, set up a naval and military academy, reformed the canals, and opened up mines. Wang also supported the construction of the Beijing–Hankou railway, Peiyang University Main Hall, railway academy, and other institutions.

In 1898, he rose to the rank of Minister of Revenue and Assistant Grand Secretary. He opposed provoking the foreign nations during the Boxer Rebellion and was the sole Grand Concillor that escorted the imperial family to Xi'an after the siege of Peking by International Legations, for which he was promoted to Grand Secretary of the Tiren Library. He advocated compromise with the foreign nations, and he later served with various duties including Grand Councillor with special duties on foreign affairs and on roads and mines, and was appointed Grand Secretary of the Wenyuan Library and later of the Wuying Hall. Wang retired in 1907 on health grounds and lived in Hangzhou.

== Personal life ==
Wang was nicknamed "The Glazed Egg" for his smooth and tactful handling of state affairs to avoid confrontation. Wang died on 31 December 1908. His residence, now known as the Mansion of Grand Secretary Wang Wenshao, is a protected cultural heritage of Hangzhou and is used by the Xiling Seal Art Society.
