= Lu Jianying =

Chinese politician (1776–1853)

Viceroy of Liangjiang
- In office 26 April 1849 – 6 March 1853
- Preceded by: Li Xingyuan
- Succeeded by: Xianghou (acting)
- In office 8 March – 30 April 1847 (acting)
- Preceded by: Bichang
- Succeeded by: Li Xingyuan

Governor of Jiangsu
- In office 12 October 1846 – 26 April 1849
- Preceded by: Li Xingyuan
- Succeeded by: Fu Shengxun

Governor of Yunnan
- In office 21 February – 12 October 1846
- Preceded by: Liang Ehan
- Succeeded by: Zhang Rizhen

Personal details
- Born: 1776 Mianyang, Hubei (present-day Xiantao)
- Died: March 19, 1853 (aged 76–77) Nanjing
- Education: Jinshi degree in the Imperial Examination (1822)
- Occupation: politician, general
- Courtesy name: Lifu (立夫), Zhongbai (仲白)

Lu Jianying (Chinese: 陸建瀛; 1776 – 19 March 1853) was the Viceroy of Liangjiang from early 1849 until early 1853. When the Taiping Rebellion army occupied Nanjing on 19 March, Lu Jianying was killed by the Taiping. Lu was the second to be killed (the first was the Viceroy of Huguang in early 1853) and a few of the highest rank governors killed in action in the Qing dynasty. When Beijing knew of Lu's death and the loss of Nanjing, they chose to impeach Lu in order to place the blame on him, saying he was incapable of commanding the battle.

== See also ==
- Draft History of Qing
- Battle of Nanjing (1853)

Government offices
Preceded by Li Xingyuan	Viceroy of Liangjiang; 1849─1853	Succeeded by Yiliang
