= Tomb of Zeng Guofan =

- 曾国藩墓
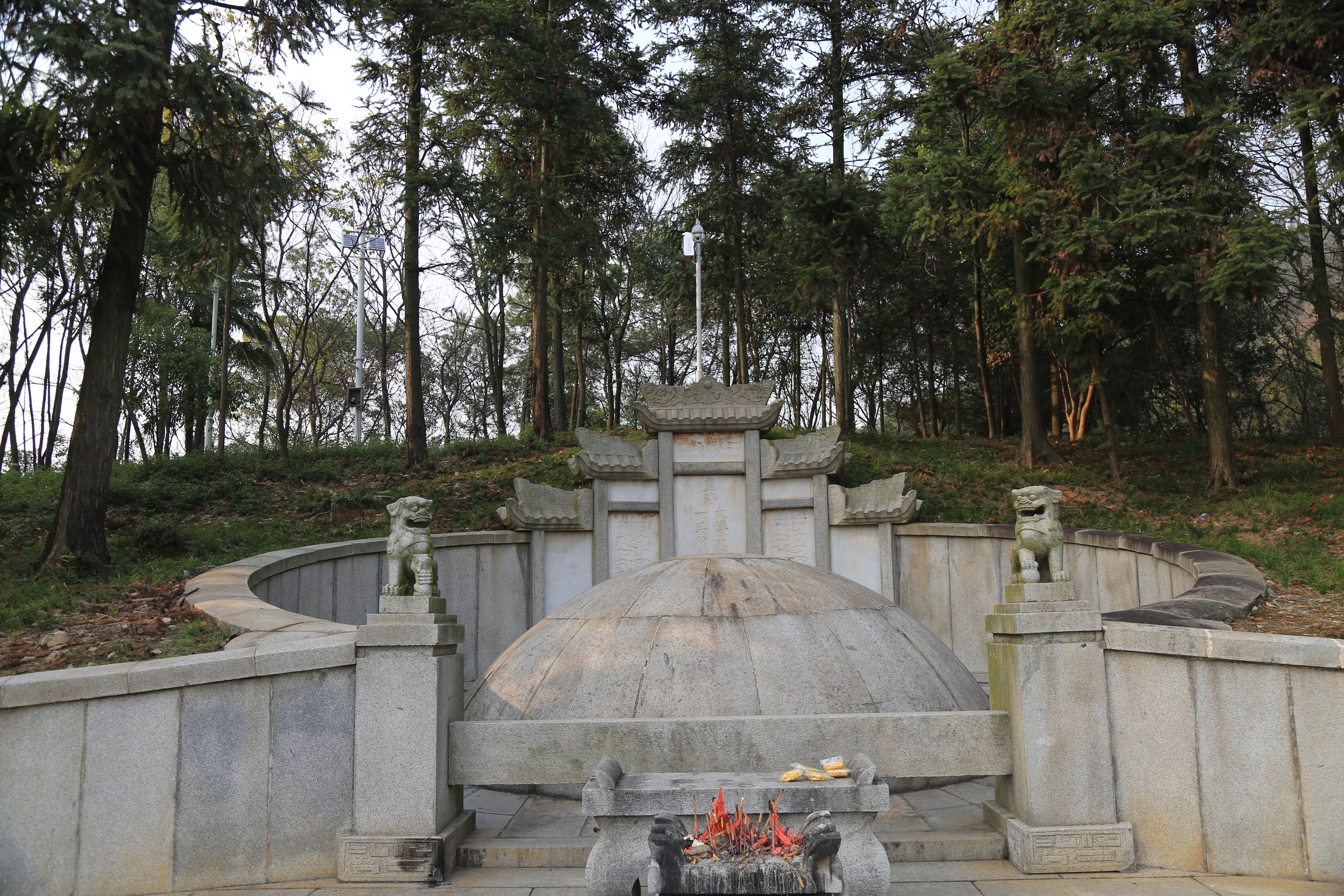
- Tomb of Zeng Guofan

- Location within Hunan

General information
- Type: Tomb
- Location: Pingtang Subdistrict, Yuelu District, Changsha, Hunan, China
- Coordinates: 28°05′05″N 112°54′28″E
- Construction started: 1873
- Renovated: 2002
- Affiliation: Hunan government

Height
- Architectural: Chinese architecture

Technical details
- Material: Granite
- Floor area: 3,000 m^{2} (32,000 sq ft)

The Tomb of Zeng Guofan (simplified Chinese: 曾国藩墓; traditional Chinese: 曾國藩墓; pinyin: Zēng Guófān Mù) is the tomb of Zeng Guofan, a Chinese statesman and military leader of the late Qing dynasty. The tomb dates from 1873, and is located in Pingtang Subdistrict, Yuelu District of Changsha, Hunan, China. In 2013 it has been the focus of the State Council of China as a National Historical and Cultural Site.

== History ==
Zeng Guofan, a statesman and military leader of the late Qing dynasty, died in 1872 and was buried in Pingtang Subdistrict, Yuelu District, Changsha, Hunan in the following year.

During the Cultural Revolution, the Red Guards attacked and smashed the tomb. Some ornaments were stolen in the 1980s. It has been designated as a municipal cultural relic preservation organ in 1993 and a provincial cultural relic preservation organ in 1996, respectively. It was renovated by local government in 2002. In 2013, it was listed among the "Major National Historical and Cultural Sites in Hunan" by the State Council of China.

== Gallery ==
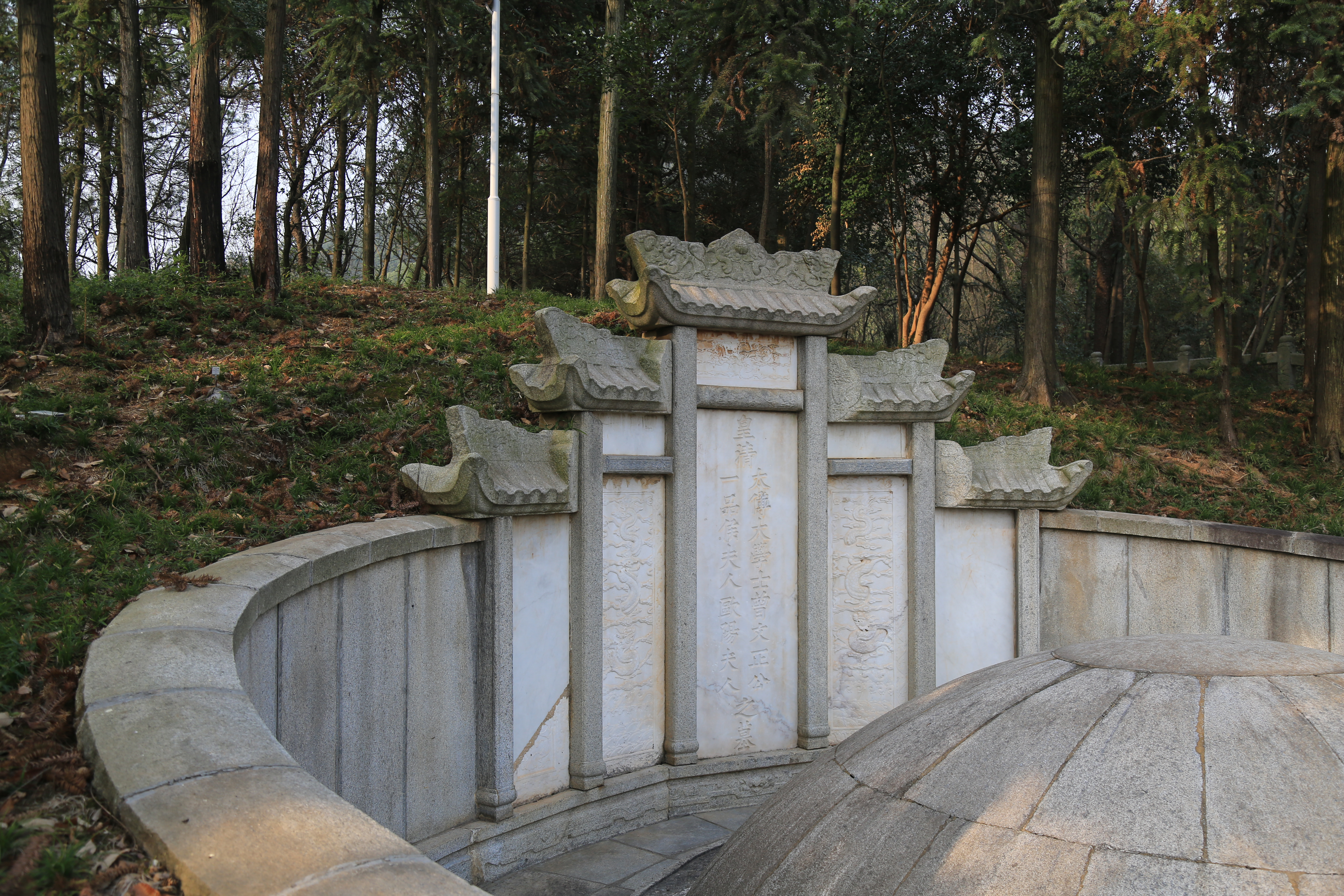
Tomb of Zeng Guofan

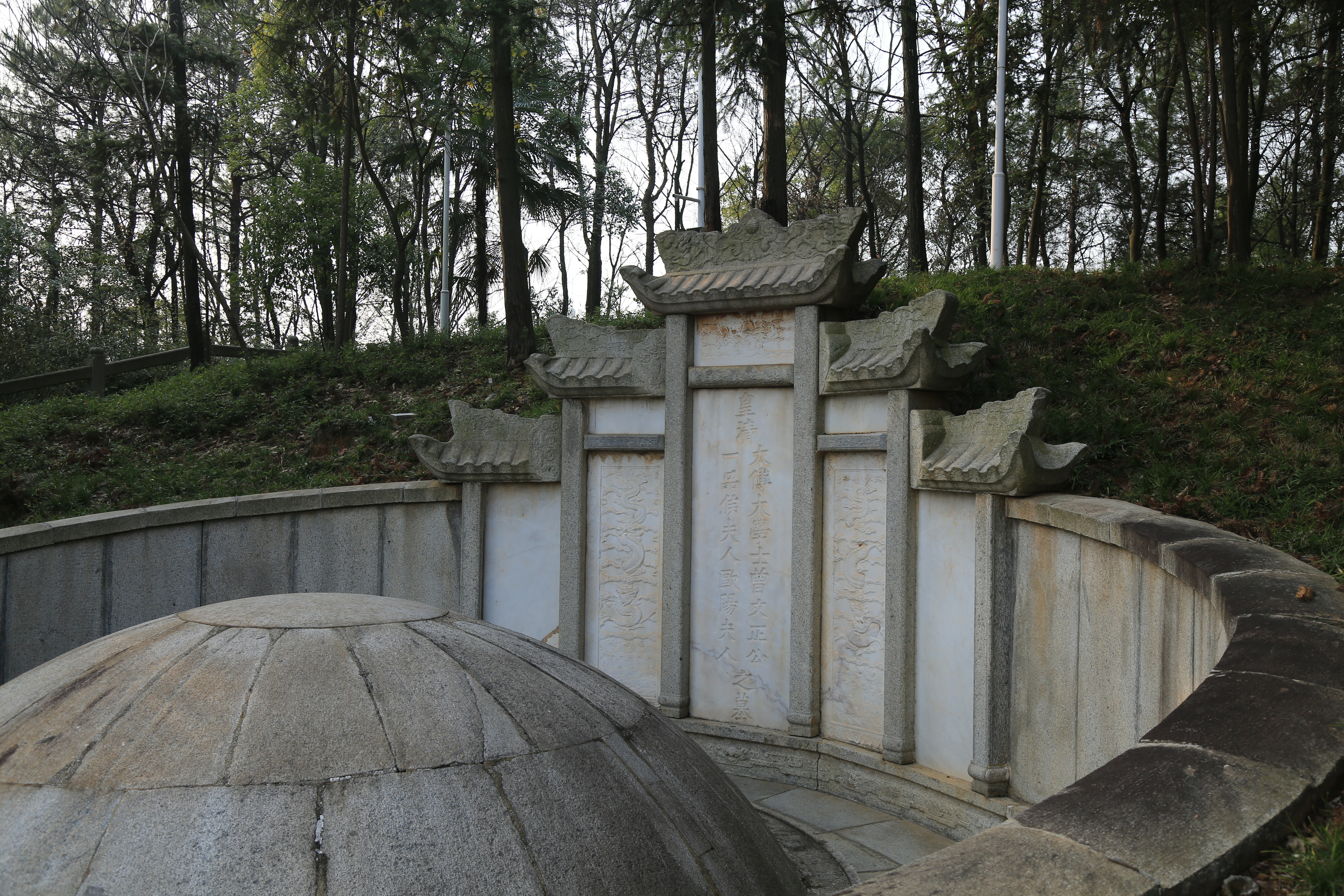
Tomb of Zeng Guofan

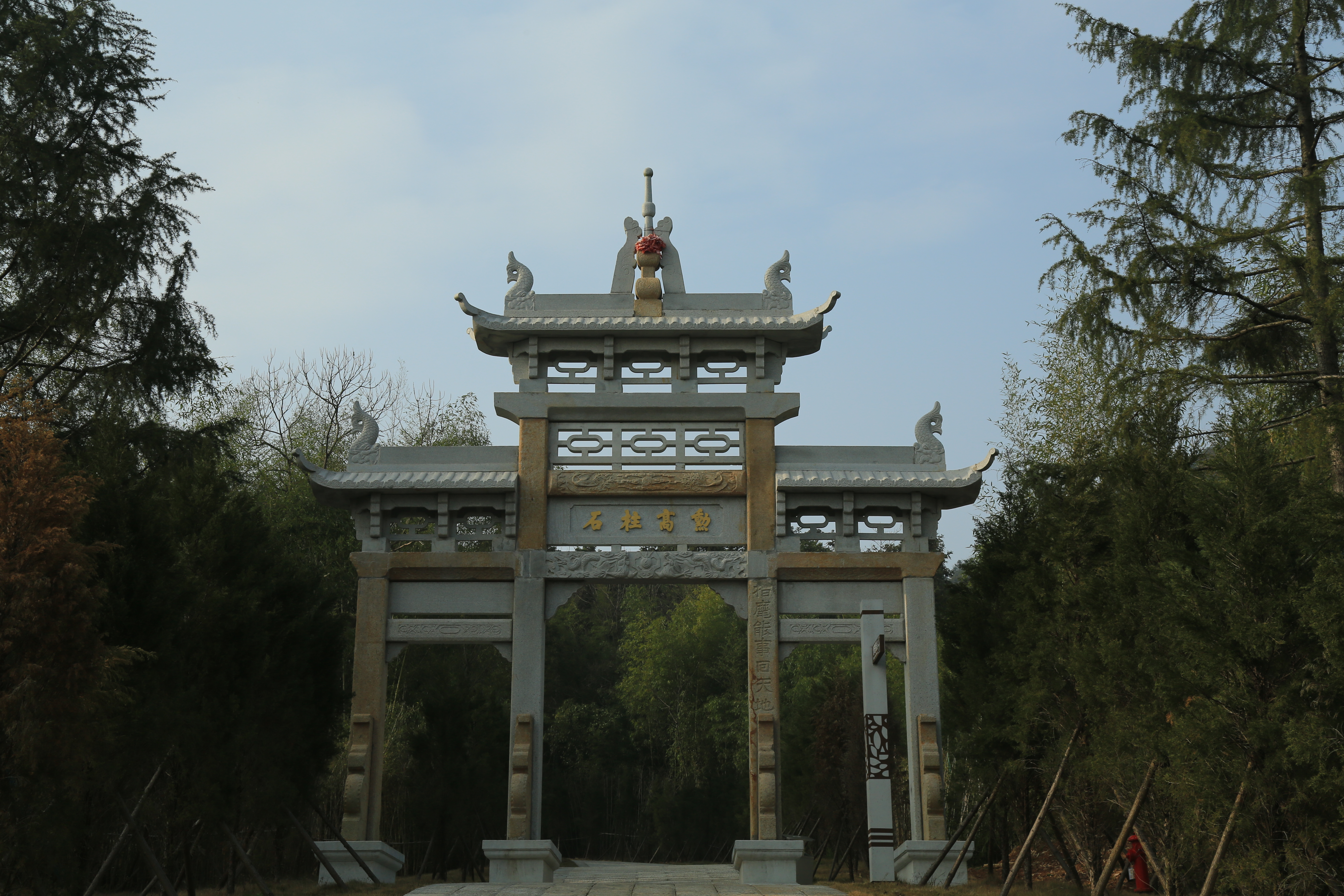
Paifang in front of the Tomb of Zeng Guofan
