= Gūbadai =

Gūbadai (Manchu: ᡤ᠋ᡡᠪᠠᡩ᠋ᠠᡳ, romanized: Gūbadai; d. 1708) was a Qing official of the Irgen Gioro clan of the Manchu Bordered Yellow Banner. Courtesy name Wenqi (文起), he served as the Minister of Rites and was one of the tutors of the future Yongzheng Emperor when the latter was still a prince.

== Biography ==
Gūbadai's grandfather, Nungdari of Sunggari Ula, joined to Nurhaci's tribe during the early expansion of the Jianzhou Jurchen. For helping to break an enemy siege, he was commended and granted name "Gūkiyoo" by Nurhaci. His father, Gunacan, distinguished himself in campaigns against the Ming dynasty and received the hereditary rank of adaha hafan. Although Gūbadai was the second son, he inherited the noble title after the deaths of his elder brother and nephew. In 1675, he placed the first in an examination for Eight Banner officials personally supervised by the Kangxi Emperor, earning promotion to Academician of the Hanlin Academy.

In 1677, he was assigned to the army led by General Manggitu, and took part in suppressing the Revolt of the Three Feudatories. In Guangxi, he repeatedly defeated the forces of Wu Shicong, contributing significantly to the Qing's regaining of the region. During the Battle of Panjiang, when Manggitu fell ill, Gūbadai assumed command of the army. Encountering Wu Shicong's forces, he decisively defeated them, and Wu Shizong was killed following the defeat. At the Battle of Nanning, facing a defending force reportedly numbering 100,000 men, Gūbadai personally charged into the enemy lines, inspiring other Qing commanders and troops who had hesitated before the engagement. The Qing army's morale increased due to his action, and the defenders were ultimately defeated. In 1680, after Manggitu died in camp, Gūbadai was reassigned to the Grand General Laita's headquarter, in the campaign against Yunnan. In 1681, when General Zhao Liangdong arrived in Yunnan, Zhao adopted Gūbadai's proposal to first seize Yinding Mountain. Using the strategic advantage of the high ground, Qing armies subsequently attacked and occupied the Yunnan capital.

After returning in triumph, Gūbadai successively served as Imperial Lecturer, Deputy Minister of Rites, and Minister of Rites. In 1693, the Kangxi Emperor evaluated him as unsuitable for his office and removed him from his office, though he was allowed to retain his hereditary title and continue serving in the imperial cabinets. He retired in 1698 and died of illness in 1708. The future Yongzheng Emperor, then still a prince, personally leading his funeral arrangements.

Because of their former teacher-student relationship, the Yongzheng Emperor restored Gūbadai's official honors after ascending the throne. He posthumously awarded him the title of Taifu (太傅, Grand Tutor), granted him the posthumous name Wenduan (文端, "Cultured and Upright"), and ordered that he be enshrined in the Temple of Worthies (賢良祠). During the reign of the Qianlong Emperor, he was further posthumously elevated to the rank of Taishi (太師, Grand Preceptor). His son, Guyan (顧儼), inherited the hereditary rank and eventually advanced to the position of Vice Commander (Fudutong). His grandson, Gucong (顧琮), served as Viceroy of Eastern Rivers during the Qianlong reign.
