= Qing Yan Garden =

Coordinates: 33°35′10.9″N 119°1′9.5″E

Qing Yan Garden (Chinese: 清晏园; pinyin: Qīng Yàn Yuán) is located in Huai'an City, Jiangsu Province, China. It is the most representative classical garden in the northern district of the Jiangsu Province. It blends the "generosity of the North" and the "exquisiteness of the South". During the Qing dynasty, the grounds of the Garden were on the office of the Viceroy of Southern Rivers.

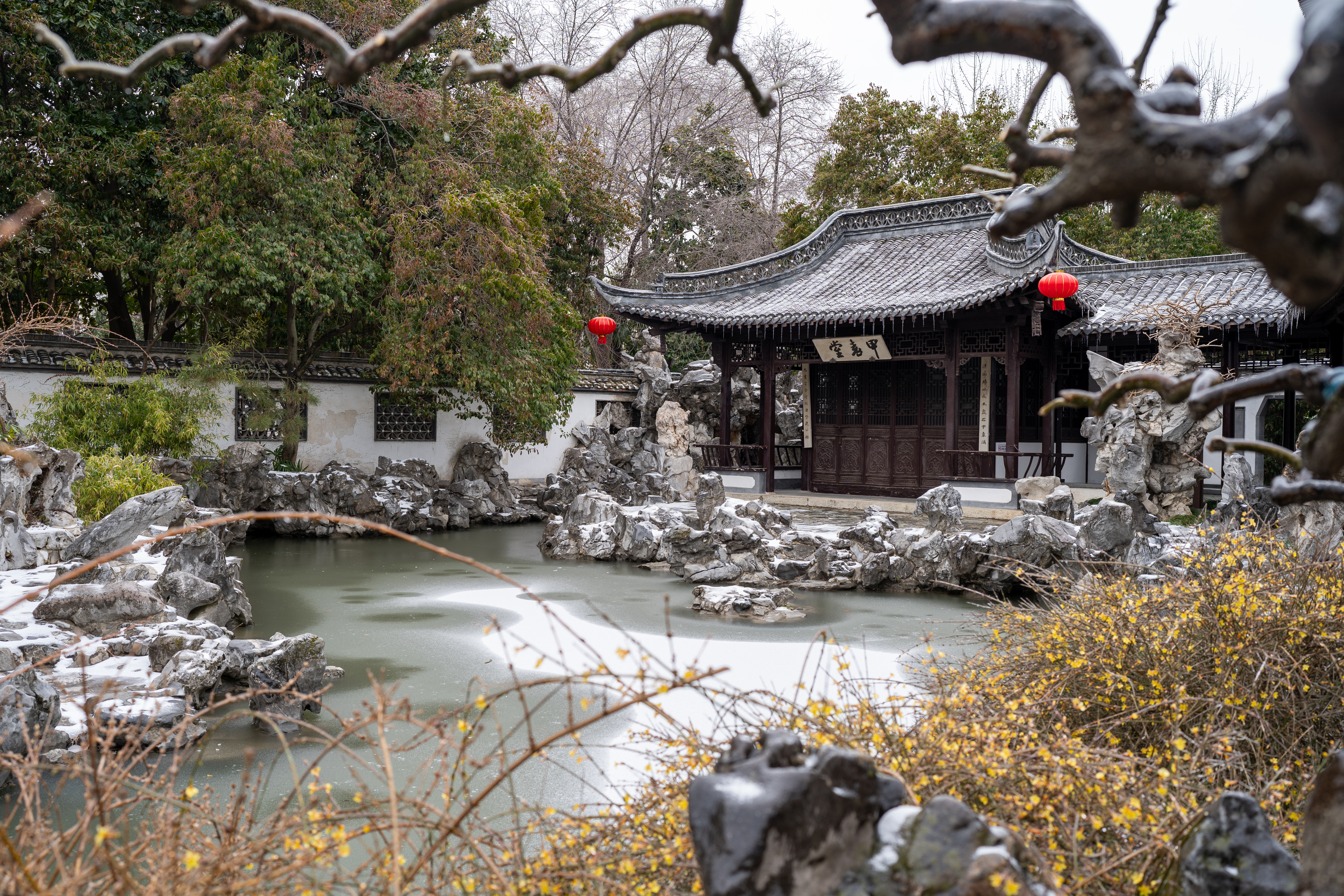
Qingyan Garden after Frozen Rain

== History ==
Qing Yan Garden was first built in seventeenth year of the reign of the Kangxi Emperor (1678) in the Qing dynasty. It has a history of more than 300 years, and is the only well-preserved classical garden in Huai'an City. According to the County Annals of Huai River, Qing Yan Garden, was once called Huai Garden, Zhan Garden, Liu Garden and Southern Garden of the City. In 1994, on the National Day, it resumed its old name—Qing Yan Garden. In the garden pavilions are in picturesque disorder, and meanwhile, meanderings, long porches and running water move in circles.

== Structure ==
Qing Yan Garden consists of five parts. The first part contains some archaized constructions, such as Huai Xiang Pavilion (淮香堂), Jiao Yin Pavilion (蕉吟馆) and Lai Jinyu Pavilion (来今雨轩). It also includes a Rose Garden. The second structure is Emperor Guan Temple (关帝庙) located in the northwest. In the southwest is the Ye Garden (叶园). The He Fang Academy (荷芳书院) is north of the lotus pond and includes a valuable library. The last one has some tourists attractions like rockery and a curved bridge.

== See also ==
- List of Chinese gardens
