= Sun Jiagan =

Chinese politician

Assistant Grand Secretary
- In office 29 October 1752 – 30 December 1753

Minister of Personnel
- In office 29 October 1752 – 30 December 1753
- Preceded by: Liang Shizheng
- Succeeded by: Huang Tinggui
- In office 25 May 1738 – 29 November 1738
- Preceded by: Liu Yuyi
- Succeeded by: Gan Rulai

Minister of Works
- In office 21 August 1750 – 29 October 1752
- Preceded by: Liu Tongxun
- Succeeded by: Wang Youdun

Governor of Fujian
- In office 5 March 1743 – 17 May 1743
- Preceded by: Liu Yuyi
- Succeeded by: Zhou Xuejian

Viceroy of Huguang
- In office 26 September 1741 – 27 January 1743
- Preceded by: Nasutu
- Succeeded by: Arsai

Minister of Justice
- In office 6 December 1736 – 25 May 1738
- Preceded by: Xu Ben
- Succeeded by: Zhao Guolin

Viceroy of Zhili
- In office 29 November 1738 – 26 September 1741
- Preceded by: Li Wei
- Succeeded by: Gao Bin

Personal details
- Born: 14 March 1683
- Died: 29 December 1753 (aged 70)
- Education: Jinshi degree in the Imperial Examination (1713)
- Courtesy name: Xigong (錫公)
- Art name: Yizhai (懿齋), Jingxuan (靜軒)
- Posthumous name: Wending (文定)

Sun Jiagan (Chinese: 孫嘉淦; Hanyu Pinyin: Sūn Jiāgàn; Tongyong Pinyin: Sun Chia-kan, 14 March 1683 – 29 December 1753) was a Chinese politician of the Qing dynasty.

Born in Taiyuan, Shanxi, Sun was son of a family that was so poor that he had to work hard all day collecting firewood, and could only study at night.

In 1713, he graduated as a jinshi in the imperial examination during the reign of the Kangxi Emperor and rose to the position of Libu Shilang (Note: Li Bu (in Chinese), a ministry (Bu) for selecting civil servants (Li) in feudal China; Shi Lang (in Chinese) is an equivalent of Vice Minister.) for his frankness and uprightness.

During the reign of the Qianlong Emperor, Sun rose to the position of Xingbu Shangshu (Note: Xingbu Shangshu (in Chinese), equivalent to today's Justice Minister.) by 1730, and later to Libu Shangshu in 1738. He was degraded for disrespect in taking up the Qianlong Emperor's pencil to write with. However, the emperor restored him to office.

After holding various posts, in 1741 Sun became Viceroy of Huguang, where he introduced the system of subsidized chiefs, in order to keep the aborigines under control.

In 1743, he was relieved from his position due to shielding his men, yet was recalled to be head of the Imperial Clan Court in 1744.In 1745 he retired, but resumed office and served as Gongbu Shangshu (Note: An equivalent of Interior Minister.) in 1750.
