= Hu Linyi =

Chinese scholar and official (1812 – 1861)

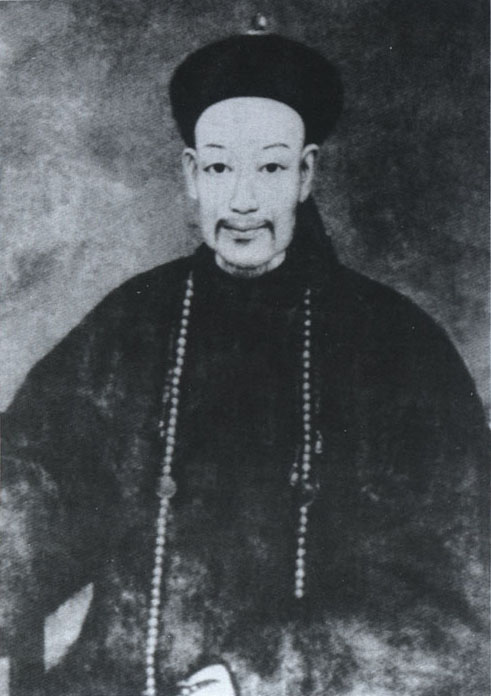
Hu Linyi

Hu Linyi (Chinese: 胡林翼; Wade–Giles: Hu^{2} Lin^{3}-i^{1}; July 14, 1812 – Sept 30, 1861) was a scholar and official during the late Qing Dynasty in China. He rose to prominence after being awarded the jinshi degree in the Imperial Civil Service Examinations in 1836, and in 1838 became a compiler of the Hanlin Academy in Beijing. After serving in several prefectural appointments in Guizhou, Hu was appointed the Governor of Hubei province in 1855. In that capacity, he merged multiple local militia groups to form a resistance force, the Hubei Army, to combat the Taiping Rebellion. He coordinated military efforts alongside other provincial leaders, such as Zeng Guofan and Zuo Zongtang. By 1857, Hu's Hubei Army was successful in recapturing Wuchang and much of Hubei from the Taiping. Deeply overworked by the campaign against the Taiping, however, Hu died in 1861 before the war's conclusion.

During his tenure as Governor of Hubei, Hu managed to significantly reduce the land tax by improving the method of collection, providing a model for other provinces during the Tongzhi Restoration era. His ideas were adopted by other provincial leaders, such as Shen Baozhen in Jiangxi.
