= Gucong =

Gucong (顧琮, Manchu: ᡤᡠᡯᡠᠩ, romanized: Gudzung or Guzung; 1685–1755) was a Qing official from the Irgen Gioro clan of the Manchu Bordered Yellow Banner. He served as Viceroy of Rivers and Grain Transport in Qianlong era. He was the grandson of Grand Preceptor Gūbadai, and the son of Guyan (顧儼), who reached to the position of deputy Banner army commander (副都統).

== Biography ==
As a young man, Gucong entered the Academy of Mathematics as a Jiansheng (監生, Imperial Academy student) and participated in the compilation of works on mathematics, including the Methods of Calculation (算法). He later served as Assistant Director in the Ministry of Personnel, Director in the Ministry of Revenue, and several other duties as imperial commissioner. In 1733, he was promoted to Minister of the Court of Imperial Sacrifices and served as Acting Viceroy of Zhili. Shortly thereafter, he was appointed Viceroy of Zhili Rivers (直隶河道総督).

In 1736, he served as acting Governor of Jiangsu, but returned home to observe mourning rites following the death of his father. The following year, he was appointed Acting Deputy Minister of Personnel. When the Yongding River flooded, he supervised hydraulic engineering works together with Li Wei. Soon afterward, he became Acting Viceroy of River (河道総督). In 1740, Gucong dredged two diversion channels near Beijing, and submitted memorials outlining plans for their future management. He was subsequently transferred to the post of Viceroy of Grain Transport (漕運総督). In 1743, while reporting on official affairs in Beijing, he requested permission from the Qianlong Emperor to restrict the diversion of water for agricultural irrigation. The emperor rejected the proposal, criticizing it as a measure that would unnecessarily disturb the populace.

In 1746, Gucong served as acting Viceroy of Southern Rivers (江南河道總督). The following year, together with Grand Secretary Gao Bin, he investigated allegations of corruption against Chang'an, the Governor of Zhejiang. Because he failed to pursue the investigation thoroughly, he was dismissed from office, although he was allowed to remain in service. Soon afterward, he was reassigned as Viceroy of Eastern Rivers (河東河道總督). In 1754, he was again dismissed after being accused of wasting public funds on hydraulic engineering projects during his tenure as acting Viceroy of Southern Rivers. He died of illness not long afterward.
