= Sun Yuting =

Governor-general of Jiangxi, Jiangsu and Anhui

Grand Secretary of the Tiren Library
- In office 1824–1825

Assistant Grand Secretary
- In office 1821–1824

Viceroy of Liangjiang
- In office 25 December 1816 – 9 September 1824
- Preceded by: Bailing
- Succeeded by: Wei Yuan

Viceroy of Huguang
- In office 1816–1816
- Preceded by: Ma Huiyu
- Succeeded by: Ruan Yuan

Governor of Yunnan
- In office 1810–1815
- Preceded by: Tongxing
- Succeeded by: Chen Ruolin

Governor of Guangdong
- In office 4 July 1805 – 29 November 1808
- Preceded by: Bailing
- Succeeded by: Yongbao
- In office 29 October 1803 – 30 December 1804
- Preceded by: Zu Zhiwang
- Succeeded by: Bailing

Governor of Guangxi
- In office 1804–1805
- Preceded by: Bailing
- Succeeded by: Wang Rizhang
- In office 1802–1803
- Preceded by: Xie Qikun
- Succeeded by: Bailing

Personal details
- Born: 1752 Jining, Shandong, China
- Died: 1834 (aged 81–82) Jining, Shandong, China

Sun Yuting
- Traditional Chinese: 孫玉庭
- Simplified Chinese: 孙玉庭
Transcriptions
Standard Mandarin
- Hanyu Pinyin: Sūn Yùtíng
- Wade–Giles: Sun Yü-t'ing

Jiashu (courtesy name)
- Traditional Chinese: 嘉樹
- Simplified Chinese: 嘉树
Transcriptions
Standard Mandarin
- Hanyu Pinyin: Jiāshù

Jipu (pseudonym)
- Traditional Chinese: 寄圃
- Simplified Chinese: 寄圃
Transcriptions
Standard Mandarin
- Hanyu Pinyin: Jìpǔ

Sun Yuting (Mandarin Chinese: 孫玉庭, Wade-Giles: Sun Yu-t'ing, Pinyin: Sun Yuting; 1752–1834), courtesy name Jiashu and Art name Jipu, was a Chinese official of the Qing dynasty. He served as the Provincial Governor of Jiangnan province (which consisted of modern-day Jiangxi, Jiangsu, and Anhui provinces), alongside Guangdong, Yunnan, and Guangxi provinces. He also served as Viceroy of Huguang and Liangjiang, and as a member of the Grand Council. He lived during the reigns of the Qianlong, Jiaqing, and Daoguang emperors, and was closely associated with the Jiaqing Emperor in 1816.

== Early life ==
Sun Yuting was from Jining, Shandong Province. He sat for the palace-level imperial examination in 1775 and obtained the position of a tong jinshi chushen (third class graduate). He was admitted to the Hanlin Academy, where he served as a shujishi (庶吉士). In August 1802, he was promoted from buzhengshi (布政使; Lieutenant-Governor) of Hubei Province to Provincial Governor of Guangxi Province. On 29 October 1803, he was reassigned to serve as the Provincial Governor of Guangdong Province. Around December 1804, he was transferred back to Guangxi, but was relocated back to Guangdong on 4 July 1805 until 1808.

== Career ==
In 1810, Sun Yuting was appointed as the Provincial Governor of Yunnan Province before he was later promoted to Viceroy of Huguang and then Viceroy of Liangjiang. In March 1821, while serving as Viceroy of Liangjiang, he was also given the honorary title of Assisting Grand Secretary (協辦大學士). In August 1824, he was promoted to Grand Secretary of Tiren Cabinet (體仁閣大學士). However, he was subsequently dismissed from office in 1824 due to a breach in the Yellow River embankment, which was under his supervision. However, this was considered to be a result of the Grand Canal crisis, driven by a major breakdown of the imperial grain transport system, which was undergoing management by Qishan and the Daoguang Emperor.

In July 1825, Sun Yuting was restored to the civil service as a bianxiu (編修; compiler and editor) in the Hanlin Academy under the xiuzhi (休致) system for retired officials. In 1834, he was awarded the privilege of wearing the hat of a fourth-grade official. He died in the same year at the age of 82.

=== Foreign Affairs ===
During his tenure as Provincial Governor of Guangdong, Sun Yuting put down the Shantou clan fights and tried to eliminate the practice of bribing pirates into submitting to the government. In 1802, as Provincial Governor of Guangxi, he urged the Qing imperial court to recognise Fu Yang (aka Gia Long), the de facto king of Annam, and allow Annam to be again called Nanyue. In 1816, when Lord Amherst visited the Jiaqing Emperor's court as England's ambassador extraordinary to China, Sun Yuting advised the Jiaqing Emperor to exempt Amherst from the customary prostrations and kowtowing for foreign ambassadors to the Emperor. At the same time, he assured the Jiaqing Emperor that the English could not live without tea, and that to prohibit tea exports from China would soon bring England to its knees.

== Family ==
Sun Yuting's family was an elite family of scholar-bureaucrats who served in high-ranking positions in the Qing government for over three generations. Since 1804, they had also been running a family business, Yutang Jiangyuan (玉堂醬園), which is now known as the Jining Yutang Sauce and Pickles Shop Co., Ltd..

Sun Yuting's father, Sun Kuotu (孫擴圖), obtained a juren position in the imperial examination in 1735. He served as the Magistrate (知縣) of Qiantang County (錢塘縣; now part of Hangzhou) and was a friend of the painter Zheng Xie.

Sun Yuting's eldest son, Sun Shanbao (孫善寶; 1772–1853), obtained a juren position in the imperial examination and served as a Vice Secretary of Justice and Provincial Governor of Jiangsu Province.

Sun Yuting's second son was Sun Renrong (孫仁榮). Sun Renrong's son, Sun Yuyan (孫毓溎; 1802–1867), emerged as the top candidate in the imperial examination in 1844 and served as the anchashi (按察使; Provincial Judicial Commissioner) of Zhejiang Province.

Sun Yuting's third son, Sun Ruizhen (孫瑞珍; 1783–1858), obtained a jinshi position in the imperial examination in 1823 and served in the Hanlin Academy and as Secretary of Revenue. Sun Ruizhen's son, Sun Yuwen (孫毓汶; 1833–1899), obtained the second highest position in the imperial examination in 1856 and served as Secretary of Defence and head of the Zongli Yamen (Foreign Affairs Ministry). One of Sun Ruizhen's grandsons, Sun Ji (孫楫; 1827–1902), obtained a jinshi position in the imperial examination in 1852 and served as the Prefect of Shuntian Prefecture.
