= Liu Tongxun =

Chief Grand Councillor
- In office 4 June 1771 – 29 December 1773
- Preceded by: Yengišan
- Succeeded by: Yu Minzhong

Grand Councillor
- In office 18 April 1752 – 29 December 1773

Grand Secretary of the Eastern Library
- In office 10 May 1761 – 29 December 1773

Assistant Grand Secretary
- In office 24 January 1759 – 10 May 1761

Minister of Personnel
- In office 24 January 1758 – 10 May 1761
- Preceded by: Wang Youdun
- Succeeded by: Liang Shizheng

Minister of Justice
- In office 18 February 1756 – 24 January 1758
- Preceded by: Wang Youdun
- Succeeded by: Qin Huitian
- In office 21 August 1750 – 21 November 1755
- Preceded by: Wang Youdun
- Succeeded by: Wang Youdun

Minister of Works
- In office 13 January 1750 – 21 August 1750
- Preceded by: Zhao Hong'en
- Succeeded by: Sun Jiagan

Personal details
- Born: 11 February 1700 Zhucheng, Shandong, China
- Died: 29 December 1773 (aged 73) Beijing, China
- Children: Liu Yong (son)

Liu Tongxun (simplified Chinese: 刘统勋; traditional Chinese: 劉統勳; 11 February 1700 – 29 December 1773) was a politician in the Qing dynasty. He was one of relatively few ethnically Han Grand Secretariat of the Qianlong Emperor's reign. He has served for the Qing government for more than 40 years with integrity, and dares to direct advise the emperor, has made remarkable achievements in official administration, military affairs and river conservancy.

== Life ==
Liu Tongxun was born in a scholarly family and got a good education since childhood. His father Liu Jie received Jinshi degree in Kangxi Emperor’s period, served as provincial administrator, then later promoted to lieutenant governor in Sichuan. And his grandfather Liu Bixian also gained Jinshi degree in Shunzhi Emperor's period. Liu Tongxun was studying hard enough, and obtain Jinshi degree in 1724. Sooner, he started his career in Hanlin Academy (Chinese: 翰林院). Later on, he risen through the central administration. He died in 1773 due to overwork, at the age of 76.

== Achievements ==
=== Investigating malfeasance ===
Liu Tongxun was famous in the central government because of his incorruptible personality. He investigated several cases of Manchu officials who got involved in malfeasance.

In 1741, he indicted Grand Councilor Zhang Tingyu, Grand Secretary Noqin of in order to curb nepotism factionalism.

In 1753, he was sent to Lower Yangzi valley (Yangtze valley) to investigate river conservancy. During this investigation, he found two officials Gao Bin and Zhang Shizai who in charge of river conservancy in Yangzi, mismanaged the river conservancy and confused the financial accounts. Gao and Zhang lost their positions after verified misconducts.

In 1759, he was called on to investigated a former governor in Shanxi province, Jiang Zhou. Jiang was found guilty because he had not accounted for deficits in the provincial treasury when he was in the position.

In 1760, he convicted the Chinese education commissioner of Jiangxi province, Asiha of corruption and accepting bribes from his subordinate and local gentry members.

=== River conservancy ===
Although the Qing court took various measures to strengthen regulation in river conservancy and spent a large amount of money, they gained little success. In 1736, the emperor promoted Liu Tongxun to Grand Secretariat, and followed the other Grand Secretary Ji Zengyun to Zhejiang province to study river conservancy.

In 1746, Liu Tongxun served as governor of the transport of water. In 1748, Liu Tongxun and his colleague Gaobin inspected the relief work in Shandong Province and investigated the river courses. At that time, the canal rose quickly and Liu Tongxun asked for permission to divert the canal water out of the sea. After the fall, the height of the two embankments will be raised again, blocking the water and preventing dam breaches and floods.

=== Quell Zunghar Mongols ===
Between 1757 and 1759, the Qianlong Emperor invaded the territory around the Tarim Basin for the expansion of its territory. Liu Tongxun did not consider it necessary to conquer this huge ranch that had not traditionally threatened China's homeland. He suggested that the main force should be temporarily withdrawn to Hami to avoid any further losses. However, the Qianlong Emperor was mad and would not accept this admonition. This time, Liu Tongxun was put in jail for a long time. Later, the Qianlong Emperor ordered the release of him and his family, and returned his property.

== Other works ==
"Xiyu Tuzhi"(Chinese: "西域图志"), 1756.

"Imperial Collection of Four" ("Siku Quanshu"/ Chinese: "四库全书"), 1773.
