= Fang Guancheng =

Fang Guancheng (simplified Chinese: 方观承; traditional Chinese: 方觀承; pinyin: Fāng Guānchéng) (1696 or 1698– 27 September 1768), also known by his Art name Yi Tian (宜田), was a Chinese Noble and government official of the Qing dynasty, notable for being the Viceroy of Zhili.

== Early life and family origins ==
Fang Guancheng was born in Tongcheng County, Anhui Province in the Qing Empire. The Fang family of Tongcheng was notable for its many scholars and authors. He was the second son of Fang Shiji, an official of the Ministry of the Principal (官至工部主事). His elder brother was Fang Guanyong (方观永). His paternal grandfather was Fang Dengfeng (方登峄) and his paternal great-grandfather was Fang Xiaobiao (方孝标).

== Nanshan Case ==
The Nanshan Case occurred in 1713, the fifth year of the Kangxi Emperor. The incident marked a period of literary inquisition that targeted various scholars with real or perceived loyalties to competing claimants to the throne and to the previous Ming dynasty. Both Fang's father and grandfather were caught up in the action resulting in the exile of both to Heilongjiang. Due to their young age, Fang and his brother were not subjected to the same exile and were instead sent to be raised by monks from the Qingliang Temple.

Following the exile of their paternal support structure, the brothers were forced to travel great distances overland from the capital at Nanjing to Heilongjiang beyond the Great Wall for family gatherings.

== Political career ==
In 1749, Fang Guancheng was made the Viceroy of Zhili, a position he would hold until his demise. In addition to this title, he was also granted the title of Governor of Shaanxi and Gansu Provinces, a title he held until 1755.

== Descendants and legacy ==
Fang Guancheng had one son, Fang Weidian who became the Governor of Fukien and the Governor of Zhejiang. Fang's nephew, Fang Shouchou, the son of Fang's brother Fang Guanyong served as Viceroy of Zhili. His grandson Fang Chuanmu continued to become a Qing prefect.
