= Viceroy of Zhili =

Qing dynasty viceroy

- Chinese: 直隸總督
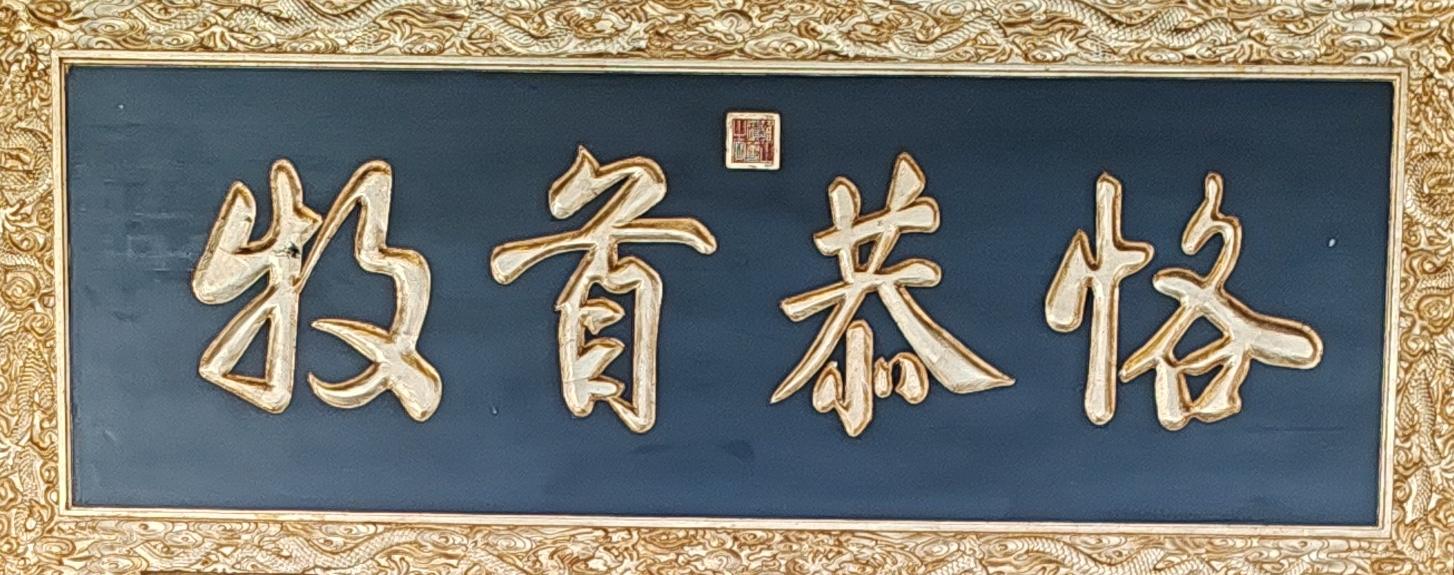
- Banner of the Governor, saying "the most Pious and Primus Pastor", given by Yongzheng Emperor in 1733

- Government Flag

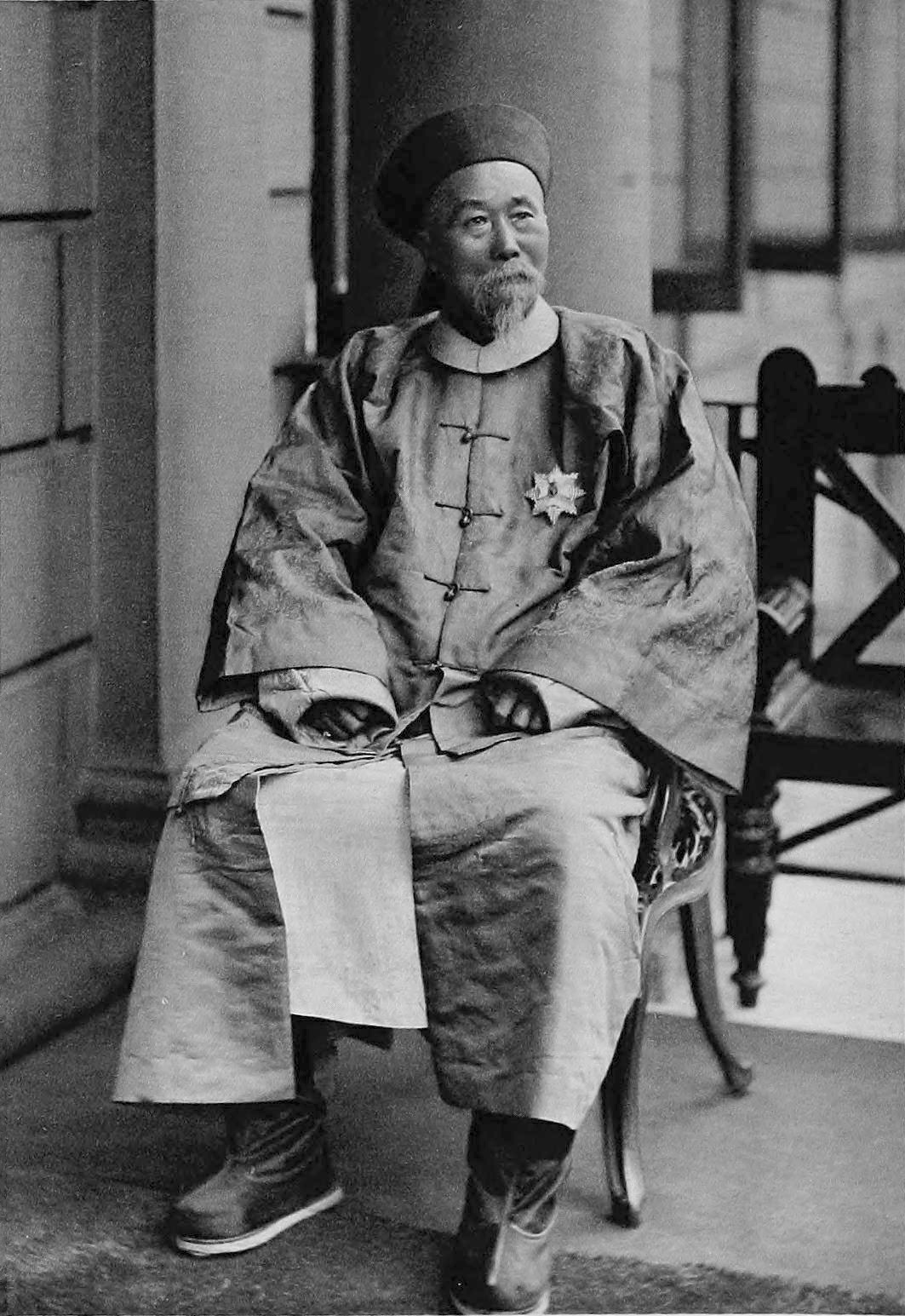
- Li Hongzhang, who served as the Viceroy of Zhili for 25 years and played a vital role in China's modernization
- Style: Governor
- Status: Head of state; Head of government
- Residence: Office of Viceroy of Zhili (in present-day Lianchi, Baoding, Hebei)
- Term length: undefinitive
- Precursor: Ming Dynasty: Beizhili Province (Directly Subordinate Province in North, governed directly from Beijing); Early Qing Dynasty (1648-1658): Viceroy of Tri-Province of Zhili, Henan and Shandong
- Formation: 1658-1911
- First holder: Zhang Cunren
- Final holder: Zhang Zhenfang

Viceroy of Zhili

Chinese name
- Traditional Chinese: 直隸總督
- Simplified Chinese: 直隶总督
Transcriptions
Standard Mandarin
- Hanyu Pinyin: Zhílì Zǒngdū
- Wade–Giles: Chih^{2}-li^{4} Tsung^{3}-tu^{1}

Governor-General of the Directly Subordinate Province and Other Local Areas, in Charge of Military Affairs, Food and Salary, Management of Rivers and Governor Affairs (full title)
- Traditional Chinese: 總督直隸等處地方，提督軍務、糧餉、管理河道兼巡撫事
- Simplified Chinese: 总督直隶等处地方，提督军务、粮饷、管理河道兼巡抚事
Transcriptions

Manchu name
- Manchu script: ᡷᡳᠯᡳ ᡠᡥᡝᡵᡳ ᡴᠠᡩᠠᠯᠠᡵᠠ ᠠᠮᠪᠠᠨ
- Romanization: jyli uheri kadalara amban

The Viceroy of Zhili, officially in Chinese as the Governor-General of the Directly Subordinate Province and Other Local Areas, in Charge of Military Affairs, Food and Wages, Management of Rivers and Governor Affairs, was one of eight regional Viceroys during the Qing dynasty. The Viceroy of Zhili had jurisdiction of military, civil, and political affairs over then Zhili Province (nowadays approx. Hebei, Beijing suburban, Tianjin). The Governor's Office sat in then Zhili Province's Baoding Prefecture City (nowadays Baoding City's Lianchi District).

The Viceroy of Zhili was an important post because the province of Zhili, which literally means "directly ruled," was the area surrounding the imperial capital, Beijing. The administrative centre was in Tianjin even though the provincial capital was in Baoding. The Viceroy's duties as well as responsibilities have never been defined entirely. Generally speaking, the Viceroy oversaw the military and civil affairs of Zhili, Shandong and Henan provinces. The Viceroy of Zhili was also highly influential in imperial court politics. The position was set up in 1648 and abolished in 1912.

== History ==
Jurisdiction of the Viceroy of Zhili in 1911

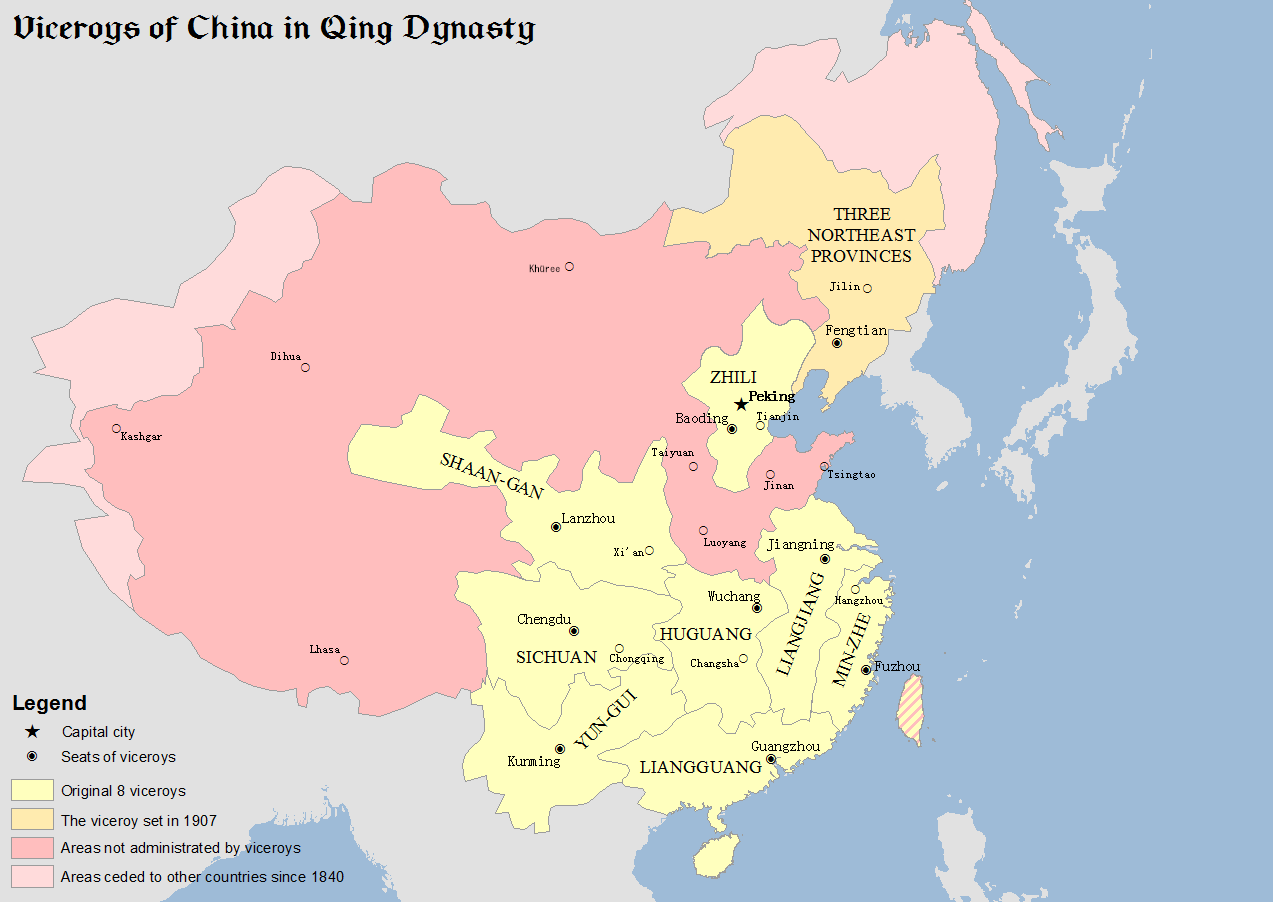
Map of viceroys in Qing Dynasty of China

The office was first created on 30 September 1649 during the reign of the Shunzhi Emperor, but was later abolished on 1 June 1658. On 23 November 1661, during the reign of the Kangxi Emperor, the office was recreated, however abolished again later on 28 July 1669. After the Yongzheng Emperor restored it on 14 December 1724, the office had remained in place until the fall of the Qing dynasty in 1912.

From 1870 onwards, the Viceroy of Zhili concurrently held the position of "Beiyang Trade Minister" (北洋通商大臣); cf. "Nanyang Trade Minister" (南洋通商大臣) held by the Viceroy of Liangjiang.

47 people had held the position from 1649 to 1912. Among them, the more notable ones included Tang Zhiyu, Fang Guancheng, Zeng Guofan, Ronglu and Yuan Shikai.

== List of Viceroys of Zhili ==
| # | Name | Portrait | Start of term | End of term | Notes |
|---|---|---|---|---|---|
Viceroy of Zhili, Shandong and Henan (1649–1658)
| 1 | Zhang Cunren 張存仁 | | 30 September 1649 | November 1651 | Died in office |
| 2 | Ma Guanghui 馬光輝 | | 29 November 1651 | 8 April 1654 | Left office due to illness |
| 3 | Li Zuyin 李祖蔭 | | 16 April 1654 | 4 February 1657 | Reassigned to serve as Viceroy of Huguang |
| 4 | Zhang Xuanxi 張懸錫 | | 24 February 1657 | 1 June 1658 | Demoted and dismissed from office on 29 June 1658 |
Viceroy of Zhili (1661–1665)
| 5 | Miao Cheng 苗澄 | | 23 November 1661 | 4 July 1665 | Dismissed from office |
Viceroy of Zhili, Shandong and Henan (1665–1669)
| 6 | Zhu Changzuo 朱昌祚 | | 13 July 1665 | 8 January 1667 | Dismissed from office |
| 7 | Bai Bingzhen 白秉貞 | | 27 January 1667 | 30 September 1669 | Dismissed from office on 28 July 1669 |
Viceroy of Zhili (1724–1912)
| 8 | Li Weijun 李維鈞 | | 14 December 1724 | 26 September 1725 | Dismissed from office |
| | Cai Ting 蔡珽 | | 26 September 1725 | | Stand-in as the Secretary of Defence |
| 9 | Li Fu 李紱 | | 1 October 1725 | 16 January 1727 | Reassigned to serve as Right Vice Secretary of Works |
| | Yi Zhaoxiong 宜兆熊 | | 16 January 1727 | 23 June 1728 | Stand-in as the Viceroy of Huguang |
| | Liu Shishu 劉師恕 | | 16 January 1727 | 8 March 1729 | Stand-in as the Right Vice Secretary of Rites |
| | He Shiji 何世璂 | | 23 June 1728 | 4 March 1729 | Stand-in as the Right Vice Secretary of Personnel |
| | Yang Kun 楊鯤 | | 24 February 1729 | 1 July 1729 | Stand-in as the Governor-General of Zhili |
| | Tang Zhiyu 唐執玉 | | 1 July 1729 | 27 October 1731 | Stand-in as the Left Censor-in-Chief |
| | Liu Yuyi 劉於義 | | 27 October 1731 | 2 September 1732 | Stand-in as the Secretary of Justice |
| | Li Wei 李衛 | | 2 September 1732 | September 1732 | Acting Viceroy of Zhili |
| 10 | Li Wei 李衛 | | September 1732 | 29 November 1738 | Retired due to illness |
| | Tang Zhiyu 唐執玉 | | 19 February 1733 | April 1733 | Stand-in as the Secretary of Justice |
| | Sun Jiagan 孫嘉淦 | | 29 November 1738 | 6 December 1738 | Stand-in as the Secretary of Personnel |
| 11 | Sun Jiagan 孫嘉淦 | | 6 December 1738 | 26 September 1741 | Reassigned to serve as the Viceroy of Huguang |
| 12 | Gao Bin 高斌 | | 26 September 1741 | 19 June 1745 | Promoted to Secretary of Personnel |
| | Liu Yuyi 劉於義 | | 28 February 1745 | | Stand-in as the Secretary of Personnel |
| 13 | Nasutu 那蘇圖 | | 19 June 1745 | 18 August 1749 | Died in office |
| | Chen Dashou 陳大受 | | 1749 | | Stand-in as the Secretary of Personnel and Assisting Grand Secretary |
| 14 | Fang Guancheng 方觀承 | | 18 August 1749 | 25 September 1768 | Retired due to illness |
| | Omida 鄂彌達 | | 30 October 1755 | | Stand-in as the Secretary of Justice |
| | Yang Tingzhang 楊廷璋 | | 25 September 1768 | 27 September 1768 | Stand-in as the Secretary of Justice |
| 15 | Yang Tingzhang 楊廷璋 | | 27 September 1768 | 26 November 1771 | Reassigned to serve as the Secretary of Justice |
| 16 | Zhou Yuanli 周元理 | | 26 November 1771 | 27 April 1779 | Dismissed from office |
| | Ying Lian 英廉 | | 27 April 1779 | 29 April 1779 | Stand-in as the Secretary of Revenue |
| 17 | Yang Jingsu 楊景素 | | 29 April 1779 | 27 January 1780 | Died in office |
| 18 | Yuan Shoutong 袁守侗 | | 27 January 1780 | 13 January 1782 | Left office for filial mourning |
| | Zhou Yuanli 周元理 | | 27 January 1780 | | Acting Viceroy of Zhili |
| | Ying Lian 英廉 | | 13 January 1782 | | Stand-in as the Grand Secretary |
| 19 | Zheng Dajin 鄭大進 | | 13 January 1782 | 25 November 1782 | Died in office |
| 20 | Yuan Shoutong 袁守侗 | | 25 November 1782 | 16 June 1783 | Died in office |
| | Liu Yong 劉墉 | | 16 June 1783 | | Stand-in as the Secretary of Works |
| 21 | Liu E 劉峨 | | 16 June 1783 | 10 April 1790 | Demoted to serve as Left Vice Secretary of Defence |
| 22 | Liang Kentang 梁肯堂 | | 10 April 1790 | 20 February 1798 | Promoted to Secretary of Justice |
| 23 | Hu Jitang 胡季堂 | | 20 February 1798 | 24 November 1800 | Left office due to illness |
| | Yan Jian 顏檢 | | 24 November 1800 | | Stand-in as the Lieutenant-Governor of Zhili |
| 24 | Jiang Sheng 姜晟 | | 5 December 1800 | 19 July 1801 | Dismissed from office and arrested |
| | Xiong Mei 熊枚 | | 19 July 1801 | | Stand-in as the Left Vice Secretary of Justice |
| 25 | Chen Dawen 陳大文 | | 20 July 1801 | 3 May 1802 | Left office due to illness |
| | Xiong Mei 熊枚 | | 3 May 1802 | | Stand-in as the Left Censor-in-Chief |
| | Yan Jian 顏檢 | | 9 May 1802 | | Stand-in as the Provincial Governor of Henan |
| 26 | Yan Jian 顏檢 | | 27 September 1802 | 4 July 1805 | Demoted to a zhushi (主事) |
| | Xiong Mei 熊枚 | | 4 July 1805 | | Stand-in as the Secretary of Works |
| 27 | Wu Xiongguang 吳熊光 | | 4 July 1805 | 12 December 1805 | Reassigned to serve as the Viceroy of Liangguang |
| | Qiu Xingjian 裘行簡 | | 6 November 1805 | | Stand-in as the Lieutenant-Governor of Zhili |
| | Qiu Xingjian 裘行簡 | | 12 December 1805 | | Stand-in as the Lieutenant-Governor of Zhili and acting Vice Secretary of Defence |
| | Qin Cheng'en 秦承恩 | | 8 November 1806 | | Stand-in as the Secretary of Justice |
| | Wen Chenghui 溫承惠 | | 23 November 1806 | | Stand-in as the Provincial Governor of Fujian |
| 28 | Wen Chenghui 溫承惠 | | 16 October 1807 | 5 November 1813 | Dismissed from office |
| | Zhang Xu 章煦 | | 10 October 1813 | | Stand-in as the Secretary of Works |
| | Zuo Wenning 左文寧 | | 9 December 1813 | | Stand-in as the Left Vice Secretary of Personnel |
| 29 | Na Yancheng 那彥成 | | 5 November 1813 | 24 July 1816 | Dismissed from office |
| 30 | Fang Shouchou 方受疇 | | 24 July 1816 | 29 January 1822 | Left office due to illness |
| | Changling 長齡 | | 29 January 1822 | 18 February 1822 | Stand-in as the Viceroy of Shaan-Gan |
| | Tu Zhishen 屠之申 | | 18 February 1822 | | Stand-in as the Lieutenant-Governor of Zhili |
| | Songyun 松筠 | | 18 January 1822 | | Stand-in as the Secretary of Personnel |
| 31 | Yan Jian 顏檢 | | 29 January 1822 | 15 May 1823 | Reassigned to serve as Vice Secretary of Storage (倉場侍郎) |
| 32 | Jiang Youxian 蔣攸銛 | | 15 May 1823 | 7 December 1825 | Reassigned to serve in the Imperial Cabinet |
| 33 | Na Yancheng 那彥成 | | 7 December 1825 | 25 March 1831 | Dismissed from office |
| | Mingshan 明山 | | 22 December 1827 | 26 December 1827 | Stand-in as the Secretary of Justice |
| | Tu Zhishen 屠之申 | | 26 December 1827 | 18 May 1829 | Stand-in as the Lieutenant-Governor of Zhili |
| | Songyun 松筠 | | 21 May 1829 | | Stand-in as the Secretary of Rites |
| | Wang Ding 王鼎 | | 25 March 1831 | | Stand-in as the Secretary of Revenue |
| 34 | Qishan 琦善 | | 25 March 1831 | 14 April 1837 | Left office for filial mourning |
| | Mujangga 穆彰阿 | | 14 April 1837 | | Stand-in as the Grand Secretary |
| | Qishan 琦善 | | 25 July 1837 | 28 September 1840 | Reassigned |
| | Nergingge 訥爾經額 | | 28 September 1840 | 26 February 1841 | Stand-in as the Viceroy of Shaan-Gan |
| 34 | Nergingge 訥爾經額 | | 26 February 1841 | 6 October 1853 | Dismissed from office |
| 35 | Guiliang 桂良 | | 6 October 1853 | 21 January 1857 | Promoted to Grand Secretary of the Eastern Cabinet (東閣大學士) |
| | Tan Tingxiang 譚廷襄 | | 21 January 1857 | 26 April 1858 | Stand-in as the Provincial Governor of Shaanxi |
| 36 | Tan Tingxiang 譚廷襄 | | 26 April 1858 | 26 July 1858 | Dismissed |
| | Ruilin 瑞麟 | | 26 July 1858 | | Stand-in as the Secretary of Rites |
| 37 | Qingqi 慶祺 | | 26 July 1858 | 25 March 1859 | Died in office |
| | Wenyu 文煜 | | 25 March 1859 | | Stand-in as the Lieutenant-Governor of Zhili |
| 38 | Hengfu 恒福 | | 25 March 1859 | 26 February 1861 | Left office due to illness |
| | Wenyu 文煜 | | 26 February 1861 | 14 February 1863 | Stand-in as the Provincial Governor of Shandong |
| | Chonghou 崇厚 | | 14 February 1863 | 20 April 1863 | Stand-in as the Left Vice Secretary of Defence |
| 39 | Liu Changyou 劉長佑 | | 14 February 1863 | 29 November 1867 | Dismissed from office |
| | Guanwen 官文 | | 29 November 1867 | 6 September 1868 | Stand-in as the Grand Secretary of Wenhua Hall (文華殿大學士) |
| 40 | Zeng Guofan 曾國藩 | | 6 September 1868 | 29 August 1870 | Reassigned to serve as the Viceroy of Liangjiang |
| 41 | Li Hongzhang 李鴻章 | | 29 August 1870 | 26 April 1882 | Left office for filial mourning |
| | Zhang Shusheng 張樹聲 | | 19 April 1882 | 13 July 1883 | Stand-in as the Viceroy of Liangguang |
| | Li Hongzhang 李鴻章 | | 13 July 1883 | 23 September 1884 | Acting Viceroy of Zhili |
| 42 | Li Hongzhang 李鴻章 | | 23 September 1884 | 28 August 1895 | Reassigned to the Imperial Cabinet |
| | Wang Wenshao 王文韶 | | 13 February 1895 | 28 August 1895 | Stand-in as the Viceroy of Yun-Gui |
| 43 | Wang Wenshao 王文韶 | | 28 August 1895 | 23 June 1898 | Promoted to Secretary of Revenue |
| | Ronglu 榮祿 | | 15 June 1898 | 23 June 1898 | Stand-in as the Grand Secretary |
| 44 | Ronglu 榮祿 | | 23 June 1898 | 25 September 1898 | Recalled to the capital |
| | Yuan Shikai 袁世凱 | | 25 September 1898 | | Stand-in as an acting Vice Secretary |
| 45 | Yulu 裕祿 | | 28 September 1898 | 27 July 1900 | Died in office |
| | Tingyong 廷雍 | | 9 August 1900 | | Stand-in as the Lieutenant-Governor of Zhili |
| 46 | Li Hongzhang 李鴻章 | | 8 July 1900 | 7 November 1901 | Died in office |
| | Zhou Fu 周馥 | | 7 November 1901 | | Stand-in as the Lieutenant-Governor of Zhili |
| | Yuan Shikai 袁世凱 | | 7 November 1901 | 9 June 1902 | Stand-in as the Provincial Governor of Shandong |
| 47 | Yuan Shikai 袁世凱 | | 9 June 1902 | 4 September 1907 | Promoted to Secretary of Foreign Affairs |
| | Wu Chongxi 吳重熹 | | 18 October 1902 | | Stand-in as the Lieutenant-Governor of Zhili |
| | Yang Shixiang 楊士驤 | | 5 September 1907 | 23 July 1908 | Stand-in as the Provincial Governor of Shandong |
| 48 | Yang Shixiang 楊士驤 | | 23 July 1908 | 28 June 1909 | Died in office |
| | Natong 那桐 | | 28 June 1909 | | Stand-in as the Grand Secretary and Assisting Minister of Foreign Affairs |
| 49 | Duanfang 端方 | | 28 June 1909 | 23 January 1910 | Dismissed from office |
| | Cui Yong'an 崔永安 | | 23 January 1910 | | Stand-in as the Lieutenant-Governor of Zhili |
| 50 | Chen Kuilong 陳夔龍 | | 23 January 1910 | 3 February 1912 | Left office due to illness |
| | Zhang Zhenfang 張鎮芳 | | 3 February 1912 | | Acting Viceroy of Zhili |
