= Yengišan =

Qing dynasty politician

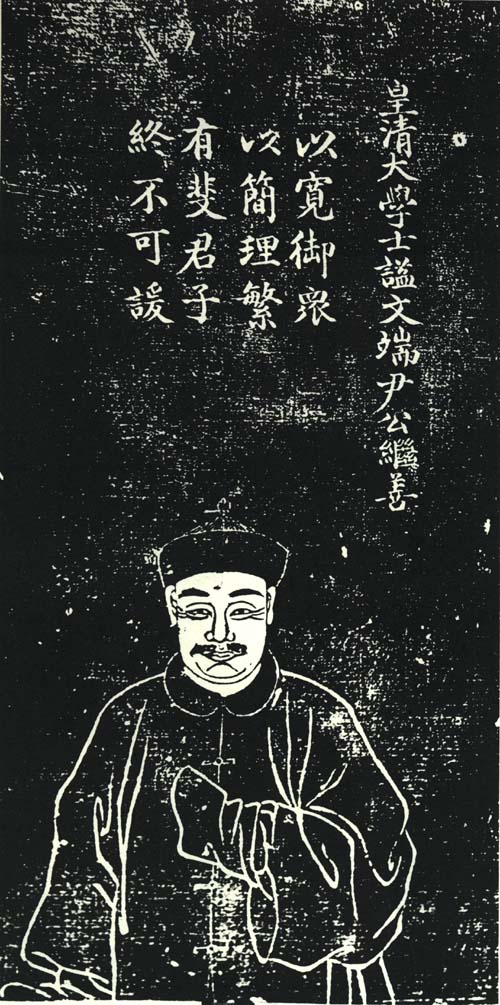

Chief Grand Councillor
- In office 2 September 1770 – 4 June 1771
- Preceded by: Fuheng
- Succeeded by: Liu Tongxun

Grand Councillor
- In office 26 October 1765 – 4 June 1771
- In office 19 November 1748 – 24 November 1748

Grand Secretary of the Wenhua Hall
- In office 2 May 1764 – 4 June 1771

Assistant Grand Secretary
- In office 18 December 1748 – 18 January 1749

Viceroy of Shaan-Gan
- In office 17 June 1753 – 16 October 1753
- Preceded by: Huang Tinggui
- Succeeded by: Yongchang
- In office 2 April 1750 – 25 July 1751
- Preceded by: Hūboo
- Succeeded by: Huang Tinggui
- In office 24 November 1748 – 15 October 1749
- Preceded by: himself as the Viceroy of Chuan-Shaan
- Succeeded by: Hūboo

Viceroy of Chuan-Shaan
- In office 24 November 1748 – 18 January 1749
- Preceded by: Ts'ereng
- Succeeded by: himself as the Viceroy of Shaan-Gan
- In office 5 April 1740 – 11 March 1743
- Preceded by: Omida
- Succeeded by: Martai

Minister of Revenue
- In office 24 November 1748 – 18 January 1749
- Preceded by: Fuheng
- Succeeded by: Šuhede

Viceroy of Liangguang
- In office 28 October 1748 – 24 November 1748
- Preceded by: Ts'ereng
- Succeeded by: Šose

Viceroy of Liangjiang
- In office 26 September 1754 – 9 May 1765
- Preceded by: Oyonggo
- Succeeded by: Gao Jin
- In office 25 July 1751 – 16 October 1753
- Preceded by: Huang Tinggui
- Succeeded by: Zhuang Yougong
- In office 11 March 1743 – 28 October 1748
- Preceded by: Depei
- Succeeded by: Ts'ereng
- In office 8 August 1731 – 24 October 1732
- Preceded by: Gao Qizhuo
- Succeeded by: Wei Tingzhen

Minister of Justice
- In office 4 November 1737 – 5 April 1740
- Preceded by: Nasutu
- Succeeded by: Nasutu

Personal details
- Born: 21 May 1695 Liaodong
- Died: 4 June 1771 (aged 76) Beijing, China
- Parent: Yentai (father)

Yengišan (Manchu: ᠶᡝᠨᡤᡳᡧᠠᠨ, romanized: yengišan; Chinese: 尹繼善; 21 May 1695 – 4 June 1771) was a Manchu official of the Qing dynasty, who was part of the Bordered Yellow Banner. He served various official positions during the Qing dynasty. His father is Yentai (尹泰).

Government offices
Preceded by Ts'ereng	Viceroy of Liangguang; 1748─1748	Succeeded by Šose
