= Zeng Guofan =

Chinese politician and military commander (1811–1872)

First Class Marquis of Yiyong Zeng Guofan
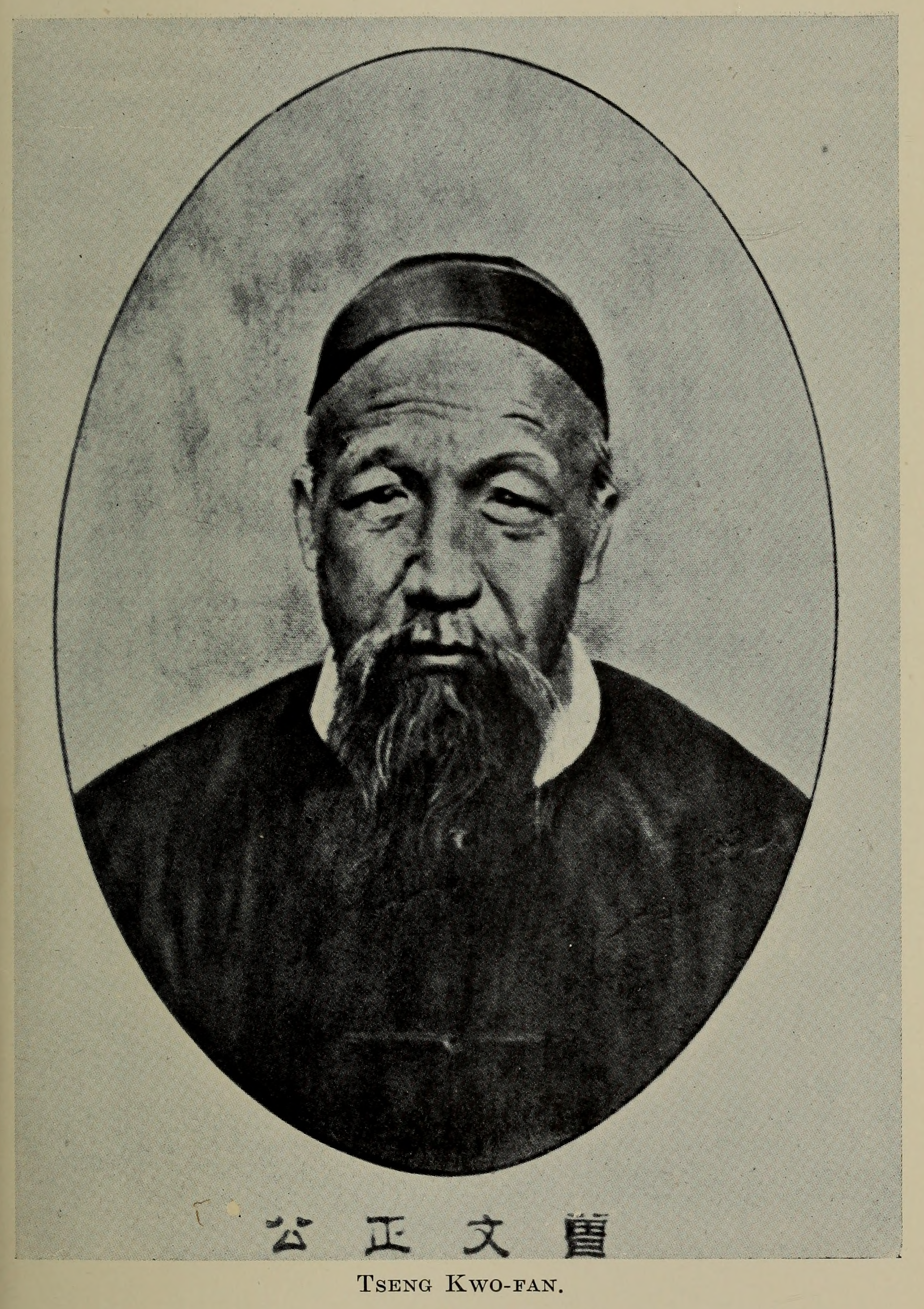

Grand Secretary of the Wuying Hall
- In office 1868–1872

Assistant Grand Secretary
- In office 1862–1868

Viceroy of Liangjiang
- In office 1870–1872
- Preceded by: Ma Xinyi
- Succeeded by: He Jing
- In office 1860–1864
- Preceded by: He Guiqing
- Succeeded by: Ma Xinyi

Viceroy of Zhili
- In office 1868–1870
- Preceded by: Guanwen
- Succeeded by: Li Hongzhang

Personal details
- Born: 26 November 1811 Xiangxiang, Hunan, Qing dynasty
- Died: 12 March 1872 (aged 60) Nanjing, Qing dynasty
- Children: Zeng Jize
- Relatives: Zeng Guoquan (brother)
- Education: Jinshi degree in the imperial examination
- Occupation: Statesman, general

Military service
- Allegiance: Qing dynasty
- Branch/service: Xiang Army
- Years of service: 1853–1872
- Battles/wars: Taiping Rebellion; Nian Rebellion; Tianjin Massacre

Chinese name
- Traditional Chinese: 曾國藩
- Simplified Chinese: 曾国藩
- Hanyu Pinyin: Zēng Guófān (Note: Or Zēng Guófán)
Transcriptions
Standard Mandarin
- Hanyu Pinyin: Zēng Guófān (Note: Or Zēng Guófán)
- Wade–Giles: Tseng^{1} Kuo^{2}-fan^{1}
- IPA: [tsə́ŋ kwǒ.fán]
Yue: Cantonese
- Yale Romanization: Jāng Gwok-fàahn
- Jyutping: Zang1 Gwok3-faan4
Southern Min
- Tâi-lô: Tsan Kok-phuan

Birth name
- Chinese: 曾子城
- Hanyu Pinyin: Zēng Zǐchéng
Transcriptions
Standard Mandarin
- Hanyu Pinyin: Zēng Zǐchéng

Zeng Guofan, Marquis Yiyong (traditional Chinese: 曾國藩; simplified Chinese: 曾国藩; pinyin: Zēng Guófān; Wade–Giles: Tseng^{1} Kuo^{2}-fan^{1}; 26 November 1811 – 12 March 1872), birth name Zeng Zicheng, courtesy name Bohan (伯涵), was a Chinese statesman and military general of the late Qing dynasty. He is best known for raising and organizing the Xiang Army to aid the Qing military in suppressing the Taiping Rebellion and restoring the stability of the Qing Empire. Along with other prominent figures such as Zuo Zongtang and Li Hongzhang of his time, Zeng set the scene for the Tongzhi Restoration, an attempt to arrest the decline of the Qing dynasty. Zeng was known for his strategic perception, administrative skill and noble personality on Confucian practice, but also for his ruthlessness in repressing rebellions.

== Early life ==
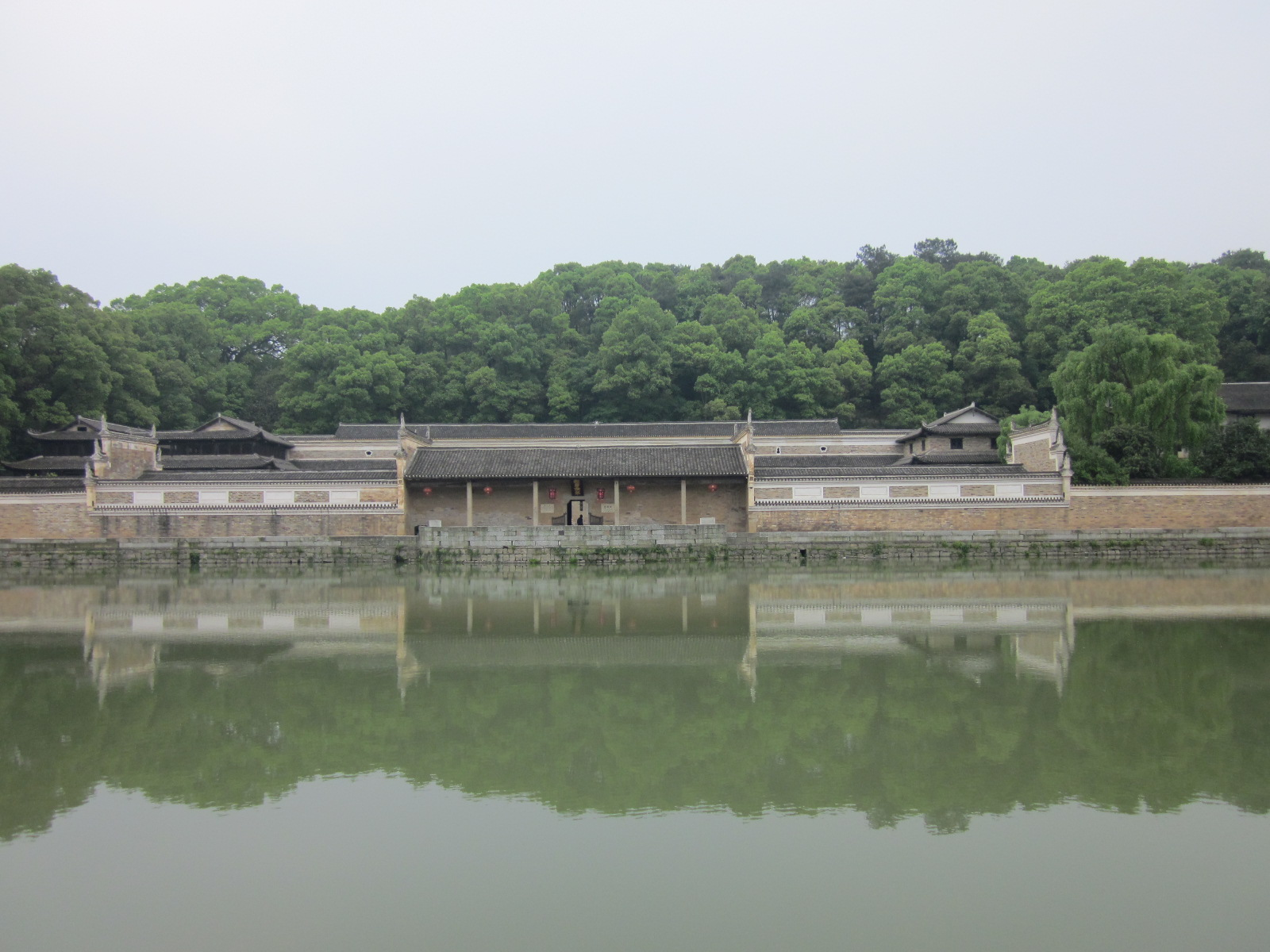
Zeng's former residence in Hunan

Born Zeng Zicheng in Xiangxiang, Hunan Province in 1811, Zeng was the grandson of Zeng Yuping, a farmer with social and political ambitions. He was also a descendant of the philosopher Zengzi, a student of Confucius. He studied in Yuelu Academy in Changsha Prefecture, where he passed the prefectural examination in 1833, only a year after his father, Zeng Linshu. He passed the provincial examination (juren) a year later, and by 1838, at age 27, he had passed the imperial examination, a prestigious achievement in China. He had earned the jinshi degree, the highest level in the civil service examinations, which led to his appointment to the Hanlin Academy, a body of outstanding Chinese literary scholars who performed literary tasks for the imperial court. It was at the Hanlin Academy where Zeng changed his given name to "Guofan", which sounded more prestigious. Zeng served in Beijing for more than 13 years, and remained devoted to the interpretation of the Confucian classics. He moved relatively quickly up the ranks with the aid of his teacher, Mujangga; within five years, he had become a second-grade official.

== Entry into imperial politics ==
In 1843, Zeng was appointed as the chief literary examiner in Sichuan Province. Six years later, he was made Senior Deputy Secretary of the Board of Rites. When holding the office of Military Examiner (1851), he was compelled by the death of his mother to return to Hunan Province to carry out filial mourning, which is supposed to last three years. Around the time, the Taiping rebels had overrun Hunan Province and captured the cities and strongholds on both shores of the Yangtze River. By a special decree, Zeng was ordered to assist the provincial governor in raising a volunteer force, and, on his own initiative, he built a fleet of war junks and multiple arsenals, with which he attacked the rebels. This force eventually became known as the Xiang Army (a.k.a. Hunan Army or Chu Army). In training and commanding the Xiang Army, Zeng emphasized "family ties, individual responsibility, flexible yet responsible discipline, enhanced military pay, respect for intellectuals serving in the army, and a strong bond between officers and soldiers." In his first engagement with the rebels, Zeng was defeated, but his lieutenants were more successful. They recovered the provincial capital, Changsha, and destroyed the rebel fleet. Following up these victories of his subordinates, Zeng recaptured Wuchang and Hanyang, near Hankou, and was rewarded for his success by being appointed vice-president of the Board of War. The Xiang Army under Zeng contained some integrated Hangzhou drill groups.

== Fame and military campaigns ==
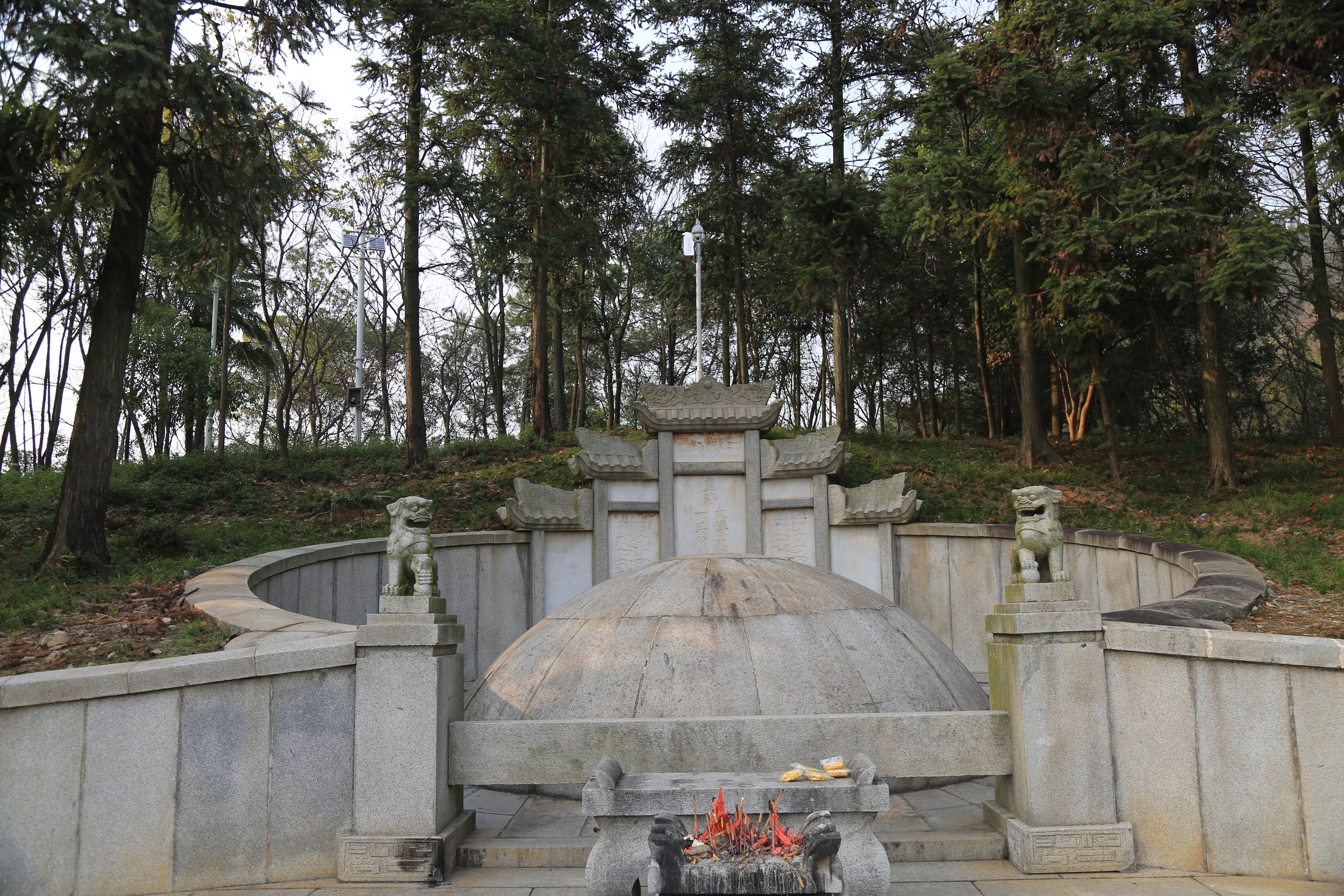
Zeng's tomb in Yuelu District of Changsha, Hunan.

In 1853, other triumphs led to Zeng being made a baturu, and to his being decorated with a yellow riding-jacket. Meanwhile, in his absence, the rebels retook Wuchang and burnt the protecting fleet. The tide quickly turned, however, on May 1, 1854, Zeng defeated the Taiping at Xiangtan and in July at Yuezhou. Zeng succeeded in clearing the country round Poyang Lake, and subsequently in ridding Jiangsu Province of the rebels. In January–February 1855 the Xiang Army sufferers a disastrous defeat at Jiujiang, Jiangxi, leading to Zeng attempting suicide. His father died in 1857, and after a brief mourning he was ordered to take supreme command in Zhejiang Province, and to cooperate with the governor of Fujian Province in defence.

Subsequently, the rebels were driven westwards, and Zeng would have started in pursuit had he not been called on to clear Anhui Province of rebel forces. In June 1860, he was appointed Viceroy of Liangjiang (covering Jiangxi, Anhui and Jiangsu provinces) and Imperial Commissioner, overseeing military affairs. At this time, and for some time previously, he had been fortunate in having the active support of Zuo Zongtang, who at a later period recovered Kashgar for the Qing Empire, and of Li Hongzhang. Like all true leaders of men, Zeng knew how to reward good service, and when occasion offered he appointed the former to the governorship of Zhejiang and the latter to that of Jiangsu. In 1862, he was appointed Assistant Grand Secretary of State. At this time, the Qing imperial forces, assisted by the Ever Victorious Army, had checked the progress of the Taiping Rebellion, and Zeng was able to carry out a scheme which he had long formulated of besieging Tianjing, the rebel capital. While Charles George Gordon of the Ever Victorious Army was clearing the cities on the lower waters of the Yangtze River with support from Li Hongzhang, Zeng drew closer his besieging lines around the city.

In July 1864, Tianjing fell into Zeng's hands, and he was rewarded with the noble peerage "First Class Marquis Yiyong" (一等毅勇侯) and the right to wear the double-eyed peacock's feather. He, Zuo Zongtang and Li Hongzhang were collectively called "Zeng, Zuo, Li" – the military leaders who suppressed the Taiping Rebellion. After the suppression of the rebellion, the Nian Rebellion, which overlapped in time with the Taiping movement, broke out in Shandong Province, and Zeng was sent to quell it.

Success did not, however, always attend him on this campaign, and by imperial order he was relieved of his command by Li Hongzhang, who in the same way succeeded him as the Viceroy of Zhili, where, after the Tianjin Massacre (1870), Zeng failed to carry out the wishes of the imperial court. Instead of the desired policy towards foreigners, Zeng took on a more diplomatic stance. After this rebuff, he retired to his viceroyalty at Nanjing, where he died in 1872 mysteriously in Hong Xiuquan's former mansion.

== Personal life ==
Zeng was a voluminous writer. His papers addressed to the throne and his literary disquisitions are held in high esteem by Chinese scholars, who treasure the edition of his collected works in 156 books, which was edited by Li Hongzhang in 1876, as a memorial of a great and incorruptible statesman. Zeng enjoyed reading and held a special interest in the Twenty-Four Histories and other Chinese classics.

In his public writing, Zeng criticized what he deemed as an overly fatalistic view among Chinese.

Zeng was viewed as accomplished in spirit writing and physigonomy. He attributed some of his successes to good feng shui, including the proper burial of his grandmother.

Zeng called Hakka females "big foot hillbilly witches" during the Taiping Rebellion after encountering them for the first time.

Unlike his contemporaries, who had multiple wives or kept concubines, Zeng was officially married only once, to a woman of the Ouyang family when he was in his late teens. He had three sons and five daughters with her, and two of his eldest children died young. His eldest son, Zeng Jize, who inherited his noble peerage "First Class Marquis Yiyong", went on to become a famous diplomat in the late Qing dynasty.

Zeng's ninth brother, Zeng Guoquan, was an ambitious general in the Xiang Army. He was later appointed Viceroy of Liangjiang in 1884. Zeng's great-granddaughter, Zeng Baosun, was a feminist, historian, and Christian educator.

Zeng is said to be a descendant of Zengzi, who in turn was said to be a descendant of King Shao Kang of the Xia dynasty.

== Family letters ==
Zeng Guofan's Family Letters (Chinese: 曾國藩家書; pinyin: Zēng Guófān Jiā Shū), also known as the Family Letters of Zeng Guofan, is a collection of personal correspondence written by Zeng to his family members, including his parents, sons, brothers, and other relatives.

Comprising nearly 1,500 letters spanning from 1840 during the Daoguang era to 1867 in the Tongzhi era, with notable examples such as twelve letters to his eldest son Zeng Jize between 1852 and 1865, the letters were primarily composed during Zeng's lifetime amid his military campaigns against the Taiping Rebellion and his official duties. The content focused on practical advice rooted in Confucian principles, covering topics such as self-cultivation, education, family governance, moral conduct, study habits, interpersonal relations, governance, business, and friendship, often portraying Zeng as a devoted and instructive parent emphasizing diligence, humility, and ethical self-improvement.

== Legacy ==
Zeng's legacy in history is twofold. On one hand he is criticised as a staunchly conservative traitor, but on another he is seen as a hero in preserving order and stability. Many in China and abroad admire his ability to successfully survive in the ruthless bureaucracy of the late Qing dynasty. Many have blamed Zeng for all the civilian losses and damages done during the Taiping Rebellion, while others criticise him for being too friendly with certain foreign ideas. Much Chinese language historiography, including numerous biographies, has questioned what made him fight for an essentially foreign dynasty.

Since the Cultural Revolution, criticism of Zeng gradually began to disappear. Tang Haoming published in 1992 his three-book trilogy Zeng Guofan, a novelisation of Zeng's life during and after the Taiping Rebellion. This trilogy characterised Zeng as a common person, but had adopted a much more positive view of Zeng. Mao Zedong and Chiang Kai-shek also praised Zeng's ability in military and political affairs.

In recent years, Zeng's life and his works have been widely celebrated, especially as an example of local pride in Hunan Province. Zeng's leadership and military skills had been used by many as a new field of thought aiding in business or bureaucratic dealings, as in the "self-help" 99 Strategems from Zeng Guofan.

== Succession of the First Class Marquis Yiyong peerage ==
Order	Name	Title	Lifespan	Tenure	Notes
1	Zeng Guofan 曾國藩	First Class Marquis Yiyong Wenzheng 一等毅勇文正侯	1811–1872	1864–1872	
2	Zeng Jize 曾紀澤	First Class Marquis Yiyong Huimin 一等毅勇惠敏侯	1839–1890	1877–1890	Zeng Guofan's eldest son
3	Zeng Guangluan 曾廣鑾	First Class Marquis Yiyong 一等毅勇侯	1873–1920	1890–1912	Zeng Jize's third son

== See also ==
- Former Residence of Zeng Guofan
- Tomb of Zeng Guofan
- Taqibu

== Notes ==
Government offices
Preceded by He Guiqing	Viceroy of Liangjiang (1st time); 1860–1864	Succeeded by Ma Xinyi
Preceded by Guanwen (acting)	Viceroy of Zhili; 1868–1870	Succeeded by Li Hongzhang
Preceded by Ma Xinyi	Viceroy of Liangjiang (2nd time); 1870–1872	Succeeded by He Jing
