= 1846 in China =

- Decades: 1820s; 1830s; 1840s; 1850s; 1860s
- See also: Other events of 1846; History of China • Timeline • Years

Events from the year 1846 in China.

== Incumbents ==
- Daoguang Emperor (26th year)

=== Viceroys ===
- Viceroy of Zhili — Nergingge
- Viceroy of Min-Zhe — Yang Yizeng
- Viceroy of Huguang — Yutai
- Viceroy of Shaan-Gan — ?
- Viceroy of Liangguang — Qiying
- Viceroy of Yun-Gui — Lin Zexu, Lin Xingyuan
- Viceroy of Sichuan — Qishan
- Viceroy of Liangjiang — Bichang (21 January 1845 - 30 April 1847)

== Events ==
- Banqiao District established in Fujian (now Taiwan)
- Astor House Hotel (Shanghai) (礼查饭店), established in 1846 as Richards' Hotel and Restaurant (礼查饭店) on The Bund
