= 1840 in China =

- Decades: 1820s; 1830s; 1840s; 1850s; 1860s
- See also: Other events of 1840; History of China • Timeline • Years

Events from the year 1840 in China.

== Incumbents ==
- Daoguang Emperor (20th year)

=== Viceroys ===
- Viceroy of Zhili — Qishan then Nergingge
- Viceroy of Min-Zhe — Deng Tingzhen then Yan Botao
- Viceroy of Huguang — Yutai
- Viceroy of Shaan-Gan — Hūsungge then Nergingge then Hūsungge then Enteheng'e
- Viceroy of Liangguang — Deng Tingzhen then Lin Zexu then Yiliang then Qishan
- Viceroy of Yun-Gui — Guiliang
- Viceroy of Sichuan — Gioro-Baoxing
- Viceroy of Liangjiang — Chen Luan then Deng Tingzhen then IIibu

== Events ==
=== Ongoing ===
- Opium War
