= 1847 in China =

- Decades: 1820s; 1830s; 1840s; 1850s; 1860s
- See also: Other events of 1847; History of China • Timeline • Years

Events from the year 1847 in China.

== Incumbents ==
- Daoguang Emperor (27th year)

=== Viceroys ===
- Viceroy of Zhili — Nergingge
- Viceroy of Min-Zhe — Yang Yizeng
- Viceroy of Huguang — Yutai
- Viceroy of Shaan-Gan — ?
- Viceroy of Liangguang — Qiying
- Viceroy of Yun-Gui — Lin Zexu, Lin Xingyuan
- Viceroy of Sichuan — Qishan
- Viceroy of Liangjiang:
  - Bichang (21 January 1845 - 30 April 1847)
  - Lu Jianying (8 March 1847 - 30 April 1847, Stand-in as Provincial Governor of Jiangsu)
  - Li Xingyuan (30 April 1847 – 26 April 1849, Left office due to illness)

== Events ==
- March — Treaty of Canton, the first treaty made between Sweden-Norway and the Chinese Empire
- August 27 — Hong Xiuquan returned to the Thistle Mountains from Hua County, the God Worshipers numbered over 2,000. At this time, most God Worshippers were peasants and miners.
- The Presbyterian Church of England founded and resolved to establish a mission in China. The Rev. William Chalmers Burns went first to Hong Kong and then to Amoy
- American Methodist Episcopal Society (North) entered the field of China

== Births ==
- Au Fung-Chi (1847–1914), the secretary of the Hong Kong Department of Chinese Affairs
