= 1844 in China =

- Decades: 1820s; 1830s; 1840s; 1850s; 1860s
- See also: Other events of 1844; History of China • Timeline • Years

Events from the year 1844 in China.

== Incumbents ==
- Daoguang Emperor (24th year)

=== Viceroys ===
- Viceroy of Zhili — Nergingge
- Viceroy of Min-Zhe — Lin Yunke
- Viceroy of Huguang — Yutai
- Viceroy of Shaan-Gan — Funiyang'a
- Viceroy of Liangguang — Qi Gong then Qiying
- Viceroy of Yun-Gui — Guiliang
- Viceroy of Sichuan — Gioro-Baoxing
- Viceroy of Liangjiang — Qiying then Bichang/Sun Shanbao

== Events ==
- 3 July — Treaty of Wanghia signed by the Great Qing Empire and the United States at the Kun Iam Temple in Macau, Portuguese Macau
- The Chinese Union, an early Chinese Protestant Christian missionary society that was involved in preaching to Chinese and sending Chinese workers to mainland China during the late Qing dynasty was founded by Karl Gützlaff in 1844, Hong Kong
- Renji Hospital, the first western hospital in Shanghai, established
- Mary Ann Aldersey, an eccentric British woman, who opens a school for girls in Ningbo
