= 1848 in China =

- Decades: 1820s; 1830s; 1840s; 1850s; 1860s
- See also: Other events of 1848; History of China • Timeline • Years

Events that took place from 1848, in China.

== Incumbents ==
- Daoguang Emperor (28th year)

=== Viceroys ===
- Viceroy of Zhili — Nergingge
- Viceroy of Min-Zhe — Wang Yide
- Viceroy of Huguang — Yutai
- Viceroy of Shaan-Gan — ?
- Viceroy of Liangguang — Qiying
- Viceroy of Yun-Gui — Lin Zexu, Lin Xingyuan
- Viceroy of Sichuan — Qishan
- Viceroy of Liangjiang — Li Xingyuan

== Events ==
- In January 1848, God-Worshipping Society leader, Feng Yunshan was arrested and banished to Guangdong by the local authorities.
- January — California Gold Rush starts, as gold was discovered at Sutters mill, which inspires thousands of Chinese people to travel to America, in search of gold.
- The first horse race was organized in Shanghai (see Shanghai Race Club).
- Roman Catholic Archdiocese of Guangzhou was established.

== Births ==
- Sun Yirang (孫詒讓; Sūn Yíràng; 1848–1908) was a philologist and scholar of the Mozi.
- Cheng Tinghua (程廷華; 1848–1900), was a renowned master of Chinese neijia (internal) martial art baguazhang.
