= 1839 in China =

- Decades: 1810s; 1820s; 1830s; 1840s; 1850s
- See also: Other events of 1839; History of China • Timeline • Years

Events from the year 1839 in China.

== Incumbents ==
- Daoguang Emperor (19th year)

=== Viceroys ===
- Viceroy of Zhili — Qishan
- Viceroy of Min-Zhe — Zhong Xiang then Zhou Tianjie then Guiliang then Deng Tingzhen
- Viceroy of Huguang — Zhou Tianjie then Guiliang then Yutai
- Viceroy of Shaan-Gan — Hūsungge
- Viceroy of Liangguang — Deng Tingzhen
- Viceroy of Yun-Gui — IIibu then Deng Tingzhen then Guiliang
- Viceroy of Sichuan — Gioro-Baoxing
- Viceroy of Liangjiang — Tao Zhu then Lin Zexu then Chen Luan

== Events ==
- Daoguang Emperor appointed scholar-official Lin Zexu to the post of Special Imperial Commissioner with the task of eradicating the opium trade. He bans the trade of opium and writes a letter to Queen Victoria asking her to stop the illegal importation of opium
- early July 1839 - a group of British merchant sailors in Kowloon became intoxicated after consuming rice liqueur. Two of the sailors became agitated with and beat to death Lin Weixi, a villager from nearby Tsim Sha Tsui. They are disciplined by British military court and the British refuse to hand them over to Chinese prosecutors

=== Ongoing ===
- Opium War
