= 1845 in China =

- Decades: 1820s; 1830s; 1840s; 1850s; 1860s
- See also: Other events of 1845; History of China • Timeline • Years

Events from the year 1845 in China.

== Incumbents ==
- Daoguang Emperor (25th year)

=== Viceroys ===
- Viceroy of Zhili — Nergingge
- Viceroy of Min-Zhe — Lin Yunke
- Viceroy of Huguang — Yutai
- Viceroy of Shaan-Gan — Funiyang'a
- Viceroy of Liangguang — Qiying
- Viceroy of Yun-Gui — Guiliang then He Changling
- Viceroy of Sichuan — Gioro-Baoxing
- Viceroy of Liangjiang — Sun Shanbao then Bichang

== Events ==
- British Concession (Shanghai) created by the 1845 Land Regulations
- a wave of Jewish immigration occurs to Shanghai

== Births ==
- Zhao Erfeng (1845–1911), courtesy name Jihe, was a Qing Dynasty official and Han Chinese bannerman, who belonged to the Plain Blue Banner. He is known for being the last amban in Tibet, appointed in March, 1908
- Li Rongfa (李容發; 1845–1891) was an eminent military leader of the Taiping Rebellion, and known during his military tenure as King of Zhong the second (忠二王)
- Wang Yirong (王懿榮; 1845–1900) was a director of the Chinese Imperial Academy, best known as the first to recognize that the symbols inscribed on oracle bones were an early form of Chinese writing
- Ma Jianzhong (馬建忠; 1845 Dantu, Jiangsu province –1900), courtesy name Meishu (眉叔), also known as Ma Kié-Tchong in French, was a Chinese official and scholar in the late Qing Dynasty
- Xu Jingcheng (許景澄; 1845 – 28 July 1900) was a Chinese diplomat and Qing politician supportive of the Hundred Days' Reform
