= 1841 in China =

- Decades: 1820s; 1830s; 1840s; 1850s; 1860s
- See also: Other events of 1841; History of China • Timeline • Years

Events from the year 1841 in China.

== Incumbents ==
- Daoguang Emperor (21st year)

=== Viceroys ===
- Viceroy of Zhili — Nergingge
- Viceroy of Min-Zhe — Yan Botao then Yang Guozhen
- Viceroy of Huguang — Yutai
- Viceroy of Shaan-Gan — Enteheng'e
- Viceroy of Liangguang — Qishan then Qi Gong
- Viceroy of Yun-Gui — Guiliang
- Viceroy of Sichuan — Gioro-Baoxing
- Viceroy of Liangjiang — Yuqian then Niu Jian

== Events ==
=== Ongoing ===
- Opium War
  - 7 January — Second Battle of Chuenpi at the Bocca Tigris forts, British capture the Humen straits
  - 20 January — publication of the terms of the Convention of Chuenpi, signed between British Plenipotentiary Charles Elliot and Chinese Imperial Commissioner Qishan during the First Opium War between the United Kingdom and the Qing dynasty of China
  - Convention of Chuenpi rejected, hostilities resume
  - 23–26 February — Battle of the Bogue, British forces capture the rest of the Bogue forts
  - 27 February — Battle of First Bar, Nemesis sank Cambridge, an old, but re-armed East Indiaman that the Chinese had purchased.
  - 13–15 March — Broadway expedition on and aided in the capture of Canton on 18 March.
  - the British expedition divided its forces, sending one fleet south to the Pearl River while sending a second fleet north to the Yellow Sea. The northern fleet sailed to the Hai River, where Elliot personally presented Palmerston's letter to the Emperor to Qing authorities from the capital. Qishan (ᡴᡳᡧᠠᠨ), a high-ranking Manchu official, was selected by the Imperial Court to replace Lin as the Viceroy of Liangguang after the latter was discharged for his failure to resolve the opium situation.
  - late spring — reinforcements arrived from British India in preparation for an offensive against Canton
  - Accompanying the fleet as far as Macau was the newly constructed iron steamer HMS Nemesis, a weapon to which the Chinese navy had no effective counter.
  - 19 August — three British warships and 380 marines drove the Chinese from the land bridge (known as "The Barrier") separating Macau from mainland China.
  - The defeat of the Qing soldiers coupled with the arrival of the Nemesis in Macau's harbor resulted in a wave of pro-British support in the city, and several Qing officials were driven out or killed. Portugal remained neutral in the conflict, but after the battle was willing to allow British ships to dock in Macau, a decision that granted the British a functioning port in Southern China.
  - With the strategic harbors of Dinghai and Macau secured, the British began to focus on the war on the Pearl River. Five months after the British victory at Chusan, the northern elements of the expedition sailed south to Humen, known to the British as The Bogue. Bremer judged that gaining control of the Pearl River and Canton would put the British in a strong negotiating position with the Qing authorities, as well as allow for the renewal of trade when the war ended.
  - Fighting ceased for the winter of 1841 while the British resupplied. False reports sent by Yishan to the Emperor in Beijing resulted in the continued British threat being downplayed. In late 1841 the Daoguang Emperor discovered that his officials in Canton and Amoy had been sending him embellished reports. He ordered the governor of Guangxi, Liang Chang-chü, to send him clear accounts of the events in Canton, noting that since Guangxi was a neighboring province, Liang must be receiving independent accounts. He warned Liang that he would be able to verify his information by obtaining secret inquiries from other places. Yishan was recalled to the capital and faced trial by the imperial court, which removed him from command. Now aware of the severity of the British threat, Chinese towns and cities began to fortify against naval incursions.
