= 1843 in China =

- Decades: 1820s; 1830s; 1840s; 1850s; 1860s
- See also: Other events of 1843; History of China • Timeline • Years

Events from the year 1843 in China.

== Incumbents ==
- Daoguang Emperor (23rd year)

=== Viceroys ===
- Viceroy of Zhili — Nergingge
- Viceroy of Min-Zhe —
- Viceroy of Huguang —
- Viceroy of Shaan-Gan — ?
- Viceroy of Liangguang —
- Viceroy of Yun-Gui —
- Viceroy of Sichuan —
- Viceroy of Liangjiang —

== Events ==
- October 8 — Treaty of the Bogue signed between China and the United Kingdom, concluded in October 1843 to supplement the previous Treaty of Nanking
- the first Treaty Ports were opened
- Anglican diocese of Shanghai established after Rev. William Jones Boone appointed Bishop in Shanghai
- Publication of the Illustrated Treatise on the Maritime Kingdoms, or Haiguo Tuzhi, a gazetteer compiled by scholar-official Wei Yuan and others, based on initial translations ordered by Special Imperial Commissioner Lin Zexu. The Treatise is regarded as the first significant Chinese work on the West
