= 1842 in China =

- Decades: 1820s; 1830s; 1840s; 1850s; 1860s
- See also: Other events of 1842; History of China • Timeline • Years

Events from the year 1842 in China.

== Incumbents ==
- Daoguang Emperor (22nd year)

=== Viceroys ===
- Viceroy of Zhili — Nergingge
- Viceroy of Min-Zhe —
- Viceroy of Huguang —
- Viceroy of Shaan-Gan — ?
- Viceroy of Liangguang —
- Viceroy of Yun-Gui —
- Viceroy of Sichuan —
- Viceroy of Liangjiang —

== Events ==
=== Ongoing ===
- First Opium War
  - February 1842 — the Nemesis saw action at Taisam in, in a successful skirmish associated with repulse of a much larger Chinese attack on Ningbo.
  - In the spring of 1842 the Daoguang Emperor ordered his cousin Yijing to retake the city of Ningpo. In the ensuing Battle of Ningpo on 10 March the British garrison repelled the assault with rifle fire and naval artillery. At Ningpo the British lured the Qing army into the city streets before opening fire, resulting in heavy Chinese casualties.
  - 15 March — The British pursued the retreating Chinese army, capturing the nearby city of Cixi
  - 29 August — The First Opium war officially ends with the signing of the Treaty of Nanking.

== Births ==
- Wu Tingfang (伍廷芳, also known as Ng Choy or Ng Achoy[1] (伍才; Wǔ Cái); 30 July 1842 – 23 June 1922) was a Straits Settlements-born Chinese diplomat and politician who served as Minister of Foreign Affairs and briefly as Acting Premier during the early years of the Republic of China.
