= Yuanwailang =

Qing dynasty government position

- Traditional Chinese: 員外郎
- Simplified Chinese: 员外郎
Transcriptions
Standard Mandarin
- Hanyu Pinyin: Yuán wàiláng

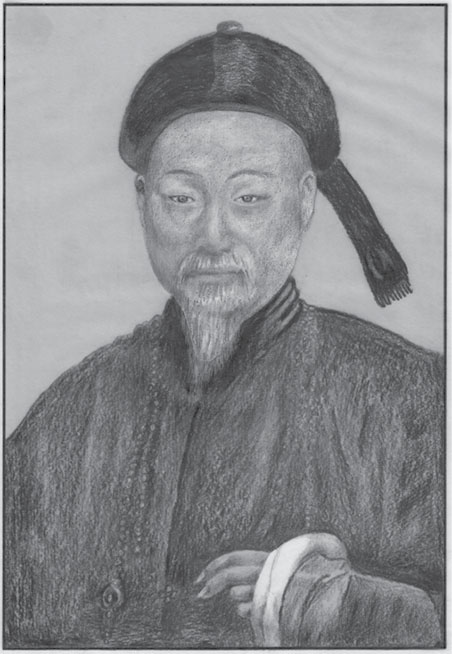
Qishan, a famous Qing official who served as Yuanwailang in the 19th century

The Yuanwailang, meaning an official outside the regular roster, was a standard, official governmental post in the late Qing Dynasty of China. The Yuanwailang served as a vice-head position at the departmental level within each of the Three Departments and Six Ministries, with the position's primary duties within the government being to assist with administrative affairs within the Three Departments and Six Ministries. The Yuanwailang was famously perceived as a stepping stone in the Qing government to a higher, more advanced rank.

== Responsibilities ==
Within the Qing nine-rank ranking system, the position of Yuanwailang was officially ranked as 5b. This was a mid-level position, placing them below the heads of a ministry (the ministers) and department heads (Langzhong), but above a junior officer like the Zhushi (assistant department head). The position of Yuanwailang, despite being a formal rank, was extremely flexible and was treated differently depending on the context.

As the deputy to the head of the department, a Yuanwailang was primarily responsible for assisting in the administrative affairs of the Three Departments and Six Ministries. Each ministry was divided into departments, and each department had one Yuanwailang who served as the deputy to the Langzhong, meaning head of department. Examples of assistance typically included assignments and tasks like handling official documents, supervising subordinate staff, and managing the specific portfolio of their respective department, the Ministry of Personnel, the Yuanwailang was responsible for appointing personnel to different areas of the dynasty, the Ministry of Revenue, the Yuanwailang were responsible for collecting taxes, and the Ministry of Justice, the Yuanwailang were responsible for doing judicial reviews.

== Appointment Mechanisms ==
There two primary techniques to acquire the position of Yuanwailang in the Qing government. The first of which was through acquiring a Jinshi degree in the Imperial examination, while the second of which involved a common practice in the Qing Dynasty known as the "yinxu" system, which allowed individuals to purchase official titles. Merchants or gentry could donate 8,000 taels of silver to obtain the position of Yuanwailang. This position was in this context often an honorary post, conferring status without requiring substantive official duties.

== Abolition ==
The Yuanwailang position was abolished in the 1910s following the fall of the Qing Dynasty and the establishment of the Republic of China.
