= The Chinese Union =

The Chinese Union (Chinese: 福漢會) was an early Chinese Protestant Christian missionary society that was involved in preaching to Chinese and sending Chinese workers to Mainland China during the late Qing Dynasty. It was founded by Karl Gützlaff in 1844, Hong Kong. Some leaders of Taiping Rebellion were members of this society. The society disbanded after 1855.
