= Deng Tingzhen =

Governor-General of Liangguang

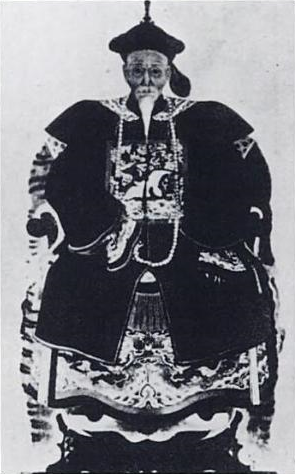
Viceroy Deng Tingzhen

Deng Tingzhen (Chinese: 鄧廷楨; pinyin: Dèng Tíngzhēn; Wade–Giles: Teng T'ing-chen; 25 January 1776 – 15 April 1846) was a Chinese politician who served as the governor-general of Liangguang (Guangdong and Guangxi) from early 1836 until early 1840.

In 1836, Deng expressed his approval for a memorial by his fellow official Xu Naiji recommending opium be legalized in China. However, in 1837, under orders from the Daoguang Emperor, he led a crackdown on the Canton opium trade (although remaining personally in favour of decriminalization). By the beginning of 1839, Deng’s crackdown had led to the near-collapse of the opium trade in the region.

Deng notably co-wrote the 1839 Letter to Queen Victoria with Lin Zexu, which sparked the beginning of the First Opium War. Along with Lin, he was sentenced to exile in the far western reaches of the empire by the Daoguang Emperor for his role in causing the conflict.

Government offices
Preceded by Lu Kun	Viceroy of Liangguang; 1836─1840	Succeeded by Lin Zexu
