= Bichang (official) =

Qing dynasty official

Bichang (Chinese: 壁昌 or 璧昌, died 1854) of the Mongol Eledete clan, courtesy name Dongyuan (東垣) and art name Xingquan (星泉), was a Qing dynasty official who served first in high-ranking posts in Xinjiang and later as Viceroy of Liangjiang under the Daoguang Emperor. He was also a writer, an accomplished poet, and a painter. His posthumous name was Qinxiang (勤襄).

He was an ethnic Mongol of the Bordered Yellow Banner; both his father Heying and his son Hengfu were also important Qing officials.

== Early career ==
The son of minister Heying, Bichang began his civil service career as a clerk (bithesi) in the Ministry of Works. He then served as the county magistrate first in Yangwu County (now Yuanyang County, Henan) and later in Zaoqiang County. He was subsequently promoted and became the prefect of Daming Prefecture.

== Northwest China ==
In 1827, Bichang was dispatched to Southern Xinjiang with Nayancheng, the Viceroy of Zhili, following the defeat of Jahangir Khoja. His father Heying served there many years before, and Bichang was likely familiar with the area and its administration. In 1829, he was promoted to Top-Grade Imperial Guard (頭等侍衛) and Grand Minister Superintendent of Yarkant (葉爾羌辦事大臣). In 1830, Bichang successfully defended Yarkant during the Āfāqī Khoja Holy War. He later detailed his experiences in Shoubian Jiyao and Ye'erqiang Shoucheng Jilüe. In these works, Bichang stressed the importance of unity between the Hui Muslims and Han Chinese, which was achieved through propaganda by imams and Begs. He also talked about the unreliability of Kyrgyz allies and how he involved the Uyghur people in his army. Also critical to his success were careful fortification and monitoring, the tuntian system, moving markets to the inside of the cities, and the acquisition of all necessary weaponry and equipments.

In 1831, he became the Grand Minister Consultant of Kashgar (喀什噶爾參贊大臣), and later that year, the Grand Minister Consultant of Yarkant. He was recalled to Beijing in late 1832. In 1834, he became the Grand Minister Superintendent of Uqturpan. A few months later, he went to Liangzhou Prefecture (in Gansu) to serve as its Deputy Commander-in-Chief. He returned to Xinjiang in 1837, as Grand Minister Superintendent of Aksu. After a brief stint as Commander-in-Chief of Chahar, he became the Grand Minister Consultant of Ili in 1840, and the Governor of Shaanxi (陝西巡撫) in 1842.

== Southeast China, retirement, and death ==
In November 1842, he was sent to Fuzhou to serve as its Commander; two years later he became the Viceroy of Liangjiang, which he officially assumed in January 1845. He returned to Beijing in March 1847 and was appointed Grand Minister of the Imperial Household Department (内大臣) a month later. He returned to Fuzhou and stayed there until early 1849, when he retired to his banner due to an illness.

In 1853, as Taiping rebel's Northern Expedition approached Beijing, Bichang was appointed Grand Minister Inspector (巡防大臣) but he died a year later.

== Bibliography ==
- Ye'erqiang Shoucheng Jilüe (葉爾羌守城紀略; "A Brief Account of Defending Cities in Yarkant", 1838)
- Shoubian Jiyao (守邊輯要; "A Summary of Guardding the Frontier", 1831), published in 1840 with sections added by his successor Ling Xiufeng (齡秀峰)
- Bingwu Jianwenlu (兵武見聞錄; "A Personal Account of the Military")
- Muling Yaojue (牧令要訣; "A Manual for Magistrates")
- Bi Qinxiang Gong Yishu (壁勤襄公遺書; "Posthumous Writings by Bichang, Lord Qinxiang")

Bichang's poetry collection, published as Bi Canshuai Shigao (壁參帥詩稿, "Poems by Bichang, the Consultant-Marshall") is now considered lost, but some of his poems on paintings have survived. He was also a known painter and could draw architectural diagrams.
