= Qishan (official) =

Mongol nobleman and Chinese official (1786–1854)

Hereditary First Class Marquis Qishan
- 琦善
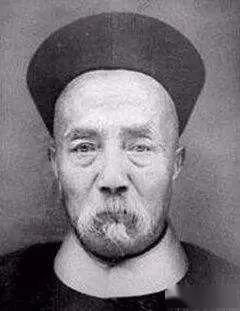
- Official portrait, 1852

Imperial Commissioner of the Qing
- In office 3 October 1840 – 26 February 1841
- Monarch: Daoguang Emperor
- Preceded by: Lin Zexu
- Succeeded by: Yishan
- In office 25 December 1852 – 3 August 1854
- Monarch: Xianfeng Emperor
- Preceded by: Ye Mingchen
- Succeeded by: Xiang Rong

Yuanwailang
- In office 20 August 1806 – 22 July 1808
- Monarch: Jiaqing Emperor

Imperial Bodyguard of the Jiaqing Emperor
- In office 22 July 1808 – 31 May 1814
- Monarch: Jiaqing Emperor

Vice-commander of the Plain Yellow Banner
- In office 31 May 1814 – 18 August 1817
- Monarch: Jiaqing Emperor

Junior Vice-President of the Court of Colonial Affairs
- In office 18 August 1817 – 3 October 1819
- Monarch: Jiaqing Emperor

Provincial governor of Henan province
- In office 3 October 1819 – 16 May 1821
- Monarchs: Jiaqing Emperor; Daoguang Emperor

Financial Commissioner of Jiangsu
- In office 16 May 1821 – 15 May 1825
- Monarch: Daoguang Emperor

Viceroy of Liangjiang
- In office 7 July 1825 – 5 June 1827
- Monarch: Daoguang Emperor
- Preceded by: Wei Yuan
- Succeeded by: Jiang Youxian

Viceroy of Sichuan
- In office 2 April 1829 – 25 March 1831
- Monarch: Daoguang Emperor
- Preceded by: Dai Sanxi
- Succeeded by: Ošan
- In office 22 April 1847 – 19 April 1849
- Monarch: Daoguang Emperor
- Preceded by: Baoxing
- Succeeded by: Yucheng

Viceroy of Zhili
- In office 25 March 1831 – 28 September 1840
- Monarch: Daoguang Emperor
- Preceded by: Mujangga
- Succeeded by: Nergingge

Viceroy of Liangguang
- In office 3 October 1840 – 26 February 1841
- Monarch: Daoguang Emperor
- Preceded by: Lin Zexu
- Succeeded by: Yishan

Imperial Resident in Tibet
- In office 16 October 1843 – 22 April 1847
- Monarch: Daoguang Emperor
- Preceded by: Mengbao
- Succeeded by: Ruiyuan

Viceroy of Shaan-Gan
- In office 19 April 1849 – 14 May 1851
- Monarchs: Daoguang Emperor; Xianfeng Emperor
- Preceded by: Buyantai
- Succeeded by: Yutai

Personal details
- Born: 18 January 1786 Beijing
- Died: 3 August 1854 (aged 68) Yangzhou
- Relations: Chengde (father)
- Education: Beijing banner school
- Occupation: Politician
- Posthumous name: Wenqin (文勤)
- Known for: Negotiating the Convention of Chuenpi

Military service
- Allegiance: Qing Dynasty
- Branch/service: Manchu Banner Army
- Years of service: 1806 - 1854
- Rank: Imperial Commissioner; Viceroy of Liangguang; Commander of the Jiangbei Camp
- Battles/wars: First Opium War: Battle of Canton; Second Battle of Chuenpi; Battle of the Bogue; Taiping Rebellion: Northern Expedition

Qishan
- Chinese: 琦善
Transcriptions
Standard Mandarin
- Hanyu Pinyin: Qíshàn
- Wade–Giles: Chi-shan

Jing'an
- Traditional Chinese: 靜庵
- Simplified Chinese: 静庵
Transcriptions
Standard Mandarin
- Hanyu Pinyin: Jìng'ān

Qishan, First Class Marquis (Note: The British referred to him as "Keshen". Later usage was "Ch'i Shan" and the pinyin is "Qíshàn".) (Manchu: ᡴᡳᡧᠠᠨ, Möllendorff: Kišan, Abkai: Kixan; 18 January 1786 – 3 August 1854), courtesy name Jing'an, was a Mongol nobleman and official of the late Qing dynasty. He was of Khalkha Mongol and Borjigit descent, his family was under the Plain Yellow Banner of the Manchu Eight Banners, and he lived during the reign of the Qianlong, Jiaqing, Daoguang, and Xianfeng emperors. He served as the Imperial Commissioner of the Qing Dynasty, the second highest-ranking position in the Qing government only below that of emperor, twice. He served in the First Opium War and Taiping Rebellion and famously negotiated and signed the Convention of Chuenpi with British plenipotentiary Charles Elliot, which ceded Hong Kong Island to the British. He, alongside Li Hongzhang, Keying, Elliot, and Henry Pottinger, are considered the founding fathers of modern Hong Kong, making them extremely famous in the city.

Qishan was born in Beijing on 18 January 1786. His early career include obtaining the position of a Yinsheng in the Imperial Examination and entering the Qing bureaucracy in 1806, at the age of 20. He was part of the Jiaqing Emperor's bodyguard force from 1808 to 1814, and served as Vice-commander of the Mongol Plain Yellow Banner from 1814 to 1817, Junior Vice-president of the Court of Colonial Affairs from 1817 to 1819, Provincial governor of Henan province from 1819 to 1821, and Financial Commissioner of Jiangsu from 1821 to 1825. He also served as the Governor-General of Liangjiang, one of the richest regions in the Qing Dynasty, from 1825 to 1827. From 1831 to 1840, Qishan governed Zhili, the province surrounding the Qing capital, Beijing.

In 1840, Qishan was selected to succeed Lin Zexu as the Qing Dynasty's Imperial Commissioner. After successful negotiations in the Hai River and in Guangzhou, Qishan and British Superintendent of Trade in China, Charles Elliot, drafted and signed the Convention of Chuenpi, which demanded the Qing cede Hong Kong Island, pay an indemnity of 6 million silver ingots to compensate for the opium destroyed in 1838, and to reopen Guangzhou for opium trade by February 1841. When Qishan was discovered to have drafted and signed this convention, the Daoguang Emperor was infuriated, leading to Qishan's arrest and stripping of his ranks. He was reinstated as an official in 1842, and was appointed terms as the Viceroy of Tibet in 1843, Sichuan in 1846, and Shaan-Gan (Shaanxi and Gansu) in 1849. In 1852, he was once again appointed as Imperial Commissioner of the Qing to stop the Taiping Rebellion, which resulted in a failure. Qishan died in the summer of 1854.

== Ancestry ==
Qishan was part of the Borjigit (博尔济吉特氏; Bó'ěrjìjítè shì) clan and he and his family belonged to the Plain Yellow Banner (正黄旗; Xiāng Huáng Qí) of the Eight Banners of the Qing Dynasty. The Borjigit clan was seen as one of the most prestigious and powerful lineages of Inner Asia, as it was the clan of infamous Mongol leader Genghis Khan. Qishan's Borjigit clan was incorporated into the Qing Dynasty through a strategic alliance between the Mongols and the Manchu people. During the rise of the Manchus under Nurhaci and Hong Taiji, the first and second emperors of the Later Jin Empire in the early 17th century, forming alliances with Mongol tribes was a strategic imperative to avoid a two-front war against the Ming dynasty and the Mongols. The Manchu Aisin Gioro clan actively intermarried with Qishan's Borjigit nobility to secure this alliance.

According to the Secret History of the Mongols, the first Mongol was born from the union of a blue-grey wolf and a fallow doe. Their 11th generation descendent, Alan Gua, was impregnated by a ray of light and gave birth to five sons, the youngest being Bodonchar Munkhag, progenitor of the Borjigids. According to Rashid al-Din Hamadani, many of the older Mongolian tribes were founded by members of the Borjigin clan, including the Barlas, Urud, Manghud, Taichiud, Chonos, and Kiyat. Bodonchar's descendant Khabul Khan founded the Khamag Mongol confederation around 1131. His great-grandson Temüjin ruled the Khamag Mongol and unified the other Mongol tribes under him. He was declared Genghis Khan in 1206, thus establishing the Mongol Empire. His descendants are the Chinggisids.

The etymology of the word Borjigin is uncertain. Members of the Borjigin clan ruled over the Mongol Empire, dominating large lands stretching from Java to Iran and from Mainland Southeast Asia to Veliky Novgorod. Many of the ruling dynasties that took power following the disintegration of the Mongol Empire were of Chinggisid, and thus Borjigid, ancestry. These included the Chobanids, the Jalayirid Sultanate, the Barlas, the Manghud, the Khongirad, and the Oirats. In 1368, the Borjigid Yuan dynasty of China was overthrown by the Ming dynasty. Members of this family continued to rule over north China and the Mongolian Plateau into the 17th century as the Northern Yuan. Descendants of Genghis Khan's brothers Qasar and Belgutei surrendered to the Ming in the 1380s. By 1470, the Borjigids' power had been severely weakened, and the Mongolian Plateau was on the verge of chaos.

The Borjigit Clan was split into branches, and Qishan's specific branch was from the Jasaghtu Khan of the Khorchin Mongols, who were among the first to submit to the Qing and form marriage alliances with the Aisin Gioro house. After intermarrying with the Aisin-Gioro house and successfully annexing Mongolia, Qishan's family was incorporated into the Plain Yellow Banner, which was part of the "Upper Three Banners" of the Qing Dynasty, as they were directly under the command of the Emperor.

Official banner of the Plain Yellow Banner.

Qishan's 7th generation ancestor Enggeder had led his followers to submit to the Qing Dynasty and received a hereditary first class marquis peerage in return. Qishan inherited the peerage from his ancestor. Qishan's great-great-grandfather, Céng Shùn (成顺 / 常绶), held the title of Fuguo Gong (辅国公, Duke of the Third Order), which was a high-ranking noble title in the Qing Dynasty. Qishan's great-grandfather and grandfather, Fùjíng (富景 / 傅景) and Bǐngshù (炳舒 / 炳绶), served as a high-ranking military commanders. Qishan's father, Yùlín (裕麟), held the position of Fengche Duwei (奉车都尉), a prestigious title involving close proximity to the Emperor (who, at the time, was the Qianlong Emperor).

== Early life ==
Location of the Beijing Inner City in the Qing dynasty.

Qishan was born in Beijing on 18 January 1786, and he was a Khalkha Mongol by birth. He was from the Borjigit clan. Qishan's primary education was conducted through the Qing Banner System, which involved fluency in Manchu and high proficiency in Mandarin Chinese. He was also schooled in the principles of statecraft, law, and the complex administrative machinery of the Qing government. He lived in a multi-courtyard compound in the Banner Garrison Area of Beijing's Inner City, and also studied horsemanship and archery.

In his early career, Qishan also had a Yin privilege, a system of where sons of high-ranking Qing officials were granted official titles or direct access to government posts by virtue of their father's status and service, as Qishan was a young nobleman and part of a banner. This also meant that Qishan did not need to take the standard Civil Service examination, and instead needed to take the Imperial examination.

== Career ==
=== Qing bureaucracy and successes (1806–1840) ===
In 1806, aged 20, Qishan obtained the position of a yinsheng (蔭生) in the entry-level imperial examination, meaning he did not need to take the imperial examination to enter the Qing bureaucracy due to his Yin privilege. His first official appointment in the bureaucracy was as a Yuanwailang (員外郎;assistant director) in the Ministry of Justice. The Yuanwailang was a rank 5b position in the Qing bureaucracy, and its role was a section head or deputy director. He would have been responsible for assisting in the review of legal cases, managing documents, and overseeing clerks. For a young man in his early twenties, this was a very high starting point.

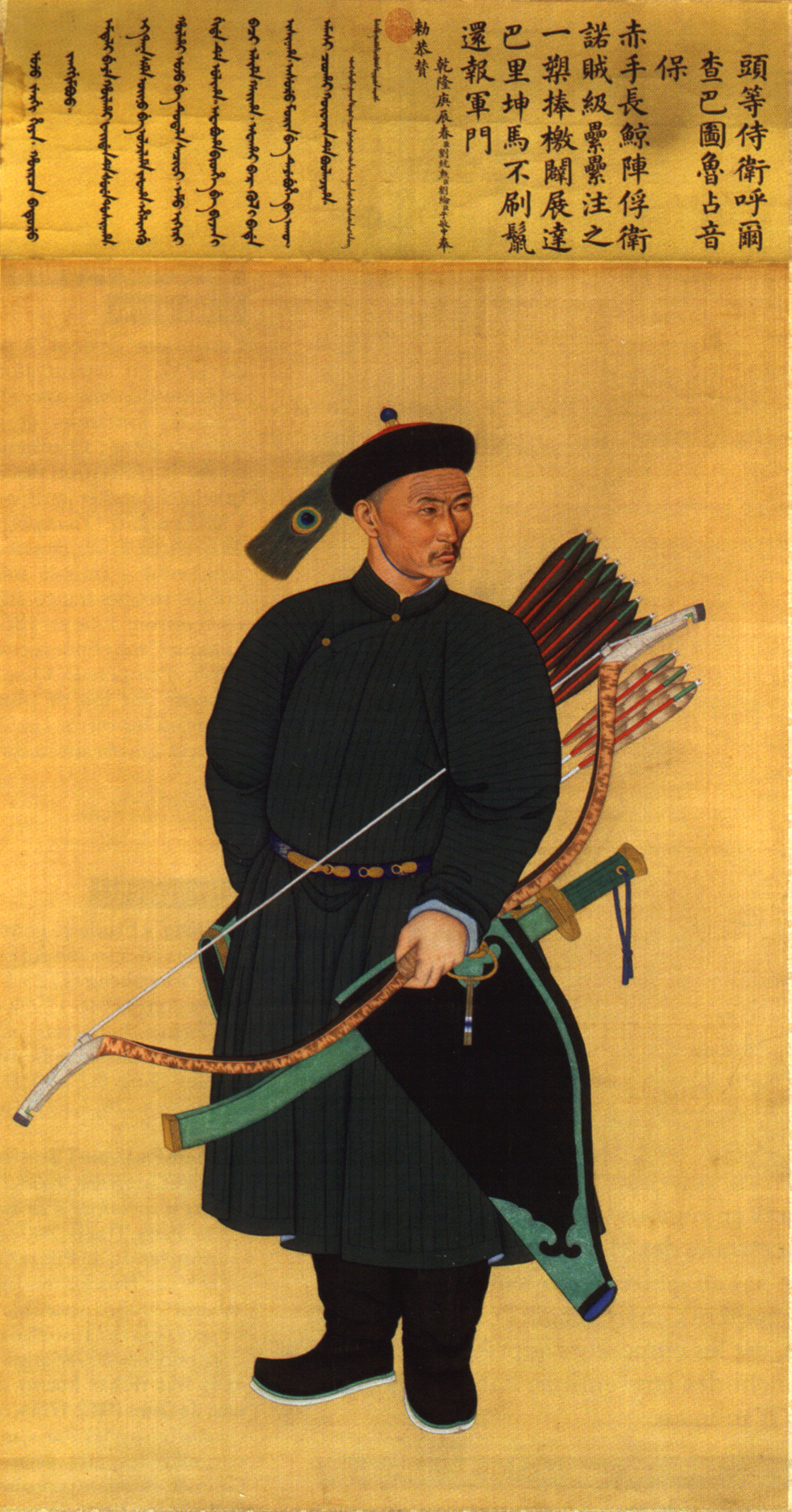
An Imperial bodyguard from the late 1700s.

In 1808, Qishan was selected as a junior officer (延勤侍) of the elite Imperial Bodyguard. The selection operated as a strategic promotion, as service in the Imperial Bodyguard granted Qishan direct communication with the Jiaqing Emperor, the Qing emperor at the time, and a position in the Imperial Bodyguard was reserved for the most trusted future officials, and it signaled that Qishan was marked for high office. Being part of the Imperial Bodyguard meant he was responsible for the personal security of the Emperor and the inner precincts of the Forbidden City. His routine duties included taking part in the highly ritualized guard rotations at the gates and halls of the Forbidden City and accompanying the Jiaqing Emperor at all times inside the palace, even during imperial processions and ceremonies. Being part of the Imperial Bodyguard also allowed Qishan the role as a political apprentice. They overheard state discussions, learned court protocol and politics firsthand, and connected with other elite scions, senior officials, and eunuchs. From 1809 to 1813, He was intermittently promoted to higher ranks within the Bodyguard, such as Yizheng Dachen (議政大臣).

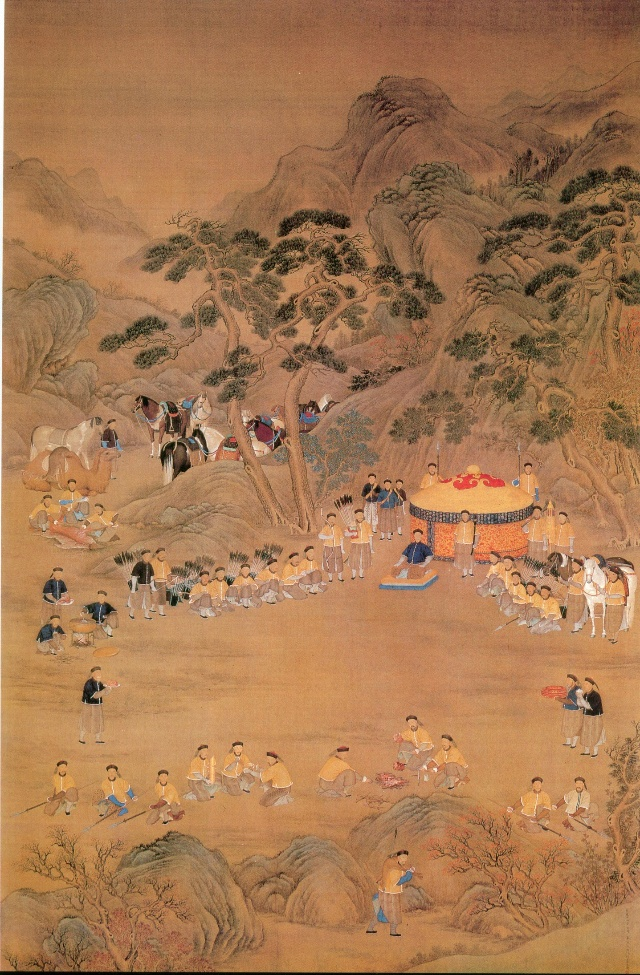
A portrait of the Mulan Autumn Hunt.

In 1814, Qishan left the Imperial Bodyguard, and this action was followed by an immediate appointment to a substantive mid-to-high-level civil or military post. When Qishan shifted back to the Qing bureaucracy, he was appointed Vice-commander of the Mongol Plain Yellow Banner, where he managed Manchu-Mongol affairs. Around this time, the Qing Dynasty also began to decline, so Qishan was heavily relied on for Stipend and Welfare Management in the Plain Yellow Banner. This included accurate registrations of banner households, and a managed distribution of silver, rice, and land. Corruption and fraudulent claims were also persistent problems throughout Qishan's term as Vice-commander. To battle the corruption and fraud, Qishan oversaw and directed increasingly ritualised training in archery, horsemanship, and firearms. Qishan was also permitted to adjudicate disputes and crimes among Banner members. He was also in charge of organising the banner's contingent for the Qing Dynasty's Mulan Autumn Hunt, a Qing event hosted annually since 1683 by the Kangxi Emperor that revolved around a month of hunting for wild animals. From 1814 to 1817, the Jiaqing Restoration also took place, which was a period where the Jiaqing Emperor, alongside high-ranking Qing officials, attempted to eliminate all corruption and political decay, suppress internal rebellions which negatively impacted the Qing Dynasty's finances, curb the smuggling of opium, and prosecute the Minister of Finance of the Qing Dynasty, Heshen, who was described as one of the most corrupt officials in Chinese History, stealing over 1 billion dollars worth of silver (approx. US$270 million). Qishan, being one of the Jiaqing Emperor's trusted officials, Qishan initiated an anti-corruption rectification campaign, by purging "ghost soldiers" (空额 kōng'é) from banner rolls, who were individuals from his banner that had stolen land. Qishan also administered loans to impoverished banner families to combat the Qing's banner poverty and debt issues. Furthermore, he enforced laws to forbid Han Martial Bannermen and Mongols from marrying Han civilians.

In 1817, he was appointed as the Junior Vice-president of the Court of Colonial Affairs, also known as the Lifan Yuan, which was responsible for managing Qing relations with provinces Outer Mongolia, Tibet, Xinjiang, and later, Qinghai. Qishan's appointment required him to handle everything from noble titles and successions, to legal disputes, trade, tribute, and military affairs in these regions. Officials who received this appointment were limited to only Manchus and Mongols. Due to his Mongol heritage, Qishan prominently oversaw Mongolia, where he reviewed and processed reports from Mongol banners, managed stipends of Mongol princes, adjudicated legal cases from the Mongol jurisdictions, and overseeing trade at Zhangjiakou.

In 1819, he was promoted to xunfu (provincial governor) of Henan Province but was later demoted to zhushi (主事) and put in charge of river works. In 1821, under the new Daoguang Emperor, Qishan was sent to Jiangsu, one of the Qing's richest provinces, as Financial Commissioner (布政使). Aged 35, Qishan would receive first-hand exposure into governing a wealthy, politically sophisticated, and prominently Han Chinese province. His position as financial commissioner was also the second-highest provincial position, only behind the governors or viceroys. During his appointment, he was entitled to tax collection, treasury, and fiscal administration. Due to Jiangsu's financial prosperity within the Qing, any mistakes would result in national consequences, indicating his competent reputation within the Qing. He also managed appointments, promotions, and evaluations of all provincial-level subordinate officials (Zhou and Xian magistrates). Inside Jiangsu province, Qishan predominantly governed the Grand Canal, where resources from nations part of the Qing Tributary System in Southeast Asia was transported to Beijing, and the Jiangnan Region, consisting of Suzhou, Hangzhou, Nanjing, and Shanghai. During his rule, Jiangsu quickly became home to the Qing's highest concentration of scholar-officials, examination degree holders, and powerful landed gentry. His achievements during his appointment included the smooth shipment of resources across the Grand Canal, efficient and effective tax collection, proficient management of the magistrates, and controlling the local bureaucracy in Jiangsu.

In 1825, Qishan was appointed as Governor-General of Liangjiang. This appointment meant he was the Governor-General of Jiangsu, Jiangxi, and Anhui, which was the wealthiest and most strategically important region in China, with the region contributing around one-third of the Qing's entire tax revenue. This appointment came immediately after his term in Jiangsu ended, due to his immense successes. Qishan's routines in this new role was relatively similar to that of his old appointment, like controlling the Grand Canal and the Jiangnan Region. However, it also involved control of the Lower Yangtze River. The Yangtze River and the Huai River notably required constant supervision and maintenance to prevent flooding that could impact the wealthy region of Liangjiang and Beijing. Additionally, Liangjiang was home to the Liang-Huai Salt Zone, an extremely corrupt state of the Qing Dynasty, led by smuggling syndicates. home to the empire's highest concentration of scholar-officials, examination degree holders, and powerful landed gentry.

He also served in more appointments, including Sichuan (1829–1831) and Zhili (1831–1840). Qishan's term as Viceroy of Zhili was extremely important, as he was governing the province surrounding Beijing, the capital. He was required to defend the capital, manage the transportation of goods to Beijing, and manage water conservancy of the Yellow River and Jinghang Waterway. Due to the Yellow River's proneness to flooding, Qishan reinforced dikes.

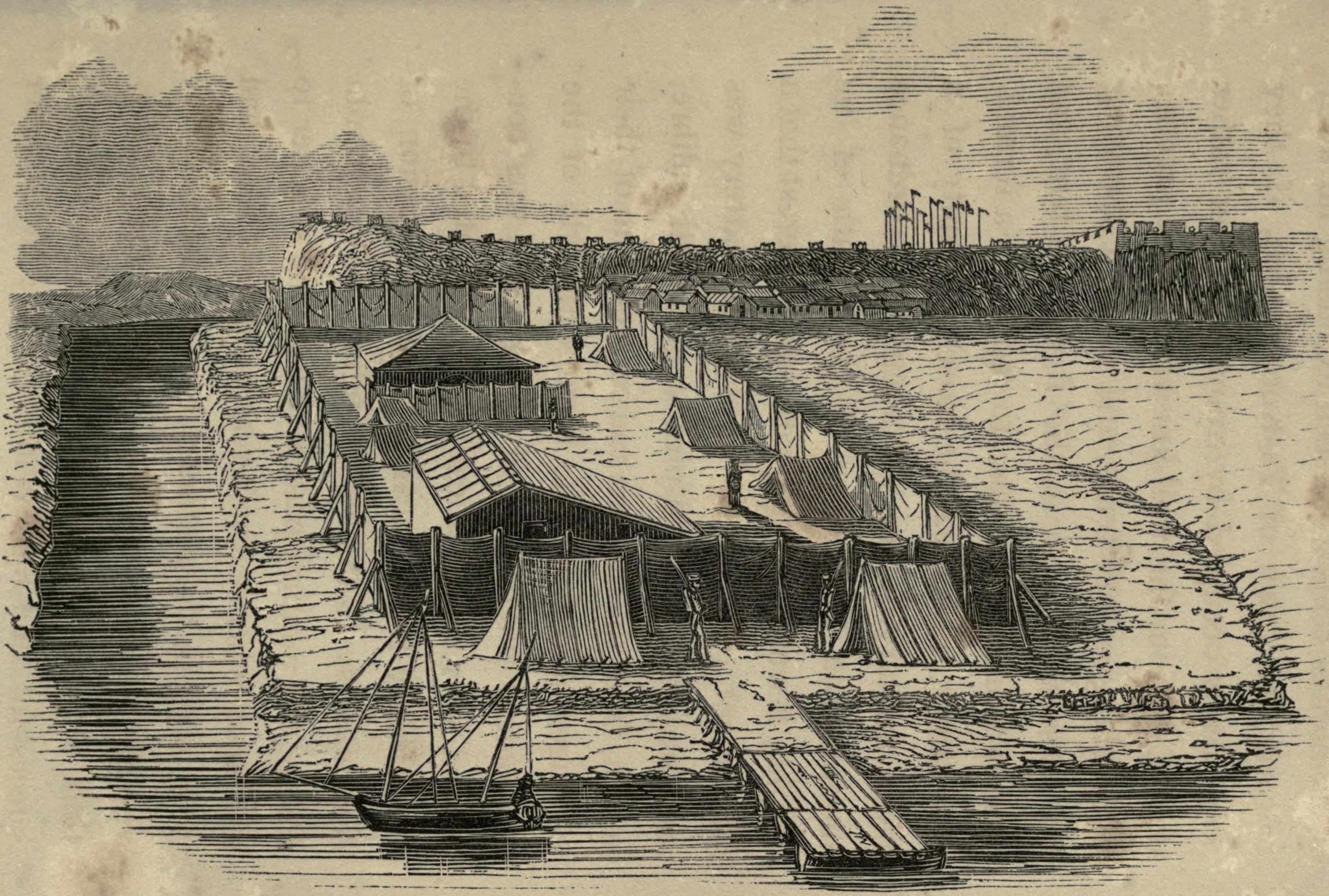
Encampment where Qishan met British Plenipotentiary Charles Elliot for their negotiations for the Convention of Chuenpi.

=== First Opium War (1839–1841) ===
When the First Opium War broke out in 1839, Qishan was chosen by the Daoguang Emperor, the Qing Emperor at the time, to be a military general of the Qing Imperial Army. In 1840, the Daoguang Emperor ordered Qishan to replace Lin Zexu as the acting Viceroy of Liangguang and Imperial Commissioner (covering Guangdong and Guangxi provinces).

In June 1840, Qishan was chosen to represent Qing authorities and the Daoguang Emperor in negotiations with the British Empire's Expeditionary Force, led by Charles Elliot, in Hai River regarding compensation for the opium destroyed by Lin Zexu, as he had been governing Zhili beforehand. Upon witnessing British naval power during negotiations, he ordered his troops to evacuate from the artillery batteries and sent Bao Peng (鮑鵬) to meet the British at Chuenpi (穿鼻; present-day Humen, Guangdong Province) and call for a peace settlement. To convince the expeditionary force to continue negotiations in Chuenpi and in return for the courtesy of the British north division expeditionary forces to withdraw themselves from the Hai River and Yellow Sea, Qishan promised to requisition imperial funds as restitution for British merchants who had suffered damages during Lin Zexu's confiscation of Opium. Arriving in Guangzhou after the negotiations in the Hai River, Qishan gave orders to remove Guan Tianpei's coastal defences by reducing the number of navy soldiers. In Guangzhou (more specifically, Chuenpi), Elliot and Qishan negotiated from June to December, with Elliot writing on 29 December to "request a place in the outer sea, where the British can fly their flag and administer themselves, just as the Westerners do in Portuguese Macau." Furthermore, in the negotiations with Qishan, Elliot wanted $7 million over a period of six years and the surrender of Amoy and Chusan as permanent British possessions. Qishan offered $5 million over twelve years, so they agreed to $6 million. However, Qishan refused Elliot's territorial demands. On 17 December, Elliot countered with an offer to abandon Zhoushan, which the British captured in July 1840, and for another port to be chosen later in its place. After Qishan rejected the offer, Elliot told him, "There are very large forces collected here, and delays must breed amongst them a very great impatience." The year passed with no final settlements. An opium clipper that subsequently sailed into Canton brought with it a rumour that the emperor had decided to wage war. On 5 January 1841, Elliot prepared for an attack on Canton, informing Qishan that an attack would commence in two days if agreement could not be reached. On 7 January 1841, Elliot allowed Commodore Gordon Bremer, commander-in-chief of the British forces, to make offensive operations. In the ensuing Second Battle of Chuenpi, Qing forces lost, forcing Qishan to become somewhat submissive in negotiating with Elliot in the following days, from 7 January 1841 to 19 January 1841.

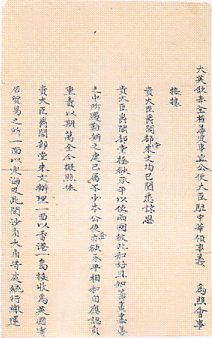
First page of the Convention of Chuenpi

==== Convention of Chuenpi ====
On 20 January 1841 in Chuenpi, without seeking approval from the Qing imperial court, Qishan agreed to the Convention of Chuenpi with Charles Elliot after negotiations. The convention stipulated that the Qing Dynasty would pay the British an indemnity of six million silver coins, cede Hong Kong Island in exchange for the captive Zhoushan Island, there be equal diplomatic relations between the British and Qing, the release of British merchants trapped and held captive by the Qing, and Guangzhou reopening for trade in February 1841. A day after the signing of the convention on 21 January, The forts captured during the Second Battle of Chuenpi were returned to the Qing in a ceremony on Chuenpi, which had been controlled by Captain James Scott as pro tempore governor of the fort. Prior to the ceremony, the forts had been formally returned when Commodore Gordon Bremer, commander-in-chief of British forces in China, sent a letter to Guan Tianpei regarding the return. The British colours were hauled down and the Chinese colours were hoisted in their place, under a salute fired from HMS Wellesley, and returned by the Chinese with a salute fired from the Anunghoy batteries.

On 23 January, Elliot dispatched HMS Columbine to Zhoushan, with instructions to evacuate it for Hong Kong. At the same time, Qishan directed Yilibu, the Viceroy of Liangjiang, to release the British prisoners at Ningbo. News of the terms was sent to England aboard the East India Company steamer Enterprise, which left China on 23 January. On 26 January 1841, Bremer took formal possession of Hong Kong with the naval officers of the squadron at Possession Point, where the Union Jack was raised, under a feu de joie from the Royal Marines and a royal salute from the warships. This date is considered as the modern founding of Hong Kong.

On 27 January, the Daoguang Emperor received a memorial Qishan sent on 8 January, reporting on the British capture of the Bogue forts, still completely oblivious to the signing of the convention or the fact that this battle had already been settled. He instructed Qishan via the Grand Council and Qing Imperial Court as such:

To this display of rebelliousness, the only response can be to suppress them and wipe them out. If they show no reasonableness there is no point in trying to give them orders. You are to lead the commanders and officers and spare no effort in exterminating them, to recover [the lost territory].

The order arrived on 9 February, but Qishan did not change course. In a memorial to the emperor on 14 February, he said he received the order "yesterday" to cover up his continued meetings with Elliot, which had occurred on 27 January and 11–12 February as the two tried to get Queen Victoria to ratify the convention, as the two had agreed to get Queen Victoria to ratify it before the Daoguang Emperor for unknown reasons. During the meeting betweenElliot and Qishan on 11–12 February, A British account described Qishan's demeanour:

There was an appearance of constraint about him, as if his mind was downcast, and his heart burdened and heavy laden. He never indeed for a moment lost his self-possession, or that dignified courtesy of manner which no people can better assume than the Chinese of rank; but there was still something undefinable in his bearing, which impressed upon all present the conviction that something untoward had happened.

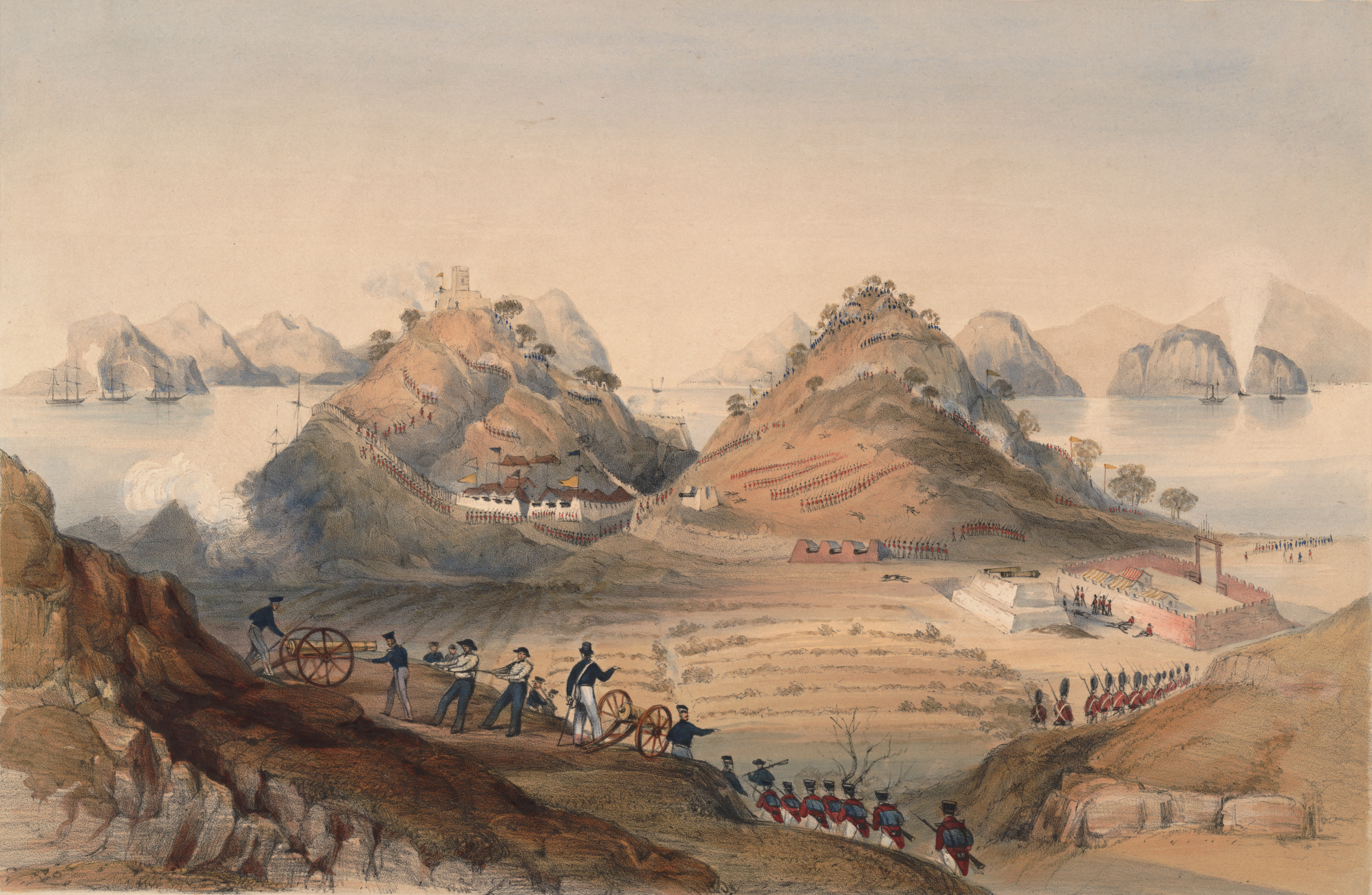
British forces storming Chuenpi during the Second Battle of Chuenpi

On 13 February, a letter from Elliot was sent to Qishan requesting to meet promptly. A letter was dispatched to London aboard the Nemesis ship to receive written ratification of the convention from Queen Victoria. On 19 February, the ship returned without any reply, greatly upsetting Elliot The same day, Qishan informed Elliot that he had sent a letter to the Daoguang Emperor regarding the convention, not knowing that Queen Victoria had refused to ratify the treaty and that the ship had returned empty-handed. The letter covered four main points for the emperor:

- The forts – Located on small islands and having channels in the rear, foreign ships could easily blockade them and starve out the defenders. Canton can also be reached from other channels, not just the same route followed during peace time.
- The guns – Inadequate in number, with many obsolete and not in working order. They are placed at the front of the forts, leaving the sides undefended.
- The troops – The soldiers being used as marines are unused to ships and those normally employed for patrol duty are sometimes of poor quality.
- The Cantonese people – Even putting aside those considered "traitors", they have generally become so used to the foreigners that they no longer regard them as vastly different people and often get along with them. A small present such as a mechanical contrivance is enough to win over most of the people.

However, Elliot responded that fair means had been exhausted. the British recaptured the Bogue forts on 23–26 February, which allowed them to proceed towards Guangzhou to force the opening of trade. On 26 February, Qishan awoke to a document awaiting him. It was an edict from the Daoguang Emperor sent on 16 February, which stated that a large army would be sent to Guangzhou and that Yishan had been appointed as the new Imperial Commissioner, with Yang Fang as military commander alongside Yilibu and Guan Tianpei who were already present at Guangzhou, and Longwen as an assistant regional commander. The edict was a response to Qishan's 13 February letter. The Daoguang Emperor ordered Qishan to be arrested and escorted as a criminal to Beijing for trial. Qishan was officially dismissed from his role as Imperial Commissioner on 26 February 1841, and returned to Beijing on 12 March 1841. En route, Qishan met with reformist thinker Wei Yuan, with whom he shared his testimonials in the war with. His testimonials directly contributed to Wei's publication of the Illustrated Treatise on the Maritime Kingdoms. Nonetheless, Qishan had his properties and assets confiscated and was sentenced to military service as a result.

=== Reinstatement and political redemption (1842–1851) ===
Qishan was pardoned later and reinstated as an official in 1842. To regain the trust of the Qing Imperial court, Qishan was appointed as an Imperial Resident in Tibet from 1843 to 1847. During his term as an Imperial resident of Tibet, the British East India Company expressed interest in opening trade with Tibet and solving border disputes between the Qing, Sikkim, and Bhutan, which presented itself as a threat. Qishan also viewed the Sikh Empire as a threat towards Tibet's western frontiers. As a result, Qishan accused a Tibetan official, Doring Pandita, of conspiring with the Nepalese court without the knowledge or permission of Qishan or the Daoguang Emperor. Qishan then arrested, tried, and imprisoned Pandita and his associates in 1845.

Throughout his term, Qishan also remained strict and vigilant towards the British, brought on from his failed experiences in the First Opium War. He reinforced border defences towards the south, where the British East India Company was located, and refused British trade attempts. After his term in Tibet ended in 1847, he was appointed a second term as Viceroy of Sichuan (1846–1849). Sichuan was infamously filled with bandits, and its topographically diverse environment made it difficult for Qing authorities to traverse and enforce control on the province. Sichuan was also heavily impacted by the Qing Dynasty's decline in the 19th century, which allowed for smaller protests similar to the White Lotus Rebellion to surface in the province. This showed that Sichuan was a very unstable province at the time. As the Viceroy, Qishan deployed Green Standard Army troops to rat out bandits.

Official Flag of the Green Standard Army

In 1847, a rebellion took place in Sichuan led by a man named Li Yuanfa. The rebellion's motives and ideologies were similar to those of the White Lotus Rebellion. Qishan acted decisively, mobilizing forces to besiege and crush the rebellion in Guang'an and surrounding areas. The suppression was swift and ruthless, resulting in the execution of the rebel leaders and the dispersal of their followers. After his term as Viceroy of Sichuan ended, he was appointed as Viceroy of Shaan-Gan from 1849 to 1851.

As Viceroy of Shaan-Gan, Qishan was tasked with governing the Shaanxi and Gansu provinces. At the time, the Shaan-Gan region had many issues, ranging from ethnic and religious diversity (especially in Gansu) due to the presence of Muslims, Han Chinese, Tibetans, and Mongols coexisting, history of conflict, and economic hardship (due to proneness to famine). Qishan was appointed as Viceroy to resolve such issues, as it was a vital land corridor connecting China proper to Central Asia (Xinjiang), making the maintenance of the "Gansu Corridor" important for imperial control.

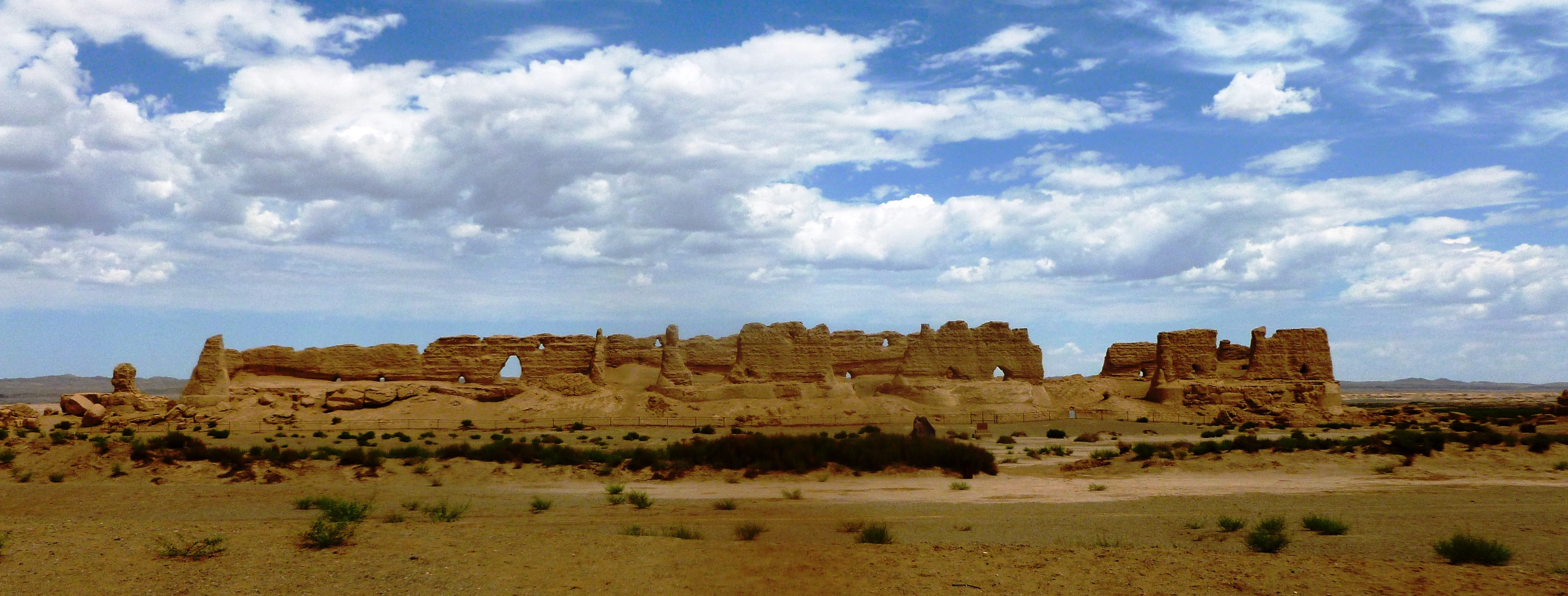
Han dynasty granary on Silk Road west of Gansu, China

Qishan's approach was relatively similar to his past approaches in Tibet and Sichuan, where he used overwhelming military force to suppress protests, uprisings, and rebellions. During his tenure, there were several localized uprisings and "bandit" activities, often with sectarian undertones, which he dealt with promptly using this tactic. Additionally, he oversaw the Green Standard Army garrisons in the region, ensuring they were equipped and ready to respond to threats. However, managing the provinces' economic issues was significantly more difficult. One of Qishan's strategies was to manage the granary system, which would help with the provinces' economy and prevent famines. By 1851, the Qing Imperial court considered Qishan's governing of Tibet, Sichuan, and Shaan-Gan to be massively successful.

=== Taiping Rebellion and death (1852–1854) ===
In the summer of 1852, Qishan was appointed once again as the Imperial Commissioner and a commander of Qing forces by the new Xianfeng Emperor, who had inherited the throne only two years prior due to the Daoguang Emperor's death. Realising the inadequacy of the Qing's existing commanders and recognising Qishan's successes in governing provinces, the Xianfeng Emperor appointed Qishan as Imperial Commissioner and commander mainly to battle the Taiping Heavenly Kingdom of the Taiping Rebellion, the deadliest Civil war since the Ming-Qing Transition.

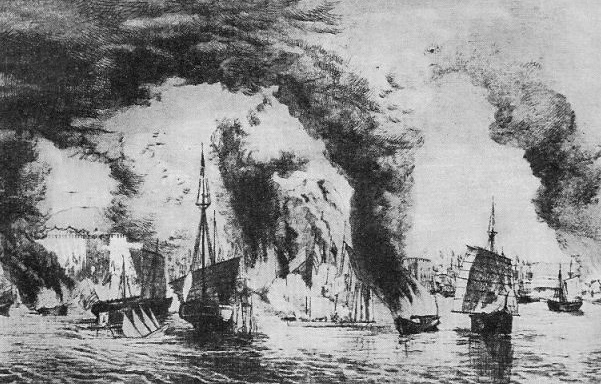
Drawing of a naval battle between the Taiping Heavenly Kingdom and the Qing Dynasty

To begin the defensive, Qishan bolstered defences in Henan to prevent any move north from the Taiping forces, which had already captured the Nanjing region, and had placed their capital in Nanjing (renamed Tianjing). Qishan then established one of the two camps used to besiege Taiping forces in Nanjing, named the "Jiangbei Camp" (江北大營) on the northern bank of the Yangtze River at Yangzhou. Qishan's army, which resided in the camp, was named the Jiangnan Daying and consisted of 18,000 Green Standard Army infantry soldiers. As commander of the Jiangbei Camp, Qishan was tasked to apply constant pressure on the Taiping-controlled Nanjing.

Having experienced British military strength a decade prior, Qishan prioritised well-organised attacks over immediate attacks. Because of this, Qishan's tactic was to cut off Nanjing supply routes and starve the Taiping forces to death. However, this "slow" approach sparked tensions between Qishan, the Xianfeng Emperor, and Xiang Rong, another Qing general. The Xianfeng Emperor criticised Qishan for his "sluggish" approach, and urged him to launch an immediate attack to recapture Nanjing. Furthermore, Qishan's troops were also unable to recapture Zhenjiang, a city that had been besieged by Taiping forces.

In May 1853, the Taiping forces launched the Northern Expedition, a long march headed directly towards Beijing. The march broke through Qishan's siege, and he was heavily criticised for his failed efforts. His forces at the camp remained locked in a stalemate with the Taiping defenders, meaning he could not prevent sorties from the city nor could he mount a successful assault. From Summer to Autumn of 1853, Northern Expedition forces navigated Anhui, Henan, and began travelling into Shanxi, threatening Beijing. Panicked, the Xianfeng Emperor demanded Qishan break the siege and launch an attack on Nanjing. Under immense pressure, Qishan launches multiple attacks around Nanjing, but all result in devastating defeats. In early 1854, Taiping Western Expeditionary forces threaten the Middle Yangtze Region. Despite attempting to use a different and more structured military strategy compared to the one he had used against the British a decade earlier which had failed, this strategy too resulted in a failure.

Qishan died on 3 August 1854, aged 68, in camp due to illness from physical exhaustion, and immense distress. The Qing government granted him the posthumous name "Wenqin" (文勤). He was buried in his family cemetery.

== Reputation and criticisms ==
=== Qing Government ===
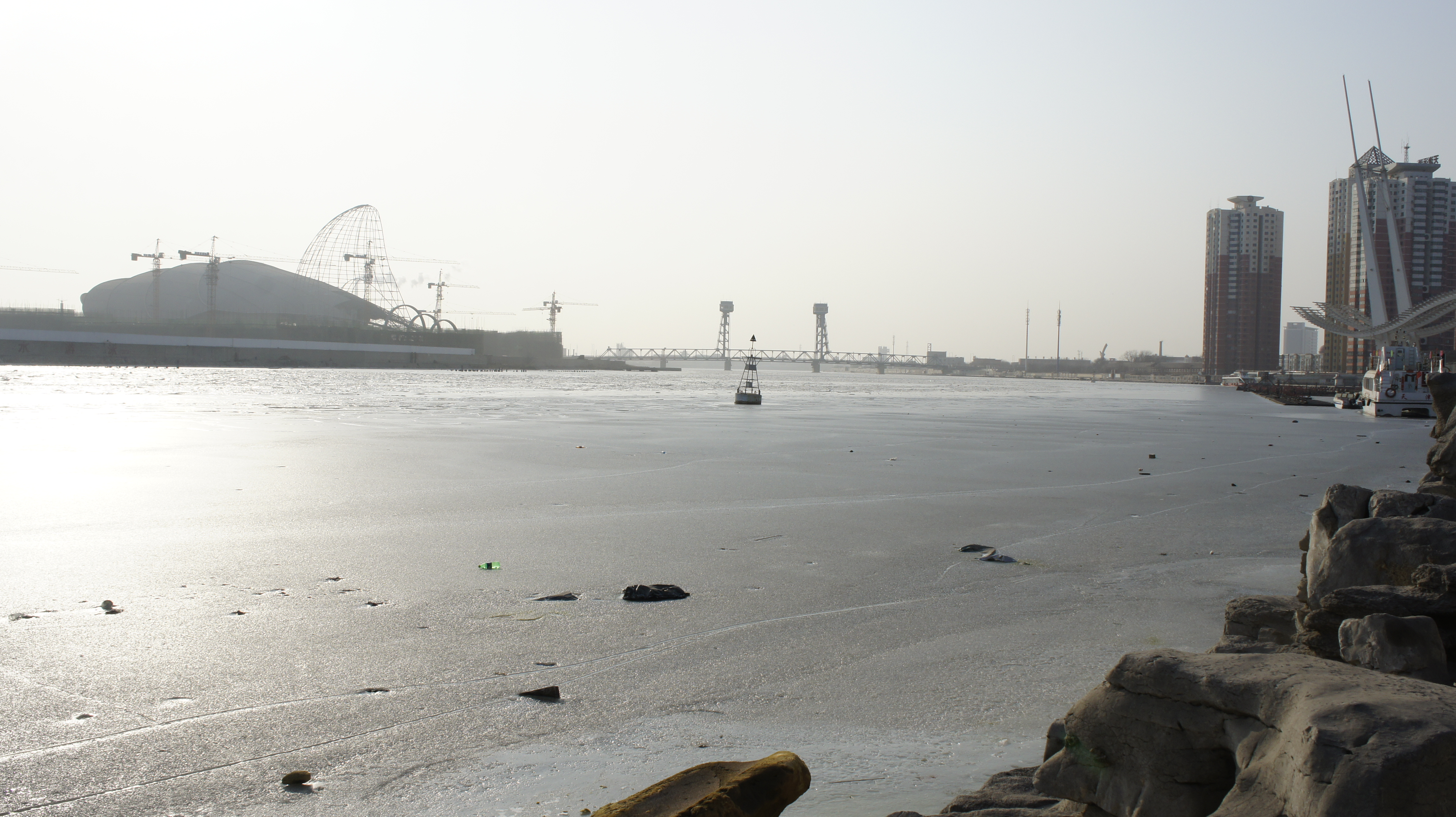
The Hai River, where Charles Elliot and Qishan met for their first negotiation.

Throughout Qishan's career, he has been both criticised and praised for his tenures and actions by the Qing government. For the first three decades of his career, Qishan had an excellent reputation, being seen as a competent administrator from both the Jiaqing Emperor and the Daoguang Emperor, due to his successful tenures in difficult posts, like in Sichuan, Zhili, Tibet, and Shangjiang. However, after signing the Convention of Chuenpi in 1841 without the permission of the emperor, Qishan's reputation declined significantly, even after being reinstated in 1842.

To the Qing Imperial court and the Daoguang Emperor himself, he was a "coward who had capitulated to the British and ceded territory." He fortunately retained, and reinforced, his good reputation as a provincial governor from 1842 to 1849, leading to the Imperial Court and the Xianfeng Emperor regaining trust in him and appointing him as the Imperial Commissioner to defeat Taiping forces in Nanjing.

Qishan's predecessor as Imperial Commissioner during the First Opium War, Lin Zexu, notably despised him, as Qishan believed in political principles that Lin strictly opposed. These principles were "pragmatism over principle, compromise over confrontation." Lin famously held Qishan in contempt for his negotiating strategies (which failed in the First Opium War, proven by the signing of the Convention of Chuenpi). Lin saw Qishan's actions as undermining his own hardline stance and betraying the Qing dynasty's dignity. Lin represented the Confucian ideal of moral absolutism, while Qishan represented the realpolitik of an official who saw military defeat as inevitable and sought to minimize the damage.

To the Borjigit Clan, Qishan's career was perceived as a massive success, as he had, in a way, reached the pinnacle of power, through becoming the Viceroy of multiple provinces, becoming part of the Jiaqing Emperor's bodyguard force, and being appointed as Imperial Commissioner of the Qing Dynasty twice.

For most of the population living in the provinces in which Qishan had governed, Qishan's reputation was that of a harsh ruler, which he was criticised for. The primary source of the criticism originated from Qishan's techniques of using overwhelming military force to control the population, and while it brought a degree of order, it was achieved through severity rather than benevolent administration.

=== Foreign powers ===
In the First Opium War, many British soldiers, including Charles Elliot, described Qishan as pragmatic, arrogant, duplicitous, condescending, and frustrating. They found him intelligent, but disliked Qishan's employment of classic Qing diplomacy tactics, which were delay, obfuscation, and feigned ignorance, all while maintaining a posture of cultural superiority. They also viewed Qishan as dishonest, as he seemed to have no intention of fulfilling the terms he had negotiated in Guangzhou and the Hai River (Tianjin).

== Legacy ==
=== Qing Dynasty ===
Despite his initial competent reputation, Qishan was instead perceived after his death as a coward due to his failures in the First Opium War and the Taiping Rebellion. His career established a pattern for Qing officials from the 1850s onwards, which was failures when battling the west, followed by political rehabilitation through internal administration. Due to his reputation, he became a symbol of the Qing's desperations to produce more effective officials, yet failing persistently.

However, Qishan still served a positive, lasting impact on the Qing Dynasty's economy, through proving the obsolescence of the Canton System, a system established by the Qianlong Emperor from 1757 to 1842 to control trade in Guangdong, where most imports occurred. Qishan proved the obsolescence of the system in 1841 when he signed the Convention of Chuenpi, implying that the Qing had to surrender as their reliance on tribalism and lack of imports as a result of the system led to their inferiority against the British in the war. As the Canton System was proven ineffective, people began to criticise the Qing Dynasty's economy, citing its incompetence compared to European nations.

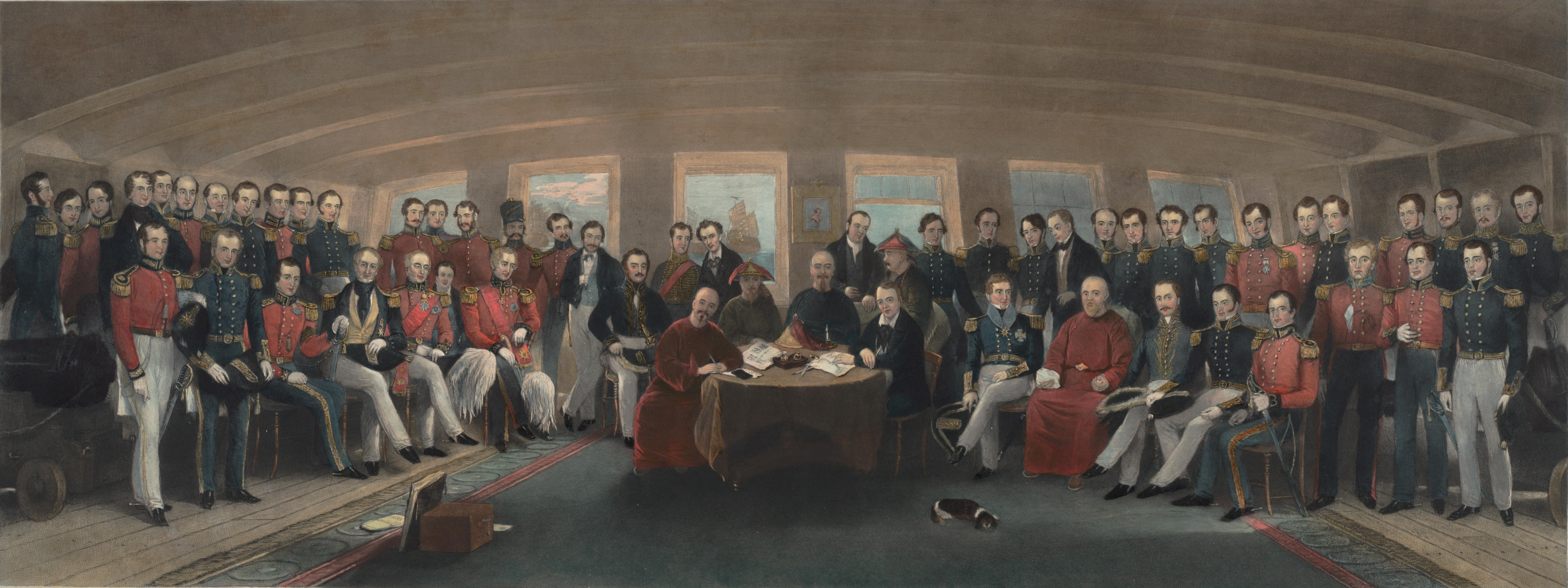
Keying, Yilibu, and Henry Pottinger signing the Treaty of Nanking under the supervision of Queen Victoria and the Daoguang Emperor on HMS Cornwallis

Furthermore, Qishan became the scapegoat for the Qing's defeat in the First Opium War, despite the fact that the Treaty of Nanking, the treaty that actually ended the war, was signed by Qing officials Keying and Yilibu on behalf of the Qing in 1842, a year after Qishan had been dismissed as Imperial Commissioner. However, the reason he is perceived as a scapegoat for the war can be attributed to the fact that the terms on the Convention of Chuenpi were very similar to the terms on the Treaty of Nanking, which resulted in the century of humiliation, a period in Chinese history from 1842 to 1949 where China struggled financially, politically, and militarily, and was often invaded and defeated by foreign countries like the Empire of Japan, Russian Empire, Second French Empire, and the British.

=== Long-term historical and symbolic legacy ===
After the Qing Dynasty's last emperor, The Xuantong Emperor, was abdicated in 1912, Qishan was vilified as a capitulator and traitor in Nationalist China and Communist China, the exact opposite of Lin. Qishan became a symbol of the corrupt, compromising Manchu aristocracy harming China. However, after 1980 under Deng Xiaoping, he became more perceived as a pragmatic realist which demonstrated the Qing's hopeless situation in the First Opium War, with an emphasis on his attempt to negotiate being a rational and tragically executed effort to minimize loss. This new perception placed the blame less on Qishan's individual failures and more on the Qing's flaws.

To the British, Qishan's tactics of delay, obfuscation, and signing agreements he knew Beijing would reject cemented a Western stereotype of Chinese diplomacy as dishonest, which strained Chinese-British relations. His dismissal as Imperial Commissioner in the First Opium War and the Convention of Chuenpi was used to display western superiority in the United Kingdom.

In modern-day China, although not as renowned as other figures from the First Opium War like Lin or the Daoguang Emperor, Qishan remains a key administrative actor, with his career and life showing how a supposedly highly-successful government can produce individuals perfectly adapted to its environment, who then fail catastrophically when that environment changes.

== In popular culture ==
In the 1997 Chinese television epic film, The Opium War, Qishan appears as a recurring character who treats the British to a lavish feast to lower tensions.

== Personal life ==
Qishan had two children. His son Jingshou (景寿) married the Daoguang Emperor's sixth daughter, Princess Hejing (固伦和静公主). Meanwhile, Qishan's daughter married the Daoguang Emperor's son, Prince Chun, making her the stepmother of the Guangxu Emperor and the step-grandmother of the Xuantong Emperor, the last Qing emperor before the Qing Dynasty was overthrown in 1912.

During negotiations with Charles Elliot in Guangzhou in the First Opium War, Qishan faked an illness to buy time. This prompted British soldiers to search Qishan's sewage, where they allegedly found traces of Opium. However, many historians approach this information with skepticism, as they believe it was Propaganda from the British.

== Gallery ==
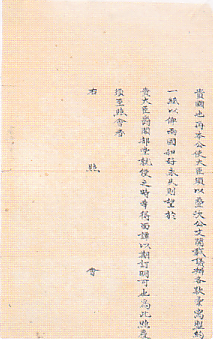
Second page of the convention

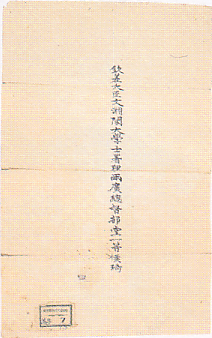
Third page

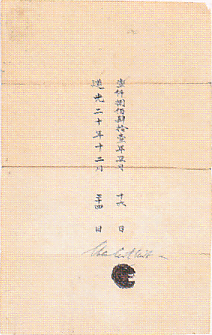
Page four, signed by Charles Elliot and Qishan

== See also ==
- Yijing
- History of opium in China
- Yang Fang
- Ge Yunfei
- Chen Huacheng

== Notes ==
Footnotes

Citations

Government offices
Preceded by Qian Zhen	Governor of Shandong (first term); 1821-1822	Succeeded by Cheng Hanzhang
Preceded by Cheng Hanzhang	Governor of Shandong (second term); 1823-1824	Succeeded by Nergingge
Preceded by Nergingge	Governor of Shandong (third term); 1825-1825	Succeeded by Yilibu
Preceded by Wei Yuanyu	Viceroy of Liangjiang; 1825-1827	Succeeded by Jiang Youxian
Preceded by Dai Sanxi	Viceroy of Sichuan (first term); 1829-1831	Succeeded by Eshan
Preceded by Mujangga	Viceroy of Zhili; 1837-1840	Succeeded by Na'erjing'e
Preceded by Lin Zexu	Viceroy of Liangguang (acting); 1840-1841	Succeeded by Qitian
Preceded by Mengbao	Imperial Resident in Tibet; 1843-1847	Succeeded by Ruiyuan
Preceded by Gioro-Baoxing	Viceroy of Sichuan (second term); 1846-1849	Succeeded by Xu Zechun
Preceded by Buyantai	Viceroy of Shaan-Gan; 1849-1851	Succeeded by Yuqian
