= Lin Zexu =

Chinese scholar-official (1785–1850)

Grand Guardian of the Heir Apparent Grand Tutor of the Heir Apparent Lin Zexu
- 林則徐
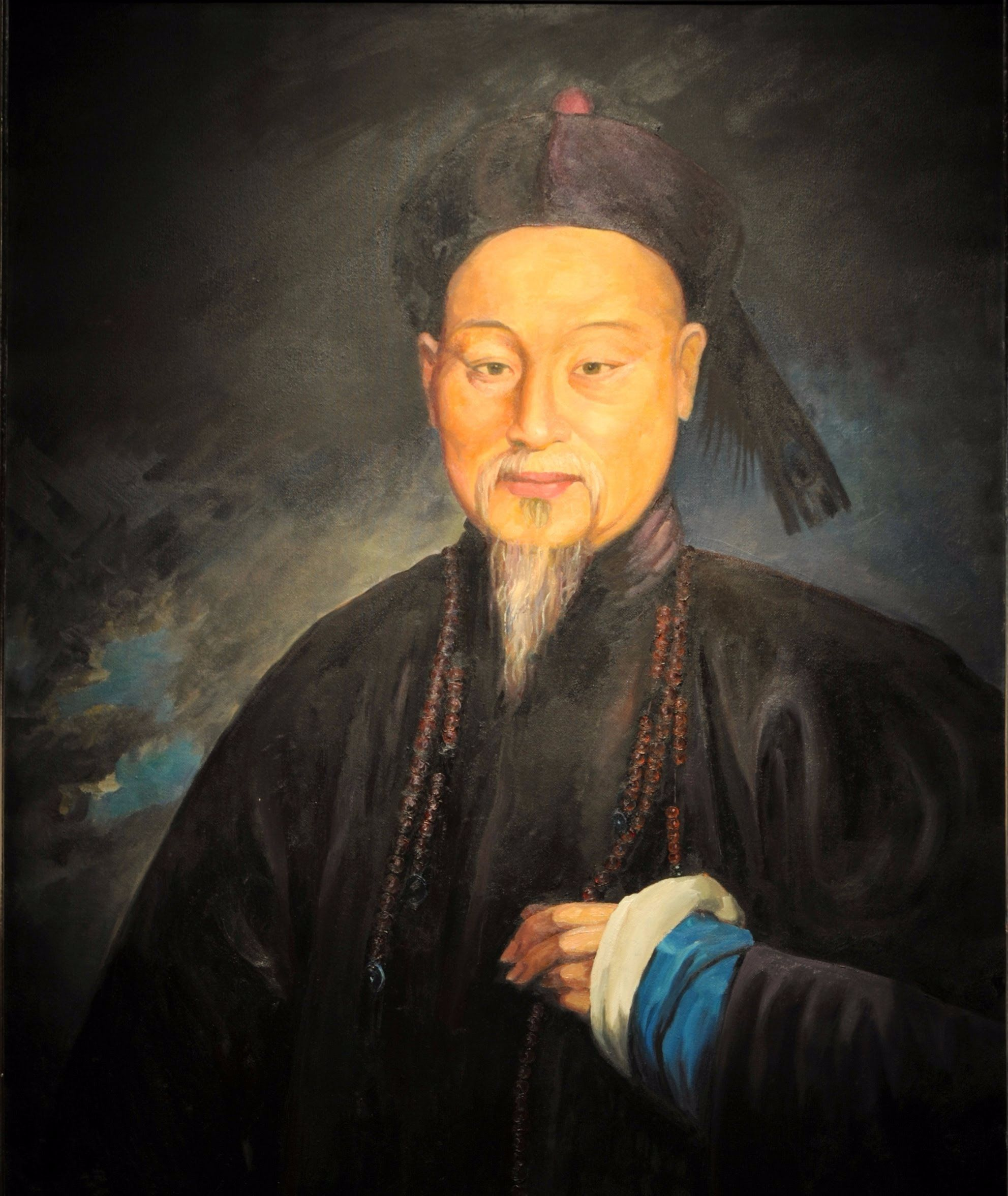
- An 1850 painting of Lin

Imperial Commissioner of the Qing
- In office 31 December 1838 – 3 October 1840
- Preceded by: Position established
- Succeeded by: Qishan

Viceroy of Liangguang
- In office 21 January 1840 – 3 October 1840
- Preceded by: Deng Tingzhen
- Succeeded by: Qishan

Viceroy of Shaan-Gan
- In office 1845 (acting)
- Preceded by: Buyantai
- Succeeded by: Yang Yizeng (acting)

Viceroy of Yun-Gui
- In office 30 April 1847 – 10 September 1849
- Preceded by: Li Xingyuan (Li Hsing-yüan)
- Succeeded by: Cheng Yuzai (Ch'eng Yü-tsai)

Viceroy of Huguang
- In office February 1837 – December 1838
- Preceded by: Nergingge
- Succeeded by: Zhou Tianjue

Personal details
- Born: 30 August 1785 Houguan County, Fujian, Qing Empire
- Died: 22 November 1850 (aged 65) Puning County, Guangdong, Qing Empire
- Relations: Shen Baozhen (son-in-law)
- Education: Jinshi 進士 degree
- Occupation: Philosopher, politician

Military service
- Battles/wars: First Opium War: Battle of Chuenpi

Lin Zexu
- Traditional Chinese: 林則徐
- Simplified Chinese: 林则徐
Transcriptions
Standard Mandarin
- Hanyu Pinyin: Lín Zéxú
- Gwoyeu Romatzyh: Lin Tzershyu
- Wade–Giles: Lin^{2} Tsê^{2}-hsü^{2}
- IPA: [lǐn tsɤ̌.ɕy̌]
Yue: Cantonese
- Yale Romanization: Làhm Jākchèuih
- Jyutping: Lam^{4} Zak^{1}-ceoi^{4}
- IPA: [lɐm˩ tsɐk̚˥.tsʰɵɥ˩]
Southern Min
- Hokkien POJ: Lîm Chek-sû
- Tâi-lô: Lîm Tsik-tshî
Eastern Min
- Fuzhou BUC: Lìng Cáik-sṳ̀

Courtesy name
- Traditional Chinese: 元撫
- Simplified Chinese: 元抚
Transcriptions
Standard Mandarin
- Hanyu Pinyin: Yuánfǔ [ɥɛ̌nfù]
- Gwoyeu Romatzyh: Yuanfuu
- Wade–Giles: Yüan^{2}-fu^{3}

Lin Zexu, Grand Guardian of the Heir Apparent (Mandarin Chinese: 林則徐; 30 August 1785 – 22 November 1850), courtesy name Yuanfu, was a Chinese political philosopher and politician. He was a governor-general and scholar-official under the Daoguang Emperor of the Qing dynasty, best known for his role in the First Opium War of 1839–42. He was from Fuzhou, Fujian Province. Lin's forceful opposition to the opium trade was a primary catalyst for the First Opium War. He is praised for his constant position on the "moral high ground" in his fight, but he is also blamed for a rigid approach which failed to account for the domestic and international complexities of the problem. The Emperor endorsed the hardline policies and anti-drugs movement advocated by Lin, but placed all responsibility for the resulting disastrous Opium War onto Lin. However, Lin's efforts against the opium trade was appreciated by drug prohibition activists. He is revered as a culture hero in Chinese culture and symbolizes drug abuse resistance in China.

== Early life and career ==
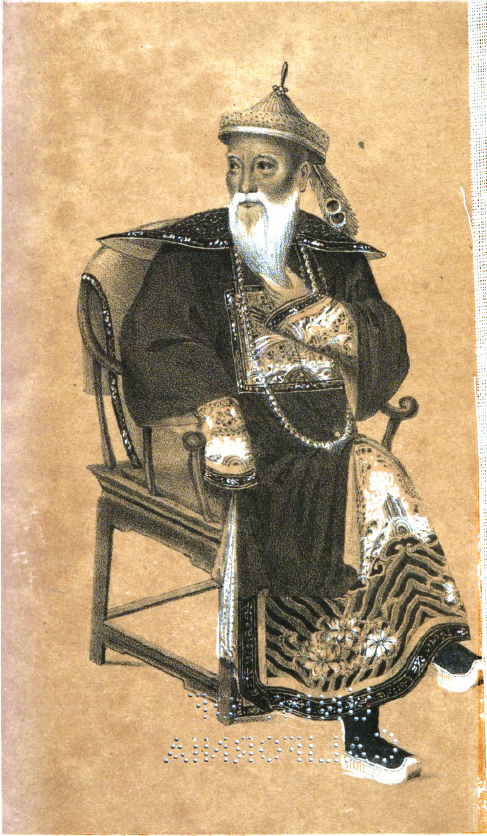
An 1843 drawing of Lin

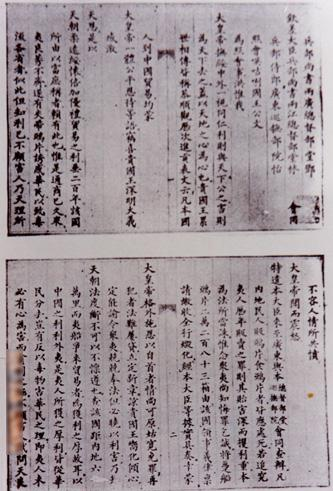
Letter from Lin Zexu to Queen Victoria, 1839

Lin was born in Houguan (侯官; modern Fuzhou, Fujian Province) towards the end of the Qianlong Emperor's reign. His father, Lin Binri (林賓日), served as an official under the Qing government. His family was from a declining land holding clan, and generations of the family had been progressively bankrupted by preparing for the civil services examination. Lin Binri himself had allegedly ruined his eyesight fruitlessly preparing for this examination and he put his sons through the same preparation in hopes of reviving his family fortune. Lin Zexu was the second son in the family. He had begun studying the classics when he was three years old. As a child, he was already "unusually brilliant". At age 12, he passed the county level exam, at age 19 he passed provincial level exam and at age 26, in 1811, he passed the metropolitan level exam in his third attempt, he obtained the position of advanced Jinshi (進士) in the imperial examination, and in the same year he gained admission to the Hanlin Academy. Despite opportunities for personal enrichment, Lin Zexu's modest upbringing steered him toward a career of exceptional bureaucratic virtue. For twenty-five years leading up to his famed intervention in the opium crisis, he was celebrated for his tireless dedication to public service, addressing issues such as hunting down pirates, repairing dams, mitigating floods, and managing the salt tax. His incorruptibility earned him the moniker 'Lin Qingtian' (Lin Clear-as-the-Heavens), and he was driven by a profound commitment to alleviate the suffering of the populace, feeling as though his "heart were on fire, his liver being stabbed" when he witnessed their distress. In his various roles, he consistently rooted out corruption, solidifying his reputation as an invaluable administrative asset. Lin's scholarly excellence earned him widespread recognition, elevating his career prospects. He rose rapidly through various grades of provincial service. He opposed the opening of China but felt the need of a better knowledge of foreigners, which drove him to collect material for a geography of the world. His interest in Western knowledge reflected his pragmatic views, acknowledging foreign influence while resisting Western domination. He later gave this material to Wei Yuan, who published the Illustrated Treatise on the Maritime Kingdoms in 1843. He became Governor-General of Hunan and Hubei in 1837, where he launched a suppression campaign against the trading of opium. Lin's role as Governor-General was pivotal in leading China's anti-opium efforts, reflecting his strong moral stance against the drug trade. Initially he was in favour of legalizing opium trade and considered growing the poppies inside China to stop the outflow of silver, but he soon changed his mind after the debate in the court was going in favour of stopping the opium trade altogether.In 1839, Lin wrote an open letter to Queen Victoria urging her to help end the opium trade.

== Campaign to suppress opium ==
Before his famed crackdown on opium, Lin Zexu initially proposed domestic opium cultivation to counter financial losses from imports, while his primary focus was reforming the expensive grain transport system to Beijing. Western observers often mischaracterized his anti-opium campaign as a clash of civilizations; however, it was largely driven by internal Chinese imperial politics and the disruptive actions of British merchants. Lin, a meticulous bureaucrat with a passion for freight management, sought a swift success in Canton to secure a coveted governorship. His approach, though seemingly xenophobic to his British adversaries, stemmed from a desire for bureaucratic efficiency rather than inherent anti-foreign sentiment. Summoned by a distraught Emperor Daoguang, as always, Lin offered certainty with his decisive solutions, proposing immediate confiscation of smoking apparatus and a radical policy of a year's suspended death sentence for opium users to compel reform through fear and public surveillance. He even touted dubious "cures" for opium addiction. Crucially, Lin and many officials overlooked the potential international ramifications of their prohibition efforts, particularly the reaction of foreign traders in Canton. This oversight, coupled with an underestimation of British military power, led to a conflict Lin seemingly had not fully anticipated, despite later claims of foresight. The Opium War, and its profound consequences, appears to have been ignited by a fit of bureaucratic urgency and a misjudgment of external forces.

He traveled to Canton, lasting two months from Beijing, with a remarkably small entourage, consisting of just an outrider, six guards, and three kitchen staff who remained constantly with him, preventing any opportunities for them to exploit local innkeepers along the route. This minimalist approach reflected his unwavering commitment to virtue. Soon after his arrival in Guangdong in the middle of 1839, Lin wrote a memorial to the "Ruler of England" in the form of an open letter published in Canton, urging England to end the opium trade. He argued that China was providing Britain with valuable commodities such as tea, porcelain, spices and silk, with Britain sending only "poison" in return. He accused the foreigner traders of coveting profit and lacking morality. His memorial expressed a desire that the ruler would act "in accordance with decent feeling" and support his efforts. Since he believed that opium was banned in the United Kingdom, he thought it was wrong for Queen Victoria to support it in China. He wrote:

We find that your country is sixty or seventy thousand li from China. The purpose of your ships in coming to China is to realize a large profit. Since this profit is realized in China and is in fact taken away from the Chinese people, how can foreigners return injury for the benefit they have received by sending this poison to harm their benefactors?

They may not intend to harm others on purpose, but the fact remains that they are so obsessed with material gain that they have no concern whatever for the harm they can cause to others. Have they no conscience? I have heard that you strictly prohibit opium in your own country, indicating unmistakably that you know how harmful opium is. You do not wish opium to harm your own country, but you choose to bring that harm to other countries such as China. Why?

The products that originate from China are all useful items. They are good for food and other purposes and are easy to sell. Has China produced one item that is harmful to foreign countries? For instance, tea and rhubarb are so important to foreigners' livelihood that they have to consume them every day. Were China to concern herself only with her own advantage without showing any regard for other people's welfare, how could foreigners continue to live?

I have heard that the areas under your direct jurisdiction such as London, Scotland, and Ireland do not produce opium; it is produced instead in your Indian possessions such as Bengal, Madras, Bombay, Patna, and Malwa. In these possessions the English people not only plant opium poppies that stretch from one mountain to another but also open factories to manufacture this terrible drug.

As months accumulate and years pass by, the poison they have produced increases in its wicked intensity, and its repugnant odor reaches as high as the sky. Heaven is furious with anger, and all the gods are moaning with pain! It is hereby suggested that you destroy and plow under all of these opium plants and grow food crops instead, while issuing an order to punish severely anyone who dares to plant opium poppies again.

A murderer of one person is subject to the death sentence; just imagine how many people opium has killed! This is the rationale behind the new law which says that any foreigner who brings opium to China will be sentenced to death by hanging or beheading. Our purpose is to eliminate this poison once and for all and to the benefit of all mankind.

— Lin Zexu,

The letter elicited no response (sources suggest that it was lost in transit), but it was later reprinted in the London Times as a direct appeal to the British public.

An edict from the Daoguang Emperor followed on 18 March, emphasising the serious penalties for opium smuggling that would now apply.

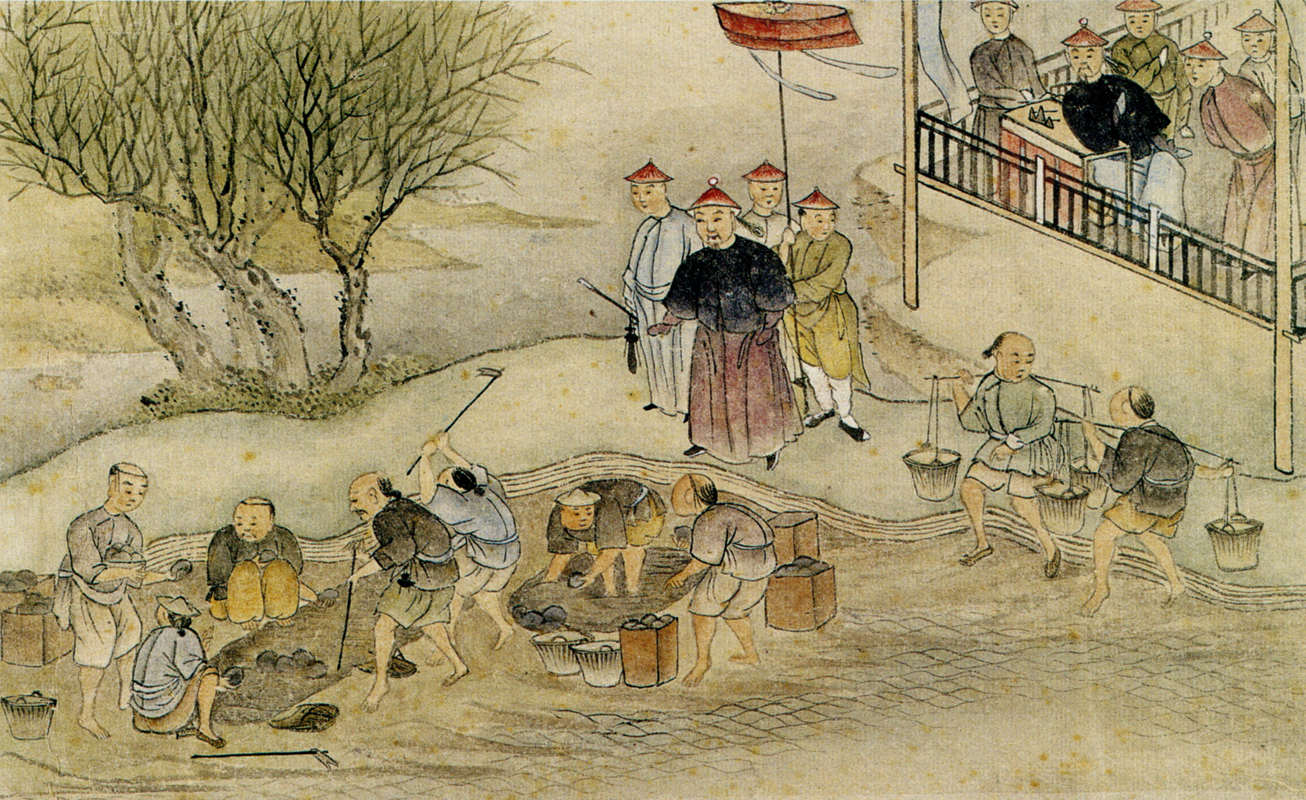
Lin supervising the destruction of opium

In March 1839, Lin started to take measures that would eliminate the opium trade. He was a formidable bureaucrat known for his competence and high moral standards, with an imperial commission from the Daoguang Emperor to halt the illegal importation of opium by the British. He made changes within a matter of months. He arrested more than 1,700 Chinese opium dealers and confiscated over 70,000 opium pipes. He initially attempted to get foreign companies to forfeit their opium stores in exchange for tea, but this ultimately failed. Lin resorted to using force in the western merchants' enclave. A month and a half later, the merchants gave up nearly 1.2 million kg (2.6 million pounds) of opium. Beginning 3 June 1839, 500 workers laboured for 23 days to destroy it, mixing the opium with lime and salt and throwing it into the sea outside of Humen Town. Lin composed an elegy apologising to the gods of the sea for polluting their realm.

Lin and the Daoguang Emperor, comments historian Jonathan Spence, "seemed to have believed that the citizens of Canton and the foreign traders there had simple, childlike natures that would respond to firm guidance and statements of moral principles set out in simple, clear terms." Neither Lin nor the emperor appreciated the depth or changed nature of the problem. They did not see the change in international trade structures, the commitment of the British government to protecting the interests of private traders, and the peril to British traders who would surrender their opium.

Open hostilities between China and Britain started in 1839 in what later would be called the "First Opium War". The immediate effect was that both sides, by the words of Charles Elliot and Lin, banned all trade. Before this, Lin had pressured the Portuguese government of Macau, so the British found themselves without refuge, except for the bare and rocky harbours of Hong Kong. Soon, however, the Chinese forces faced a British naval fleet, which included the East India Company's steam warship Nemesis and improved weapons, and were soon routed.

== Exile in Xinjiang ==
Lin made significant preparations for war against the possible British invasion. The British sailed north to attack Jiangsu and Zhejiang. The governors of these two provinces failed to heed a warning from Lin, however, and were unprepared when the British easily landed and occupied Dinghai.

This unpreparedness was partly due to the Qing dynasty's ongoing issues with corruption and inefficiency within the local governments. These problems hindered their ability to respond effectively to Lin's warnings.

Lin became a scapegoat for these losses due to court politics. As punishment, he was exiled to the remote Ili region in Xinjiang. His position was then given to Qishan in September 1840.

While in Xinjiang, Lin was the first Chinese scholar to record several aspects of Muslim culture there. In 1850, he noted in a poem that the Muslims in Ili did not worship idols but bowed and prayed to tombs decorated with poles that had the tails of cows and horses attached to them. This was the widespread shamanic practice of erecting a tugh, but this was its first recorded appearance in Chinese writings. He also recorded several Kazakh oral tales, such as one concerning a green goat spirit of the lake whose appearance is a harbinger of hail or rain.

Lin’s documentation of these practices contributed to a broader understanding of ethnic minorities in China, showcasing the diversity of cultural practices within the empire at the time. In 1843 while in Xinjiang, Lin also met Buyantai, the Governor at the time, alongside Yishan, who had also been dismissed from his position during the First Opium War. Buyantai and Lin formed a close friendship until the former's death.

The Qing government ultimately rehabilitated Lin. In 1845, he was appointed Governor-General of Shaan-Gan (Shaanxi-Gansu). In 1847, he became governor-General of Yun-Gui (Yunnan-Guizhou). While these posts were considered less prestigious, Lin continued to advocate for reform in opium policy and addressed issues of local governance and corruption. His efforts remained influential, albeit limited, in shaping Qing policy. These posts were less prestigious than his previous position in Canton; thus his career never fully recovered from the failures there.

== Death and legacy ==
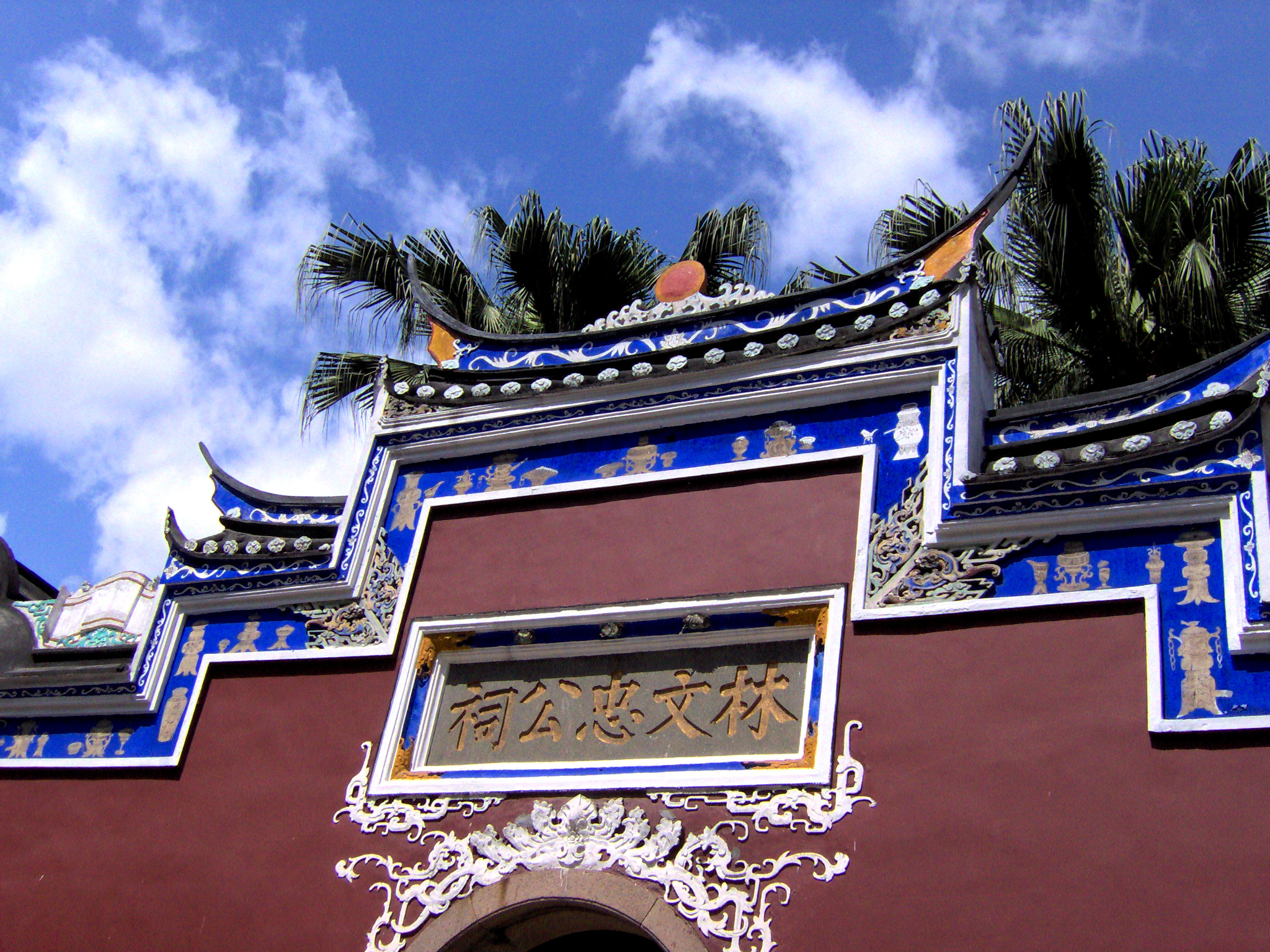
The Lin Zexu Memorial in Fuzhou from 2004

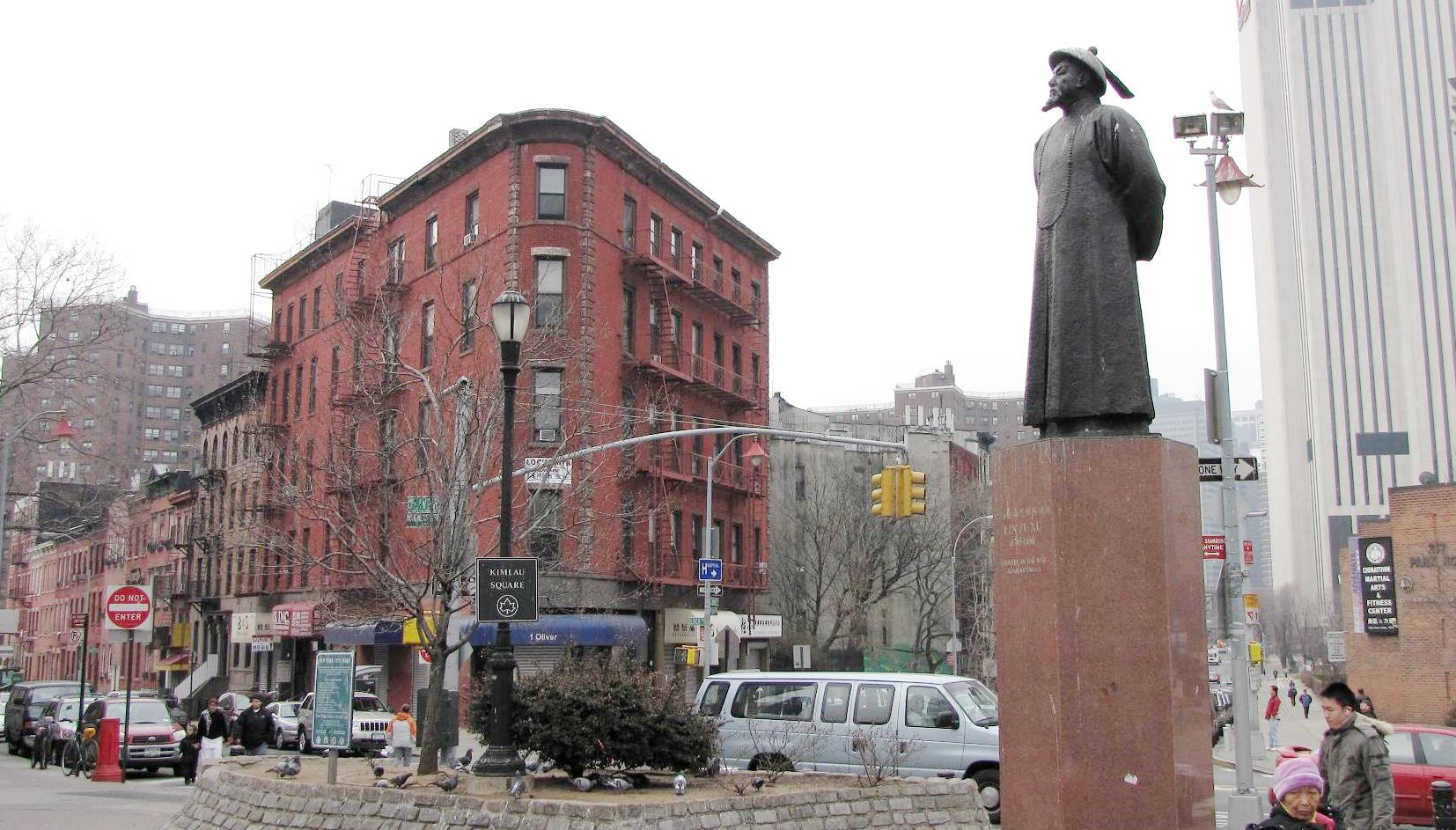
Statue of Lin Zexu in Chatham Square in Chinatown, Manhattan, New York City, United States

Lin died in 1850 while on the way to Guangxi Province, where the Qing government was sending him to help put down the Taiping Rebellion. Though he was originally blamed for causing the First Opium War, Lin's reputation was rehabilitated in the last years of the Qing dynasty, as efforts were made once more to eradicate opium production and trade. He became a symbol of the fight against opium and other drug trades, with his image displayed in parades, and his writings quoted approvingly by anti-opium and anti-drugs reformers.

Despite the antagonism between the Chinese and the British at the time, the English sinologist Herbert Giles praised and admired Lin: "He was a fine scholar, a just and merciful official and a true patriot."

Lin's former home, situated in Fuzhou's historic Sanfang-Qixiang 三方七巷 ("Three Lanes and Seven Alleys") district, is open to the public. Inside, his work as a government official, including the opium trade and other work where he improved agricultural methods, championed water conservation (including his work to save Fuzhou's West Lake from becoming a rice field) and his campaign against corruption are well documented.

In China, Lin is popularly viewed as a national hero and culture hero against drug abuse. June 3—the day when Lin confiscated the chests of opium—is unofficially celebrated as Opium Suppression Movement Day in Taiwan, whereas June 26 is recognized as the International Day against Drug Abuse and Illicit Trafficking in honour of Lin's work. Monuments to Lin have been constructed in Chinese communities around the world. A statue of Lin stands in Chatham Square in Chinatown, New York City, United States. The base of the statue is inscribed with "Pioneer in the war against drugs" in English and Chinese. A wax statue of Lin also appeared in Madame Tussauds wax museum in London.

Lin is a character in Amitav Ghosh's Ibis trilogy, premiering in the second novel, River of Smoke. The work of historical fiction is set in the lead up to the Opium Wars while also offering a contemporary critique of globalisation.

He was also depicted in film, such as in the 1997 movie The Opium War.

His grandson Commodore Lin Taizeng was an officer in the Beiyang Fleet and commanded one of China's two modern battleships purchased from Germany in the 1880s, Zhenyuan, during the First Sino-Japanese War (1894–1895). He committed suicide with an opium overdose after the ship ran aground and had to be abandoned.

Lin descendants are living in Fuzhou, Fujian and surroundings, Jieyang (Puning), Meizhou, Guangdong and surroundings, various places in China, Denmark, and United States.

Lin is remembered for a couplet he wrote while serving as an imperial envoy in Guangdong:

海納百川，
有容乃大。
壁立千仞，
無欲則剛。

Translation:

The sea accepts the waters of a hundred rivers,
Its tolerance results in its grandeur.
The cliff towers to a height of a thousand ren,
Its lack of desire gives it its resilience.

In particular, the first half of the couplet was chosen as the motto for Chinese Wikipedia.

== See also ==
- History of opium in China
- International Day against Drug Abuse and Illicit Trafficking
- 7145 Linzexu, minor planet named after him
- Prohibition (drugs)

== Sources ==
- Chang, Hsin-pao (1964). Commissioner Lin and the Opium War. Cambridge: Harvard University Press.
- de Bary, Wm Theodore; Lufrano, Richard (2000). Sources of Chinese Tradition: From 1600 Through the Twentieth Century. Vol. 2. Columbia University Press. ISBN 978-0-231-11271-0.
- Ebrey, Patricia Buckley; Walthall, Anne; Palais, James B. (2006). East Asia: A Cultural, Social, and Political History. Houghton Mifflin Company. ISBN 0-618-13384-4.
- Hanes, William Travis; Sanello, Frank (2004). The Opium Wars: The Addiction of One Empire and the Corruption of Another. Sourcebooks, Inc. ISBN 0-7607-7638-5.
- Kuo, Pin-Chia (1935). A Critical Study of the First Anglo-Chinese War, With Documents. Shanghai: Commercial Press.
- Lee, Khoon Choy (2005). Pioneers of Modern China: Understanding the Inscrutable Chinese. World Scientific. ISBN 978-981-270-090-2.
- Lovell, Julia (2011a). The Opium War: Drugs, Dreams and the Making of Modern China. London: Picador. ISBN 9780330537858.
- Lovell, Julia (2011b). The Opium War: Drugs, Dreams and the Making of China. London: Picador. ISBN 978-1-4472-0410-7.
- Madancy, Joyce A. (2003). The Troublesome Legacy of Commissioner Lin: The Opium Trade and Opium Suppression in Fujian Province, 1820s to 1920s. Harvard University Asia Center. ISBN 9780674012158.
- Spence, Jonathan D. (1999). The Search for Modern China. New York: Norton. ISBN 0393973514.
- Teng, Ssu-yu; Fairbank, John King (1979). China's Response to the West: A Documentary Survey, 1839-1923. Harvard University Press. ISBN 9780674120259.

Government offices
Preceded by Deng Tingzhen	Viceroy of Liangguang; 1840	Succeeded by Qishan
