= Nergingge =

Grand Secretary of the Wenyuan Library
- In office 28 September 1852 – 6 October 1853

Assistant Grand Secretary
- In office 2 February 1852 – 28 September 1852

Viceroy of Zhili
- In office 4 October 1840 – 6 October 1853
- Preceded by: Qishan
- Succeeded by: Guiliang

Viceroy of Zhili
- In office 23 August 1840 – 26 September 1840
- Preceded by: Hūsungge
- Succeeded by: Entehengge

Viceroy of Huguang
- In office 20 September 1832 – 10 February 1837
- Preceded by: Lu Kun
- Succeeded by: Lin Zexu

Personal details
- Born: 1784
- Died: 1857 (aged 72–73)

Nergingge or Ná’erhgingá (Chinese: 訥爾經額; pinyin: Nèěrjīng'é, Manchu: ᠨᡝᡵᡤᡳᠩᡤᡝ) was a Qing dynasty official who was Viceroy of Zhili from 26 February 1841 - 6 October 1853, Viceroy of Huguang in 1840, and Viceroy of Shaan-Gan. He was a member of the Plain White Banner Feimo clan.
