= 1924 in China =

- Decades: 1900s; 1910s; 1920s; 1930s; 1940s
- See also: Other events of 1924; History of China • Timeline • Years

Events in the year 1924 in China.

== Incumbents ==
- President — Cao Kun until October 30, Duan Qirui
- Premier — Gao Lingwei until January 12, Sun Baoqi until July 2, Yan Huiqing until October 31, Huang Fu

== Events ==
- June 16 — Whampoa Military Academy is founded in China.
- September 15 – November 3 — Second Zhili–Fengtian War: conflict in the Republic of China's Warlord Era between the Zhili and Fengtian cliques for control of Beijing.
- August–October — Canton Merchants' Corps Uprising
- October — Beijing Coup, coup d'état by Feng Yuxiang against Chinese President Cao Kun, leader of the Zhili clique. Feng called it the Capital Revolution (Chinese: 首都革命; pinyin: Shǒudū Gémìng). The coup occurred at a crucial moment in the Second Zhili–Fengtian War and allowed the pro-Japanese Fengtian clique to defeat the previously dominant Zhili clique

== Births ==
- January 31 — Irene Chou, Hong Kong artist (d. 2011)
- February 19 — Chi Pang-yuan, Taiwanese writer, academic and Chinese-English translator (d. 2024)
- March — Zhu Liang, politician (d. 2025)
- March 10 — Jin Yong, Hong Kong wuxia novelist (d. 2018)
- April 27 — Hu Yamei, physician and medical researcher (d. 2019)
- May 21 — Yan Jinxuan, composer (d. 2014)
- June 25 — Deng Jiaxian, theoretical physicist and nuclear physicist (d. 1986)
- July 1 — Wang Huo, novelist and screenwriter (d. 2025)
- July 2 — Chia-ying Yeh, Chinese Canadian sinologist (d. 2024)
- July 12 — Zhu Qihe, physical chemist (d. 2024)
- July 19 — Lin Ruo, 11th Secretary of the Guangdong Provincial Committee of the Chinese Communist Party (d. 2012)
- August 5 — Huang Hongjia, scientist (d. 2021)
- August 9 — Huang Yongyu, painter and scholar of Tujia ethnicity (d. 2023)
- August 23 — Wang Danfeng, actress (d. 2018)
- September 1 — Yuan-Shih Chow, Chinese and American probabilist (d. 2022)
- September 24 — Shi Suxi, Chinese Buddhist priest (d. 2006)
- October 2 — Zheng Zhemin, explosives engineer (d. 2021)
- October 4 — Samuel Lamb, protestant pastor (d. 2013)
- November 6 — Chen Haozhu, cardiologist (d. 2020)
- November 10 — Tsai Wan-lin, Taiwanese businessman (d. 2004)
- November 13 — Dai Lixin, chemist (d. 2024)
- November 14 — Chen Man Hin, Malaysian Chinese politician and physician (d. 2022)
- November 30 — Wang Zhenyi, pathophysiologist and hematologist
- December 20 — Ye Xuanping, 12th Governor of Guangdong (d. 2019)
- December 24 — Qiao Shi, 6th Chairman of the Standing Committee of the National People's Congress (d. 2015)
- December 25 — Zhu Guangya, nuclear physicist (d. 2011)

=== Dates unknown ===
- Li Han, MiG-15 pilot (d. 1997)

== Deaths ==
- May 10 — Liang Dunyan, diplomat and politician (b. 1857)
- June 2 — Ma Fuxing, military commander (b. 1864)
- June 5 — Qian Nengxun, 9th Premier of the Republic of China (b. 1869)
- July 12 — Ni Sichong, general (b. 1868)
- September 22 — Wong Nai Siong, revolutionary leader and educator (b. 1849)
- September 24 — Imperial Noble Consort Wenjing, consort of Emperor Guangxu (b. 1873)
- October 9 — Lin Shu, man of letters (b. 1852)
- November 12 — Tian Wenlie, politician (b. 1858)
- December 24 — Princess Rongshou, princess of the Qing dynasty (b. 1854)

== See also ==
- Warlord Era
- First Zhili–Fengtian War
- Zhang Zuolin
