= 1862 in China =

- Decades: 1840s; 1850s; 1860s; 1870s; 1880s
- See also: Other events of 1862; History of China • Timeline • Years

Events from the year 1862 in China.

== Incumbents ==
- Tongzhi Emperor (1st year)
  - Regent: Empress Dowager Cixi
  - Regent: Prince Gong

=== Viceroys ===
- Viceroy of Zhili — Wenyu
- Viceroy of Min-Zhe — Qingrui then Qiling
- Viceroy of Huguang — Guanwen
- Viceroy of Shaan-Gan — Linkui then Shen Xiaolin then Enlin then Xilin
- Viceroy of Liangguang — Lao Chongguang then Liu Changyou
- Viceroy of Yun-Gui — Pan Duo
- Viceroy of Sichuan — Luo Bingzhang
- Viceroy of Liangjiang — Zeng Guofan

== Events ==
- Nian Rebellion
- Taiping Rebellion
  - Battle of Shanghai (1861)
  - Battle of Cixi
  - Taiping troops approach southeastern Shaanxi in the spring of 1862, the local Han Chinese, encouraged by the Qing government, formed Yong Ying militias to defend the region against the attackers. Afraid of the now-armed Han, the Muslims formed their own militia units as a response.
- Miao Rebellion (1854–73)
- Dungan Revolt (1862–77) begins
  - June — Siege of Xi'an
- Panthay Rebellion
  - rebel commander Ma Rulong surrenders and defects to the Qing
- Tongzhi Restoration

== Deaths ==
- Frederick Townsend Ward, mortally wounded in the Battle of Cixi
- Auguste Léopold Protet, French naval officer killed in Shanghai
