= 1861 in China =

- Decades: 1840s; 1850s; 1860s; 1870s; 1880s
- See also: Other events of 1861; History of China • Timeline • Years

Events from the year 1861 in China.

== Incumbents ==
- Xianfeng Emperor (12th year)
- Tongzhi Emperor
  - Regent: Empress Dowager Cixi
  - Regent: Prince Gong

=== Viceroys ===
- Viceroy of Zhili — Hengfu then Wenyu
- Viceroy of Min-Zhe — Qingrui
- Viceroy of Huguang — Guanwen
- Viceroy of Shaan-Gan — Xilin
- Viceroy of Liangguang — Lao Chongguang
- Viceroy of Yun-Gui — Lin Yuanhao then Fuqing then Pan Duo
- Viceroy of Sichuan — Chongshi then Luo Bingzhang
- Viceroy of Liangjiang — Zeng Guofan

== Events ==
- Nian Rebellion
- Taiping Rebellion
  - Battle of Guanzhong (1861)
  - Battle of Shanghai (1861)
  - Battle of Wuhan (1861)
  - Ningbo surrenders to Taiping forces
- Eulenburg expedition
- Miao Rebellion (1854–73)
- Panthay Rebellion
- Xinyou Coup, Cixi seizes power
- Prince Gong made regent
  - establishes the Zongli Yamen after the Convention of Peking
- Tongzhi Restoration
- Self-Strengthening Movement begins

== Births ==
- Cheng Biguang
- Duanfang
- Liu Guanxiong
- Jiang Chaozong, (江朝宗) Kō Kōketsu; 1861–1943) was a general in the late Empire of China and an acting Premier of the Republic of China in 1917.
- Wang Zhanyuan
- Zhan Tianyou (Jeme Tien-yow), the father of China’s railroads

== Deaths ==
- Zaiyuan
- Xianfeng Emperor
- Sushun
- Duanhua
- Hu Linyi
