= 1863 in China =

- Decades: 1840s; 1850s; 1860s; 1870s; 1880s
- See also: Other events of 1863; History of China • Timeline • Years

Events from the year 1863 in China.

== Incumbents ==
- Tongzhi Emperor (3rd year)
  - Regent: Empress Dowager Cixi
  - Regent: Prince Gong

=== Viceroys ===
- Viceroy of Zhili — Wenyu then Liu Changyou
- Viceroy of Min-Zhe — Qiling then Zuo Zongtang
- Viceroy of Huguang — Guanwen
- Viceroy of Shaan-Gan — Xilin
- Viceroy of Liangguang — Liu Changyou then Yan Duanshu then Mao Hongbin
- Viceroy of Yun-Gui — Pan Duo then Lao Changguang
- Viceroy of Sichuan — Luo Bingzhang
- Viceroy of Liangjiang — Zeng Guofan

== Events ==
- Taiping Rebellion
  - Taiping Commander Shi Dakai surrenders to the Qing
  - Battle of Suzhou (1863)
- Nian Rebellion
- Miao Rebellion (1854–73)
- Dungan Revolt (1862–77)
- Panthay Rebellion
- Tongzhi Restoration

== Deaths ==
- Tan Shaoguang, betrayed and killed in Suzhou
- Shi Dakai, executed in Chengdu
