= 1857 in China =

- Decades: 1830s; 1840s; 1850s; 1860s; 1870s
- See also: Other events of 1857; History of China • Timeline • Years

Events from the year 1857 in China.

== Incumbents ==
- Xianfeng Emperor (7th year)

=== Viceroys ===
- Viceroy of Zhili — Guiliang (- Jan.), Tan Tingxiang (Jan. - )
- Viceroy of Min-Zhe — Wang Yide
- Viceroy of Huguang — Guanwen
- Viceroy of Shaan-Gan — Yue Bin
- Viceroy of Liangguang — Ye Mingchen
- Viceroy of Yun-Gui — Hengchun then Wu Zhenyu
- Viceroy of Sichuan — Wu Zhenyu then Wang Qingyun
- Viceroy of Liangjiang — Zhao Dezhe then He Guiqing

== Events ==
- Nian Rebellion
- Second Opium War
  - January 4 — Battle of Macao Fort
  - December 28–31 — Battle of Canton (1857)
- Taiping Rebellion
- Miao Rebellion (1854–73)
- Panthay Rebellion
- Ningpo massacre
- April 20 — James Bruce, 8th Earl of Elgin appointed plenipotentiary to China.

== Births ==
- Canton — Gin Chow, (1857 – 1933) Chinese immigrant who gained fame in California as a prophet and fortune teller able to predict the weather and other natural events
- Penang, British Malaya — Gu Hongming, (1857 – 1928) was a British Malaya born Chinese man of letters. He also used the pen name "Amoy Ku", later served in the Qing government
- Chengdu — Li Donghai, (1857–1938) a traditional Chinese medicine practitioner
- October 18, Dantu, Jiangsu — Liu E, (1857 – 1909) writer, archaeologist and politician of the late Qing Dynasty
- Gansu — Ma Qixi (1857–1914), a Hui from Gansu, was the founder of the Xidaotang, a Chinese-Islamic school of thought
- Hefei, Anhui — Li Jingxi (1857-?) politician in the Republic of China. He was the Premier of State Council in May–July 1917.[1]
- 20 September 1857 — Imperial Noble Consort Gongsu (1857 – 1921) consort of the Tongzhi Emperor of the Qing dynasty
- Jiangsu — Mary Tape (1857–1934) was a desegregation activist who fought for Chinese-Americans' access to education, notably in the case Tape v. Hurley in 1885

== Deaths ==
- November 23 — Ren Xiong (1823 – 1857) painter from Xiaoshan, Zhejiang
