= 1856 in China =

- Decades: 1830s; 1840s; 1850s; 1860s; 1870s
- See also: Other events of 1856; History of China • Timeline • Years

Events from the year 1856 in China.

== Incumbents ==
- Xianfeng Emperor (6th year)

=== Viceroys ===
- Viceroy of Zhili — Guiliang
- Viceroy of Min-Zhe — Wang Yide
- Viceroy of Huguang — Guanwen
- Viceroy of Shaan-Gan — Yi Tang then Yue Bin
- Viceroy of Liangguang — Ye Mingchen
- Viceroy of Yun-Gui — Hengchun
- Viceroy of Sichuan — Huang Zonghan then Wu Zhenyu
- Viceroy of Liangjiang — Yiliang

== Events ==
- Nian Rebellion
  - several Nian bands formed an alliance led by Zhang Lexing, organizing themselves into a loose confederation of five armies
- Second Opium War begins
  - Authorities in Canton order attacks on Thirteen Factories, which are subsequently destroyed in a fire
  - Merchant ship Arrow seized by Qing authorities
  - Battle of Canton (1856)
  - Capture of the French Folly Fort
  - Battle of the Bogue (1856)
  - November — Battle of the Barrier Forts
- Taiping Rebellion
  - Battle of Jiangnan (1856), Qing forces twice fail to re-take Nanjing
  - Tianjing incident, internal conflict within the Taiping Heavenly Kingdom
- Miao Rebellion (1854–73)
- Panthay Rebellion
  - a massacre of at least 4,000 Muslims organized by a Qing Manchu official responsible for suppressing the revolt in the provincial capital of Kunming sparked a province-wide multi-ethnic insurgency.
- Red Turban Rebellion (1854–1856) ends

== Deaths ==
- Yang Xiuqing in Tianjing
- Jirhangga, Qing commander in Battle of Jiangnan (1860)
- Xiang Rong, Qing commander in Battle of Jiangnan (1860)
- Hu Jiumei, Chinese rebel in the Taiping Rebellion
