= 1855 in China =

- Decades: 1830s; 1840s; 1850s; 1860s; 1870s
- See also: Other events of 1855; History of China • Timeline • Years

Events from the year 1855 in China.

== Incumbents ==
- Xianfeng Emperor (5th year)

=== Viceroys ===
- Viceroy of Zhili — Guiliang
- Viceroy of Min-Zhe — Wang Yide
- Viceroy of Huguang — Yang Pei then Guanwen
- Viceroy of Shaan-Gan — Yi Tang
- Viceroy of Liangguang — Ye Mingchen
- Viceroy of Yun-Gui — Hengchun
- Viceroy of Sichuan — Huang Zonghan
- Viceroy of Liangjiang — Yiliang

== Events ==
- Nian Rebellion
  - Zhang Lexing took direct action by launching attacks against government troops in central China
  - By the summer, the fast-moving Nian cavalry, well-trained and fully equipped with modern firearms, had cut the lines of communication between Beijing and the Qing armies fighting the Taiping rebels in the south.
- Taiping Rebellion
  - March — Northern Expedition (Taiping Rebellion) defeated, Taiping advance in Northern China halted
  - The 3,000 kilns at Jingdezhen, Jiangxi are destroyed by the Taipings
- Miao Rebellion (1854–1873)
- Western naval campaigns against Chinese pirates
  - Battle of the Leotung
  - Battle of Ty-ho Bay
- Third plague pandemic, major bubonic plague pandemic that begins in Yunnan and later spread across China and into India
- Punti–Hakka Clan Wars begin
- Red Turban Rebellion (1854–1856)

== Births ==
- Gurun Princess Rong'an (7 May 1855 – 28 February 1875) was a princess of the Qing Dynasty
- Xu Shichang (October 20, 1855 – June 5, 1939) was the President of the Republic of China, in Beijing, from 10 October 1918 to 2 June 1922. The only permanent president of the Beiyang government to be a civilian, his presidency was also the longest of the warlord era.
- Metrophanes, Chi Sung (December 10, 1855 – June 10, 1900) was the first Chinese Eastern Orthodox priest to be martyred. He was killed with his family members and church followers in 1900 during the Boxer Rebellion
- Ni Tian (1855–1919); born as Baotian, courtesy name Mogeng, sobriquet as Modaoren and Biyuehezhu, was a Chinese painter in Qing Dynasty and Republic Period.
- Ma Anliang (1855 – November 24, 1918) was a Hui born in Hezhou, Gansu, China. He became a general in the Qing dynasty army, and of the Republic of China.
- Bi Xiugu (1855-1930) also known as Xiao Baicai and Bi Jinlian was the main figure of a cause célèbre in 1870s China known as Yang Niawu and Xiao Baicai

== Deaths ==
- Liang Fa (1789–1855), also known by other names, was the second Chinese Protestant convert and the first Chinese Protestant minister and evangelist
- Empress Xiaojingcheng (19 June 1812 – 21 August 1855) was an Imperial Noble Consort of the Daoguang Emperor of the Qing dynasty.
- Li Kaifang, killed in the Taiping Rebellion's Northern Expedition
- Bao Shichen, killed in the Taiping Rebellion's Northern Expedition
