= 1864 in China =

- Decades: 1840s; 1850s; 1860s; 1870s; 1880s
- See also: Other events of 1864; History of China • Timeline • Years

Events from the year 1864 in China.

== Incumbents ==
- Tongzhi Emperor (4th year)
  - Regent: Empress Dowager Cixi
  - Regent: Prince Gong

=== Viceroys ===
- Viceroy of Zhili — Liu Changyou
- Viceroy of Min-Zhe — Zuo Zongtang
- Viceroy of Huguang — Guanwen
- Viceroy of Shaan-Gan — Xilin then Yang Yuebin
- Viceroy of Liangguang — Mao Hongbin
- Viceroy of Yun-Gui — Lao Changguang
- Viceroy of Sichuan — Luo Bingzhang
- Viceroy of Liangjiang — Zeng Guofan

== Events ==
- Taiping Rebellion
  - Battle of Fujian
  - Battle of Hubei
  - July 1864 - Third Battle of Nanking, Fall of Tianjing, Taiping Rebellion mostly ends
  - Battle of Changzhou
- Nian Rebellion
- Miao Rebellion (1854–73)
- Dungan Revolt (1862–77)
- Panthay Rebellion
- Tongzhi Restoration

== Deaths ==
- Hong Xiuquan (1814–1864)
