= Lao Junzhan =

Chinese activist (born 1900)

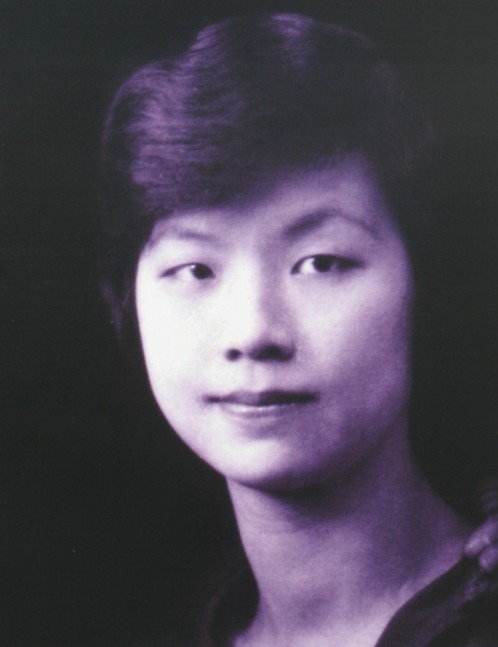
- Born: November 4, 1900; Hunan, Changsha Fu, Changsha County or Shanhua County (Within present-day Changsha City boundaries)
- Died: January 3, 1976 (aged 75); China, Beijing City
- Education: ZhouNan High School, Changsha
- Occupation: Educator
- Years active: 20th Century
- Known for: Jiusan Society Founder
- Spouse: Xu Deheng

Chinese name
- Chinese: 勞君展
Transcriptions
Standard Mandarin
- Hanyu Pinyin: Láo Jūnzhǎn
- Wade–Giles: Lao Chünchan

Lao Junzhan (Chinese: 勞君展; pinyin: Láo Jūnzhǎn; 4 November 1900 – 3 January 1976) was an activist who was a member of Xinmin Society and founder of Jiusan Society.

== Life ==
Born in Changsha (contemporaneously Changsha Fu, Changsha County or Shanhua County), Lao Junzhan's grandfather Lao Chongguang once served as the Viceroy of Liangguang. Lao graduated from ZhouNan High School, Changsha and on April 1918, joined the Xinmin Society formed by Mao Zedong and Cai Hesen at Changsha. She participated in a movement to expel Zhang Jingyao and also the May Fourth Movement, in which she was dedicated in fighting for feminism, establishing the journal The Female Bell (Nü jie zhong) and serving as its editor. In 1920, Lao Junzhan joined the Diligent Work–Frugal Study Movement. During her studies in France studied and learnt from Marie Curie. After she returned to China, she engaged in education and continued to have close relationships with Chinese Communist Party members with her husband Xu Deheng, supporting and covering up their revolutionary activities. In the midst of the first anniversary of the end of the Second Sino-Japanese War in 1946, Lao Junzhan and her husband organised and established the Jiusan Society. After the establishment of the People's Republic of China, Lao taught in Renmin University of China's Math School and served as a representative to the Beijing Municipal People's Congress, a member of the Beijing Municipal Committee of the Chinese People's Political Consultative Conference, a member of the National Committee of the Chinese People's Political Consultative Conference, an executive committee member of the All-China Women's Federation, and a member of the Standing Committee of the Jiusan Society.
