= 1830 in China =

- Decades: 1810s; 1820s; 1830s; 1840s; 1850s
- See also: Other events of 1830; History of China • Timeline • Years

Events from the year 1830 in China.

== Incumbents ==
- Daoguang Emperor (10th year)

=== Viceroys ===
- Viceroy of Zhili — Na Yancheng
- Viceroy of Min-Zhe — Sun Erzhun
- Viceroy of Huguang — Songfu then Lu Kun
- Viceroy of Shaan-Gan — Yang Yuchun
- Viceroy of Liangguang — Li Hongbin
- Viceroy of Yun-Gui — Ruan Yuan
- Viceroy of Sichuan — Qishan
- Viceroy of Liangjiang — Jiang Youxian then Tao Zhu

== Establishments ==
- Lukang Ai Gate

== Births ==
- Hu Jiumei
- Su Sanniang
- Pan Zuyin

== Deaths ==
- Li Ruzhen, Chinese novelist and phonologist
