= 1859 in China =

- Decades: 1830s; 1840s; 1850s; 1860s; 1870s
- See also: Other events of 1859; History of China • Timeline • Years

Events from the year 1859 in China.

== Incumbents ==
- Xianfeng Emperor (10th year)

== Events ==
- Nian Rebellion
- Second Opium War
  - Battle of Taku Forts (1859)
- Taiping Rebellion
  - Hong Rengan arrives in Tianjing, reunited with Hong Xiuquan
- Miao Rebellion (1854–1873)
- Amur Annexation
- Panthay Rebellion

== Births ==
- September 16 – Yuan Shikai, president of the Republic of China
