= 1860 in China =

- Decades: 1840s; 1850s; 1860s; 1870s; 1880s
- See also: Other events of 1860; History of China • Timeline • Years

Events from the year 1860 in China.

== Incumbents ==
- Xianfeng Emperor (10th year)

== Events ==
- Nian Rebellion
- Second Opium War
  - Battle of Palikao
  - Battle of Zhangjiawan
  - August 1 — Allied fleet lands at Beitang.
  - August 22 — Battle of Taku Forts (1860), British and French forces capture Taku forts in north China.
  - September 22 — The Xianfeng emperor abandons the capital.
  - October 13 — British and French troops occupy Beijing.
  - October 18 Destruction of the Old Summer Palace
  - October 24 Sino-British Treaty of Beijing signed.
- Taiping Rebellion
  - Battle of Jiangnan (1860)
    - June 2 — Taiping forces under the Loyal King capture Suzhou
  - Taiping forces defeat a Qing army surrounding Tianjing, breaking the siege
  - June–September — Battle of Anqing, Qing forces capture Anqing
  - May — Taiping armies rout imperial siege troops at Nanjing.
  - Issachar Roberts arrives in Nanjing.
  - Frederick Townsend Ward enlists foreigners for rifle corps in Shanghai.
  - Zeng Guofan appointed acting Viceroy of Liangjiang, Jiangxi, Anhui, and Jiangsu; receives full appointment on August 10.
  - July 15 — The Loyal King sends letter stating that the Taiping won't harm foreigners at Shanghai.
  - July 16 — Frederick Townsend Ward's militia captures Songjiang
  - July 28 — Zeng Guofan sets up headquarters in Qimen.
  - July 30 — Taiping forces defeat Frederick Townsend Ward at Qingpu.
  - August 2 — Joseph Edkins and Griffith John arrive in Suzhou to meet Hong Rengan.
  - August 19 — British and French forces attack Taiping rebels at Shanghai.
- Miao Rebellion (1854–73)
- Convention of Peking
  - Amur Annexation, the annexation of the current southeast corner of Siberia into Russia in 1858–1860
- Panthay Rebellion
- Approximate beginning of the Tongzhi Restoration

== Births ==
- Zhu Jiabao
- Gu Zhongchen
- Zheng Xiaoxu

== Deaths ==
- Lam Qua, painter who specialized in Western-style portraits intended largely for Western clients
- Luo Zundian, Qing commander who was forced to commit suicide after losing
- Zhang Guoliang, Qing commander drowned trying to escape in the Jiangnan campaign
