= 1850 in China =

- Decades: 1830s; 1840s; 1850s; 1860s; 1870s
- See also: Other events of 1850; History of China • Timeline • Years

Events from the year 1850 in China.

== Incumbents ==
- Daoguang Emperor (30th year)
- Xianfeng Emperor (1st year)

=== Viceroys ===
- Viceroy of Zhili — Nergingge
- Viceroy of Min-Zhe
  - Liu Yunke
  - Yutai
- Viceroy of Huguang
  - Yutai
- Viceroy of Shaan-Gan — Qishan
- Viceroy of Liangguang — Xu Guangjin
- Viceroy of Yun-Gui
  - Cheng Yucai
  - Wu Wenrong
- Viceroy of Sichuan — Xu Zechun

== Events ==
- 9 March - Xianfeng Emperor succeed Daoguang Emperor as Emperor of the Qing dynasty
- Taiping Rebellion
  - December 1850 - Hong Xiuquan defeats Qing forces sent to quell an uprising in Guangxi
- Admiral Amaral's head returned, after his assassination in 1849, by Edict of Viceroy

=== Ongoing ===
- Shen-kuang-szu Incident (1850–51)

== Births ==
- Qu Hongji, was a politician of the Chinese Qing Dynasty who served in several ministerial positions (d. 1918)
- Tso Ping Lung, 1st officially appointment Chinese consul of Singapore (d. 1924)

== Deaths ==
- February 25 – Daoguang Emperor, 7th Emperor of the Qing Dynasty (b.1782)
- November 22 – Lin Zexu, political philosopher and politician (b.1785)
