= Ma Shenglin =

Hui Jahriyya Sufi rebel

- Born: Yunnan
- Died: 1871
- Allegiance: Pingnan Guo
- Rank: General
- Conflicts: Panthay Rebellion

Ma Shenglin
- Traditional Chinese: 馬聖鱗
- Simplified Chinese: 马圣鳞
Transcriptions
Standard Mandarin
- Hanyu Pinyin: Mǎ Shènglín
other Mandarin
- Xiao'erjing: ﻣَﺎ ﺷْﻊ لٍ

Ma Shenglin was a Hui Jahriyya Sufi rebel who fought against the Qing dynasty in the Panthay Rebellion.

In the late 1860s, when Qing loyalist Muslim General Ma Rulong led the reconquest western Yunnan, Ma Shenglin defended town of Greater Donggou against Ma Rulong's army in a battle of in central Yunnan. Ma Shenglin was a Jahriyya order leader in Yunnan and a rebel commander. Mortar fire killed Ma in 1871.

Ma Shenglin was the great-uncle of Ma Shaowu, a descendant of Ma Mingxin and a relative of Ma Yuanzhang.
