= 1851 in China =

- Decades: 1830s; 1840s; 1850s; 1860s; 1870s
- See also: Other events of 1851; History of China • Timeline • Years

Events from the year 1851 in China.

== Incumbents ==
- Xianfeng Emperor (1st year)

=== Viceroys ===
- Viceroy of Zhili — Nergingge
- Viceroy of Min-Zhe
  - Yutai
  - Ji Zhichang
- Viceroy of Huguang
  - Yutai
- Viceroy of Shaan-Gan
  - Qishan
  - Saying'a (acting)
  - Yutai
  - Šuhingga (acting, then de jure)
- Viceroy of Liangguang — Xu Guangjin
- Viceroy of Yun-Gui
  - Cheng Yucai
  - Wu Wenrong
- Viceroy of Sichuan — Xu Zechun

== Events ==
- Nian Rebellion
  - the Nian begins raiding the grain stores and silver caches of villages.
- Taiping Rebellion
  - Jintian Uprising
- Mujangga dismissed from all government positions
- the first huiguan, the Kong Chow Company emerged seeing that the majority of Chinese already settled in California were connected to six districts collectively called Gangzhou

== Births ==
- Chung On Siew (鄭安壽, 1851 - 1907), emigrated to British Malaya

== Deaths ==
- Chui A-poo (?-1851), hangs himself before the British are able to exile him to Van Diemens Land
