= Zhang Xinshi =

Chinese plant ecologist (1934–2020)

- 张新时
- Born: June 30, 1934; Kaifeng, Henan, China
- Died: September 24, 2020 (aged 86); Seattle, Washington, United States
- Education: Beijing Forestry University; Cornell University
- Spouse: Ci Longjun
- Children: 3
- Scientific career
- Fields: Plant ecology
- Workplaces: Institute of Botany, Chinese Academy of Sciences

Chinese name
- Traditional Chinese: 張新時
- Simplified Chinese: 张新时
Transcriptions
Standard Mandarin
- Hanyu Pinyin: Zhāng Xīnshí

Zhang Xinshi (Chinese: 张新时; June 30, 1934 – September 24, 2020) was a Chinese plant ecologist. He was the founder of China's quantitative vegetation ecology and international information ecology, and established China's first laboratory of quantitative vegetation ecology. He was a member of the 8th, 9th and 10th Standing Committee of the Chinese People's Political Consultative Conference.

== Biography ==
Zhang was born in Kaifeng, Henan, on June 30, 1934, while his ancestral home was in Gaotang County, Shandong. His father Zhang Jingyu was a politician and military officer in the Government of the Republic of China. After graduating from Beijing Forestry University in 1955, he was dispatched to Xinjiang Agricultural University. In 1979 after the reform and opening up, he pursued advanced studies in the United States, earning his doctor's degree from Cornell University.

Zhang returned to China in 1986 and that same year joined the Institute of Botany, Chinese Academy of Sciences. In 1990 he was promoted to become director of the Institute of Botany, Chinese Academy of Sciences, a position he held until 1998. He died of illness in Seattle, United States.

== Personal life ==
Zhang married Ci Longjun (慈龙骏), an expert in desertification control engineering. The couple had three children.

== Honours and awards ==
- 1988 State Natural Science Award (Second Class)
- 1991 Member of Chinese Academy of Sciences (CAS)
- 2006 State Science and Technology Progress Award (Second Class)
- 2011 State Natural Science Award (Second Class)
