= 1853 in China =

- Decades: 1830s; 1840s; 1850s; 1860s; 1870s
- See also: Other events of 1853; History of China • Timeline • Years

Events from the year 1853 in China.

== Incumbents ==
- Xianfeng Emperor (3rd year)

=== Viceroys ===
- Viceroy of Zhili — Nergingge (dismissed), Guiliang

== Events ==
- Nian Rebellion
- Taiping Rebellion
  - March — Battle of Nanjing (1853), Taiping forces capture Nanjing
  - May 8 — Northern Expedition launched with the aim of capturing Beijing
  - May 19 — Western Expedition launched along the Yangtze River
  - A Xiang Army branch led by Guo Songtao retakes Nanchang, Jiangxi from the Taiping forces
- a conflict between Han and Hui miners in Yunnan contributes to the later Panthay Rebellion
- Small Swords Society uprising in Shanghai begins
