= 1827 in China =

- Decades: 1800s; 1810s; 1820s; 1830s; 1840s
- See also: Other events of 1827; History of China • Timeline • Years

Events from the year 1827 in China.

== Incumbents ==
- Daoguang Emperor (7th year)

=== Viceroys ===
- Viceroy of Zhili — Na Yancheng
- Viceroy of Min-Zhe — Sun Erzhun
- Viceroy of Huguang — Songfu
- Viceroy of Shaan-Gan — vacant then Yang Yuchun
- Viceroy of Liangguang — Li Hongbin
- Viceroy of Yun-Gui — Ruan Yuan
- Viceroy of Sichuan — Dai Sanxi
- Viceroy of Liangjiang — Qishan then Jiang Youxian

== Events ==
- Local officials in Guangzhou suggested the government fund the building of seven fast patrol boats designed along the same model as the fast crabs
