= 1849 in China =

- Decades: 1820s; 1830s; 1840s; 1850s; 1860s
- See also: Other events of 1849; History of China • Timeline • Years

Events from the year 1849 in China.

== Incumbents ==
- Daoguang Emperor (29th year)

=== Viceroys ===
- Viceroy of Zhili — Nergingge
- Viceroy of Min-Zhe — Liu Yunke
- Viceroy of Huguang — Yutai
- Viceroy of Shaan-Gan — Qishan (Acting Viceroy)
- Viceroy of Liangguang — Xu Guangjin
- Viceroy of Yun-Gui — Cheng Yucai
- Viceroy of Sichuan:
  - Qishan
  - Xu Zechun
- Viceroy of Liangjiang — Li Xingyuan

== Events ==
- 6 April — Shanghai French Concession created
- Jianmoda Monastery built in modern Qinghai
- August — The Passaleão incident, a conflict between Portugal and China over Macau in August 1849
- 28–29 September — Battle of Tysami, a military engagement involving a warship from the British China Squadron and the Chinese pirates of Chui A-poo

== Births ==
- Lu Zhongyi (18 May 1849 – 26 February 1925) was the seventeenth patriarch of Yiguan Dao
- Hong Tianguifu (23 November 1849 – 18 November 1864), son of Hong Xiuquan, the second and last king of the Heavenly Kingdom of Taiping
- Sir Boshan Wei Yuk, CMG JP (1849 – 16 December 1921) a prominent Hong Kong businessman and member of the Legislative Council of Hong Kong.
- Wong Nai Siong (1849—1924) as a Chinese revolutionary leader and educator from Minqing county in Fuzhou, Fujian province, China.
