= 1828 in China =

- Decades: 1800s; 1810s; 1820s; 1830s; 1840s
- See also: Other events of 1828; History of China • Timeline • Years

Events from the year 1828 in China.

== Incumbents ==
- Daoguang Emperor (8th year)

== Events ==
- Unknown date – Guangdong Pharmacy Store, as predecessor of Watsons a cosmetics and pharmacy retailer around Southeast Asia, was founded.

== Establishments ==
- Guangyun Temple is a Buddhist temple located in Cangyuan Va Autonomous County of Yunnan, China. first built in 1828 by the Yunnan government
