= 1858 in China =

- Decades: 1830s; 1840s; 1850s; 1860s; 1870s
- See also: Other events of 1858; History of China • Timeline • Years

Events from the year 1858 in China.

== Incumbents ==
- Xianfeng Emperor (9th year)

== Events ==
- Nian Rebellion
- Second Opium War
- Taiping Rebellion
  - Battle of Sanhe
- Miao Rebellion (1854–73)
- Amur Annexation
  - Treaty of Aigun, unequal treaty between the Russian Empire, and the empire of the Qing Dynasty that reversing the Treaty of Nerchinsk (1689) by transferring the land between the Stanovoy Mountains and the Amur River from China (Qing Empire) to the Russian Empire establishing much of the modern border between the Russian Far East and Manchuria (the original homeland of the Manchu people and the Qing Dynasty), which is now known as Northeast China.
- Panthay Rebellion
- Loke Yew leaves China for British Malaya
- Opium is legalized

== Deaths ==
- Li Xubin, Xiang Army commander killed in the Battle of Sanhe
