= Institute of Botany =

Chinese research institution

Institute of Botany, Chinese Academy of Sciences
- 中国科学院植物研究所 (pinyin: Zhōngguó Kēxuéyuàn Zhíwù Yánjiūsuǒ)

Brief Introduction
- Established: 1928
- Type: Public
- President: Wang Xiaoquan (汪小全)
- Academic staff: 149
- Postgraduates: 604
- Area: 74 hectares
- Location: Haidian District, Beijing, China
- Affiliations: Chinese Academy of Sciences (CAS); University of Chinese Academy of Sciences (UCAS)
- Student organization: Graduate Student Union of IB-CAS
- Representative color: IB-CAS Green
- Website; English：english.ib.cas.cn; Chinese：www.ibcas.ac.cn

The Institute of Botany, Chinese Academy of Sciences (IB-CAS; Chinese: 中国科学院植物研究所; pinyin: Zhōngguó Kēxuéyuàn Zhíwù Yánjiūsuǒ) is one of the oldest comprehensive research institutions in China. It has led the development of plant science in China since its establishment in 1928. The institute has received three first-level National Natural Science Awards, as well as more than 160 awards at the national and provincial level. With a focus on integrative plant biology, IB-CAS conducts innovative research at the molecular, cellular, physiological, ecological and landscape levels, and develops applications to benefit agriculture and the environment. Its five key research areas are systematic and evolutionary botany, vegetation and environmental change, plant molecular physiology and development, photosynthesis, and the sustainable use of plant resources.

== Departments ==
IB-CAS comprises five research units: the National Key Laboratory of Systematic and Evolutionary Botany, the National Key Laboratory of Vegetation and Environmental Change, the CAS Key Laboratory of Molecular Physiology, the CAS Key Laboratory of Photobiology and the CAS Key Laboratory of Plant Resources. In addition, it is also home to the largest herbarium in Asia, 10 field stations, the Beijing Botanical Garden and the Hua Xi Subalpine Botanical Garden in Sichuan Province. IBCAS’s herbarium collections comprise 2.63 million specimens, representing fossils, seed collections, liverworts, hornworts, mosses, lycophytes, ferns, gymnosperms and angiosperms.

== Staff and Students ==
IB-CAS has a staff of almost 700 including 84 professors, of whom five are CAS academicians, and 131 associate professors and senior technicians. IB-CAS also has 636 graduate students and 55 postdoctoral fellows.

IB-CAS was one of the first Chinese institutions authorized to confer master's degrees in botany, developmental biology, ecology, cell biology and bioengineering, and Ph.D. degrees in botany, developmental biology and ecology. The institute has postdoctoral research programs in both biology and ecology. So far, over 1,500 students have graduated from the institute.

== Publication and Corporation ==
IB-CAS also publishes seven journals. Among them, the Journal of Integrative Plant Biology, Journal of Systematics and Evolution and Journal of Plant Ecology are published in English and indexed by SCI. Including the journal Biodiversity Science, previously (Chinese Biodiversity) since 1993.

IB-CAS has developed substantive cooperation with researchers and organizations around the world. IB-CAS has been a key player in a number of important international cooperation projects in various fields of plant science. Flora of China, jointly completed by botanists from China, the United States and other countries, is the largest such English compilation in the world. Since 2011, the institute has launched a new international project, Flora of the Pan-Himalaya, which is expected to address several key scientific issues regarding this international hotspot of plant taxonomy. The project has received support from the Chinese Ministry of Science and Technology, the National Natural Science Foundation of China and CAS. In 2012, IB-CAS was named a National Base for International Cooperation.
