= Zhu Qihe =

Chinese chemist

- 朱起鹤
- Born: 12 July 1924; Beijing, China
- Died: 20 February 2024 (aged 99); Beijing, China
- Education: National Central University; University of California, Berkeley
- Scientific career
- Fields: Physical chemistry
- Workplaces: Harbin Institute of Military Engineering (1952–1978); Institute of High Energy Physics, Chinese Academy of Sciences (1978–1981); Institute of Chemistry, Chinese Academy of Sciences (1981–2024)

Chinese name
- Simplified Chinese: 朱起鹤
- Traditional Chinese: 朱起鶴
Transcriptions
Standard Mandarin
- Hanyu Pinyin: Zhū Qǐhè

Zhu Qihe (Chinese: 朱起鹤; 12 July 1924 – 20 February 2024) was a Chinese physical chemist, and an academician of the Chinese Academy of Sciences. He was a member of the Chinese Communist Party (CCP).

== Biography ==
Zhu was born in Beijing, on 12 July 1924, to Zhu Jisheng (1894–1972), an industrialist. He attended Tianjin Yaohua High School. He graduated from the Department of Chemical Engineering, National Central University in 1947 before gaining a doctor's degree from the University of California, Berkeley under direction of William Francis Giauque.

Zhu returned to China in 1951 and that same year joined the faculty of the Department of Chemistry at Yenching University and then Peking University. He was transferred to Harbin Institute of Military Engineering (now National University of Defense Technology) in 1952, where he worked for 26 years. In 1978, he moved to the Institute of High Energy Physics, responsible for research projects such as superconducting magnets, superconducting microwave cavities, and laser acceleration. In 1981, he became professor in the Institute of Chemistry of the Chinese Academy of Sciences, where he mainly focused on the establishment of the molecular reaction dynamics laboratory.

His primary research focus was on molecular reaction dynamics. He successfully developed six large-scale experiments utilizing molecular beams and lasers, enabling diverse scientific research endeavors. In the realm of molecular photolysis, he clarified the photodissociation mechanisms of molecules such as alkyl iodides, halogenated olefins, and ketones, proposing microscopic reaction mechanisms. In cluster studies, he made groundbreaking discoveries of a new class of hydrogen-containing carbon clusters, positing their tubular structures. Additionally, he identified a series of binary clusters comprising metals and sulfur, elucidating their composition patterns, stability, photodissociation behaviors, and the kinetics of cluster formation.

On 20 February 2024, he died of an illness in Beijing, at the age of 99.

== Honours and awards ==
- 1995 Member of the Chinese Academy of Sciences (CAS)
