= Chung On Siew =

Chinese capitalist and inventor

- Born: 1851
- Died: December 25, 1907 (aged 55–56)

Chung On Siew (simplified Chinese: 郑安寿; traditional Chinese: 鄭安壽; pinyin: Zhèng Ānshòu; 1851 – 25 December 1907) was a Chinese capitalist, inventor and philanthropist.

He moved to British Malaya and became a pioneer in the tin mining, rubber and property development industries. He is noted for the discovery of the hydraulic mining method on his alluvial hill lands and as a wise investor. One of his largest tin mines employed over 400 men. His tin mines were managed by European engineer, A. Hamilton. He has a street named after him in the tin mining town of Ipoh, Perak. He contributed extensively to the development of infrastructure in the town. An ibis Styles hotel was constructed on the street after the demolition of his prewar shophouses in 2013.

According to Arnold Wright, he was one of the biggest owners with many rubber plantations and tin mines in South East Asia. Based on the Singapore Straits Times, he acquired many other properties in China and Hong Kong. He retired back to China in 1905 where he died in 1907.
