= Battle of Macao Fort =

Coordinates: 23°4′12″N 113°15′29″E

- Part of the Second Opium War
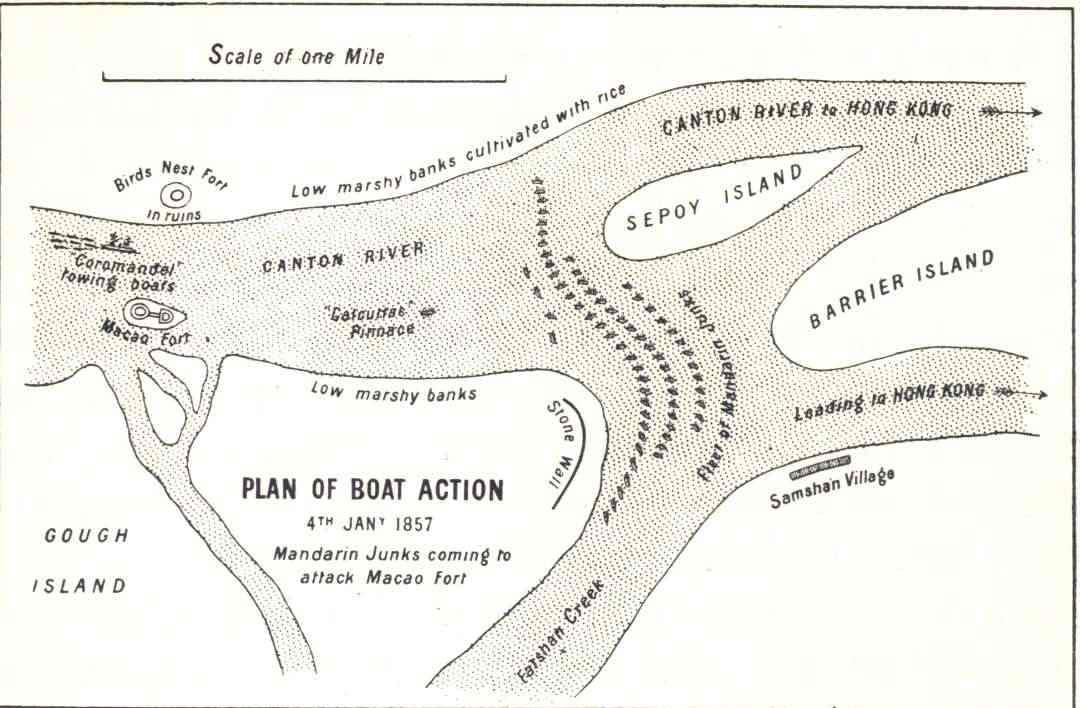
- Map of the battle
Date	4 January 1857
Location	Pearl River, Guangdong, China
Result	Inconclusive

Belligerents
United Kingdom	Qing China

Commanders and leaders
Michael Seymour	Ye Mingchen

Strength
4 sloops 3 pinnaces 1 gig 1 cutter	20 junks (many armed with stinkpots); 30+ row boats

Casualties and losses
1 killed 6 wounded	Unknown

The Battle of Macao Fort was fought between British and Chinese forces in the Pearl River, Guangdong, China on 4 January 1857 during the Second Opium War. Macao Fort was located on an islet about 3 miles (4.8 kilometres) south of Canton (Guangzhou).

== Gallery ==
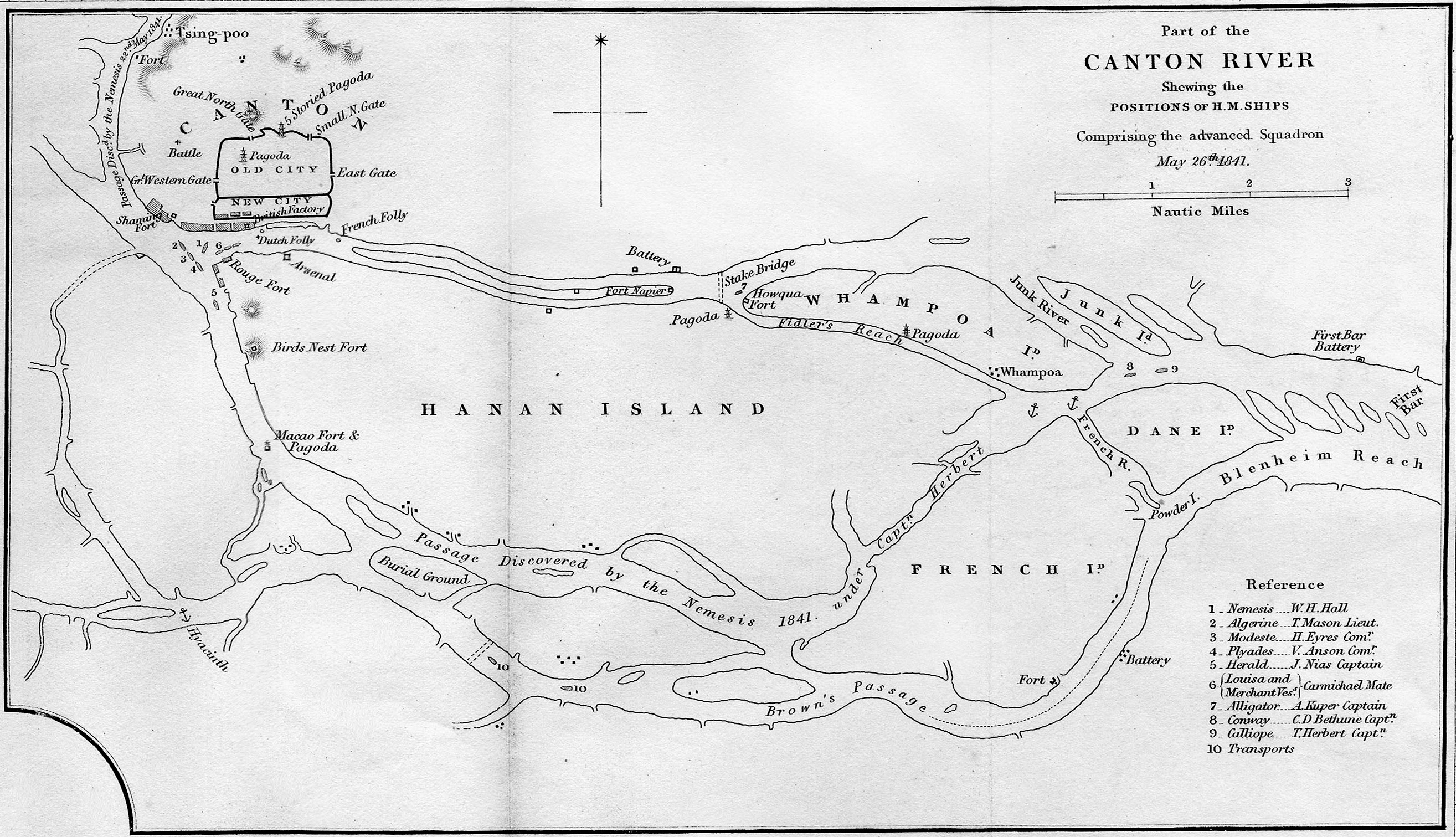
Larger map of the Canton River, showing Macao Fort

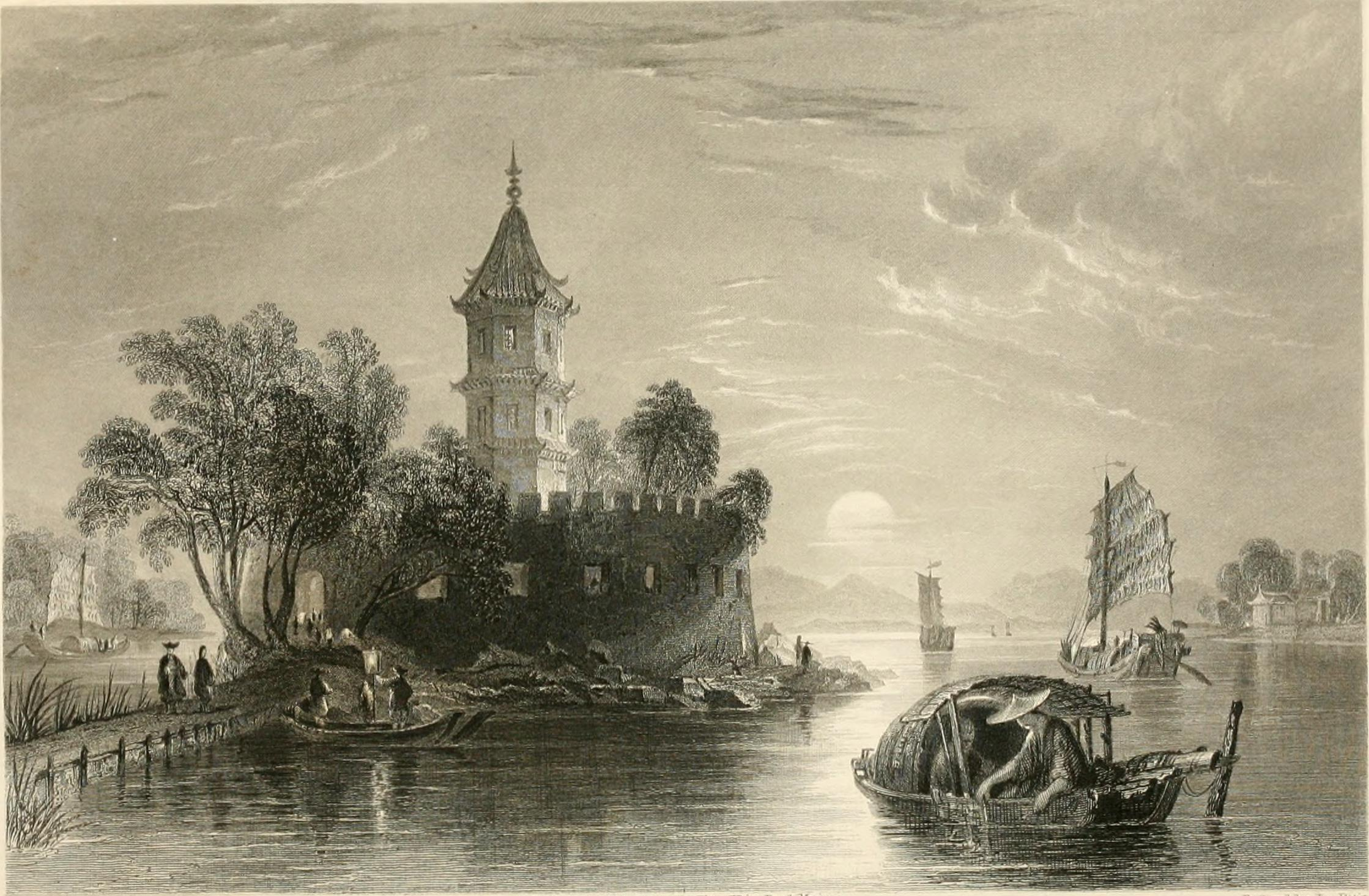
Macao Fort, c. 1841

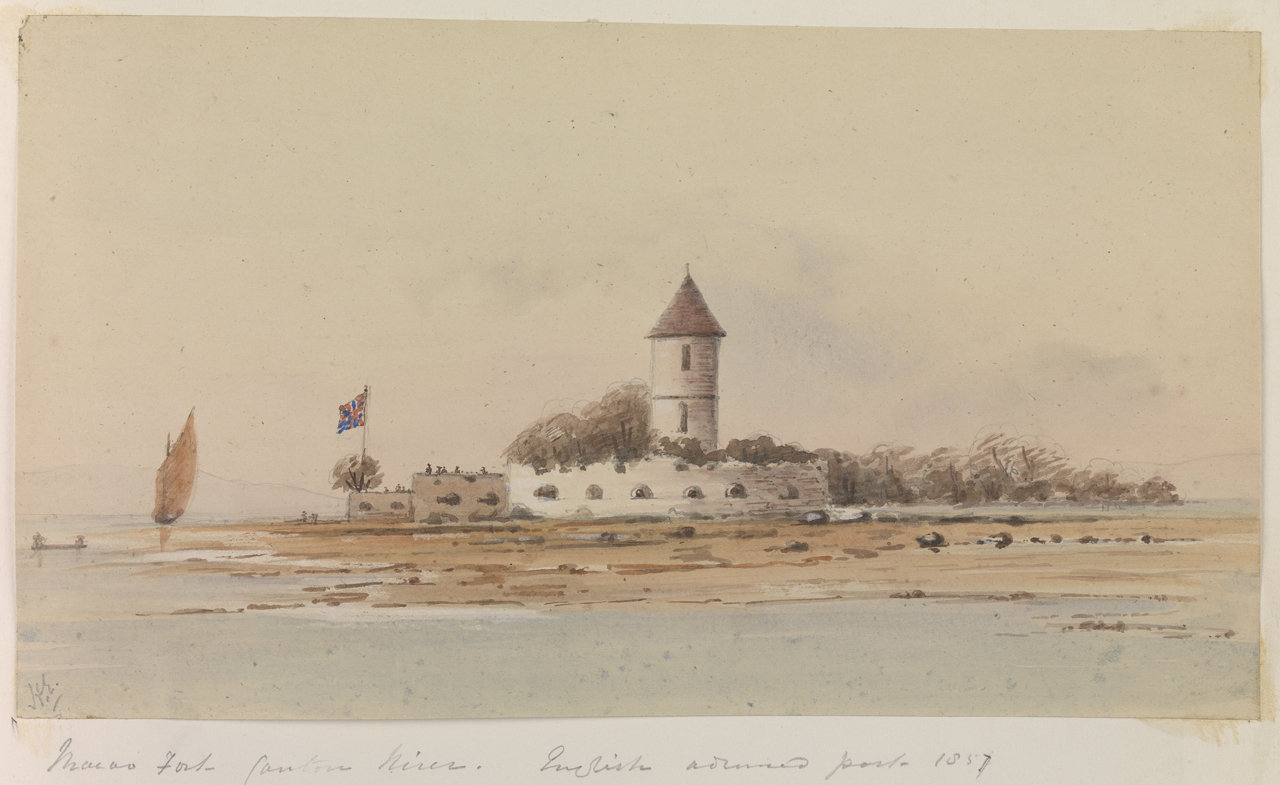
The Union Jack on the fort, 1857

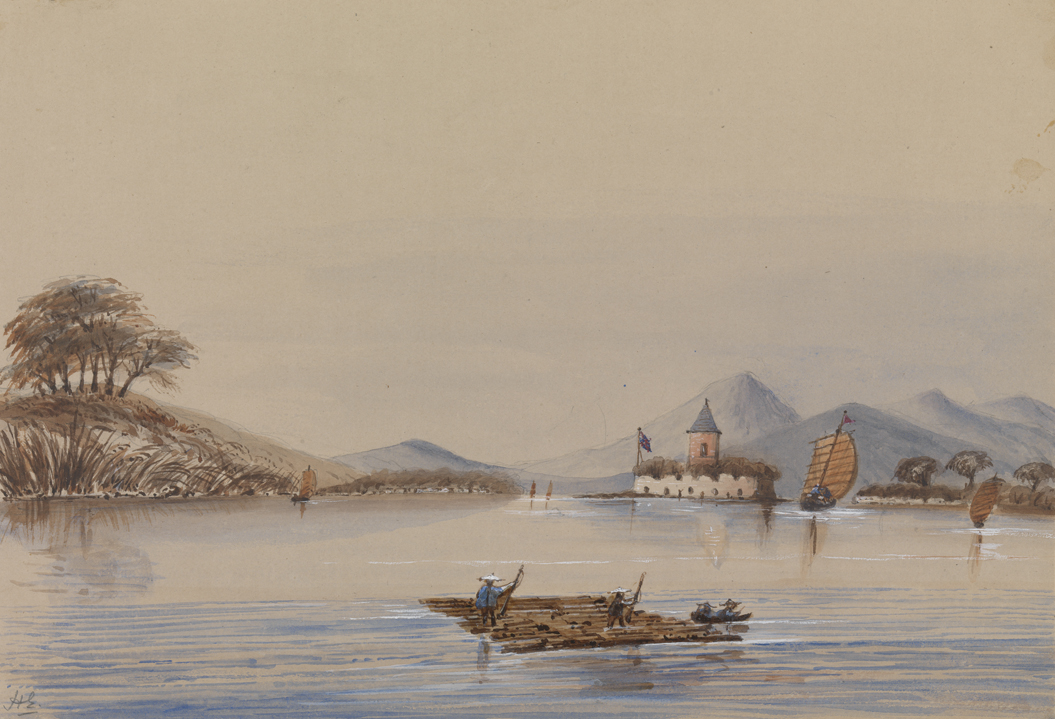
Watercolour sketch of the fort, 1858
