= Jianmoda Monastery =

Jianmoda Monastery is a Tibetan Buddhist monastery of the Jonang sect in the Golog Tibetan Autonomous Prefecture of Qinghai province, China. It is located on the slope of the Yamrixumo Mountain in the Jianmo River Valley, in Sogrima Township, 87 km west of Chorzhi County's Zhiqensomdor Township. The Zamda River is located to the left of the monastery and the Jianmo River is located in front.

The monastery was built in 1849, and has a monk population of about 200, including 100 resident monks. The monastery has one sutra hall, one mediation hall, and 20 monk dormitories.
