= 1852 in China =

- Decades: 1830s; 1840s; 1850s; 1860s; 1870s
- See also: Other events of 1852; History of China • Timeline • Years

Events from the year 1852 in China.

== Incumbents ==
- Xianfeng Emperor (2nd year)

=== Viceroys ===
- Viceroy of Zhili — Nergingge
- Viceroy of Min-Zhe
  - Yutai
  - Ji Zhichang
- Viceroy of Huguang
  - Yutai
- Viceroy of Shaan-Gan
  - Qishan
  - Saying'a (acting)
  - Yutai
  - Šuhingga (acting, then de jure)
- Viceroy of Liangguang — Xu Guangjin
- Viceroy of Yun-Gui
  - Cheng Yucai
  - Wu Wenrong
- Viceroy of Sichuan — Xu Zechun

== Events ==
- Second Opium War
- Taiping Rebellion
  - December — Zeng Guofan appointed commissioner of militia organization for Central China
