= Tian Wenlie =

Chinese politician (1858-1924)

Tian Wenlie (Chinese: 田文烈; November 9, 1858 – November 12, 1924) was a Chinese politician of the late Qing Dynasty and early Republican period, military governor of Henan province and supporter of Yuan Shikai's restoration of the monarchy. He was born in Hanyang, Hubei (now Hanyang District, Wuhan) and died in Beijing.

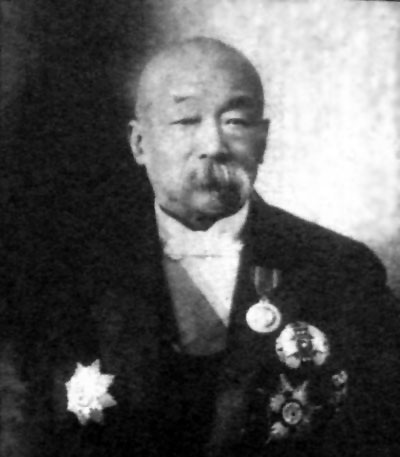

== Awards and decorations ==
Order of Rank and Merit
Order of the Golden Grain
