= 1854 in China =

- Decades: 1830s; 1840s; 1850s; 1860s; 1870s
- See also: Other events of 1854; History of China • Timeline • Years

Events from the year 1854 in China.

== Incumbents ==
- Xianfeng Emperor (4th year)

=== Viceroys ===
- Viceroy of Zhili — Guiliang
- Viceroy of Min-Zhe — Wang Yide
- Viceroy of Huguang — Wu Wenrong then Taiyong then Yang Pei
- Viceroy of Shaan-Gan — Yi Tang
- Viceroy of Liangguang — Ye Mingchen
- Viceroy of Yun-Gui — Wu Raodian then Wu Zhenyu
- Viceroy of Sichuan — Yurui then Huang Zonghan
- Viceroy of Liangjiang — Yiliang

== Events ==
- Nian Rebellion
- Taiping Rebellion
- Miao Rebellion (1854–73)
- Red Turban Rebellion (1854–1856)
- the first Chinese laborers arrive in Jamaica
