= Bao Shichen =

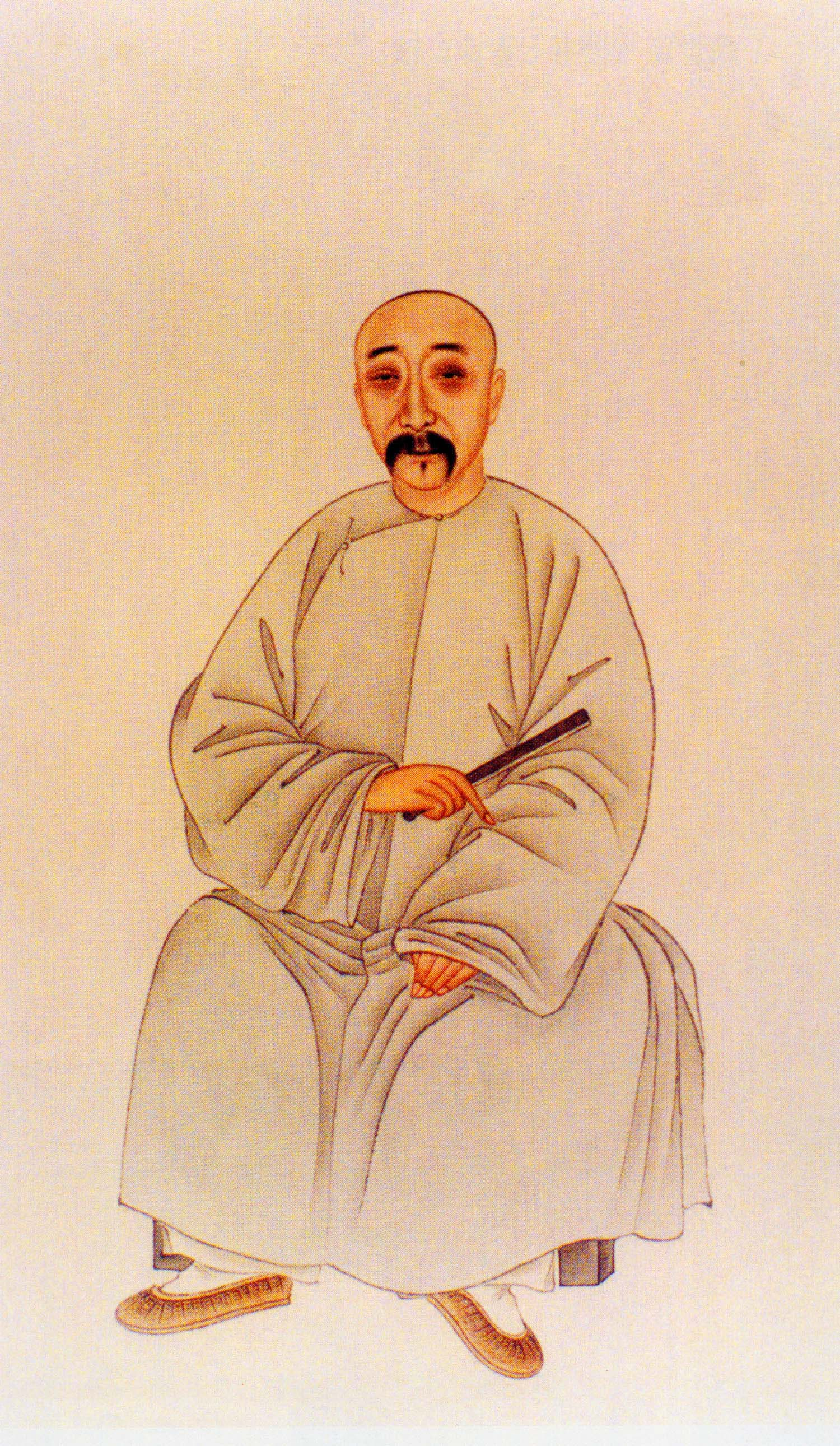
Portrait of Bao Shichen

Bao Shichen (Chinese: 包世臣; 1775–1855) was a calligrapher and reformist scholar in the early nineteenth century. Under the Qing administration, Bao made numerous important suggestions regarding the areas of military affairs, laws and politics, the grain tribute system, the salt monopoly, and the improvement of agricultural practice.

== Life ==
Bao Shichen grew up during the reign Jiaqing, in a low-class intellectual family, and had a fair amount of education. He was a son of a low-ranking Green Standard Army officer, and helped his father to suppress the Lin Shuangwen rebellion. When his father was ill, he brought his father home in Anhui province. While taking care of his father by himself, Bao rented a land to farm, acquiring food this way, and sold vegetables and fruits for money. After his father died, Bao used his paternal connections to get a commander position in leading the White Lotus campaigns in the northwest.

Throughout his life, Bao had experienced thirteen failures to pass the highest level of the civil service examination, and therefore did not obtain a formal official position until his late years with the help of friends.

He died in 1855, on the road when he fled from the Taiping Rebellion.

Bao had one son and one daughter. His son Bao Cheng published his father's works several times after his death.

== Major works and reputation ==
Bao Shichen was a leading figure in 'statecraft' scholarship, an informal movement of Confucians that published tracts on real problems facing early 19th century China. His writings owed much to the scholarship of Hong Liangji who had campaigned against the widespread corruption under the Qianlong Emperor. In 1801, Bao wrote an essay Shuochu (说储, On Wealth) to list his ambitious thoughts on the reforms that could help the Qing Empire to regain its political power and became prosperous again. He believed in the theory of "agriculture first", that agriculture is paramount for achieving prosperity in the country, and he also put down his ideas on agrarian policy in an essay Random notes from the year 1820 (Gengchen zazhu). In 1820s–30s, Bao did a considerable amount of work on the reforms of the Grain Tribute Administration and the Liang-Huai Salt Administration.

He advocated large-scale institutional reforms, such as getting rid of the Grand Council to improve administrational efficiency, allowing the court to consult the literati, giving farmers low-gentry degrees based on their agricultural technique, and reconsolidating the baojia (保甲) system.

However, Bao's reputation is earned mostly for being a calligrapher and historian of calligraphy. He wrote a book Yizhou Shuangji (艺舟双楫, Two Oars for the Boat of Art) in 1844 on Wei style character formation. Bao was also known in the late Qing to be an anti-foreign patriot and an extreme hardliner in the opium debates and the first Anglo-Chinese war of 1839–42. Even in China today, Bao Shichen is well known as an anti-foreign-capitalist advocate. He deeply criticized the Opium War and exposed the judicial darkness during the war.

In his late years, Bao collected and compiled all his written works into one book titles Anwu Sizhong (安吴四种, Four Categories of Anwu).

== Criticizing the opium trade ==
Bao believed that there were three wastages: tobacco, wine and opium. Growing luxury crops like grain for distilling alcohol, or tobacco, was – according to Bao – a waste of land, labor and fertilizer that could be better used to grow food. Opium was a different problem in Bao's mind, since it was imported and meant that Chinese wealth was transferred to foreign hands. Therefore, in 1801, he advocated closing down the entire foreign trade and expelling the foreign merchants permanently from Canton.

In Bao's argument on the opium trade, he suggested that a large number of silver flowing out of China and the large amount of cash transaction caused the silver money to become more valuable while devaluing the copper money. This directly affected the poorer community and made their life miserable.
