= Li Donghai =

Traditional Chinese medicine practitioner

Li Donghai (李東海; 1857–1938) was a traditional Chinese medicine practitioner during the late Qing Dynasty and Republic era. He was born in Wenjiang District, Chengdu. When the 1881–96 cholera pandemic came to his hometown, he treated more than 100 patients per day, charging no fees for either his services or medicines to indigent patients.
