= Huang Hongjia =

Chinese scientist (1924–2021)

Huang Hongjia (Chinese: 黄宏嘉; 5 August 1924 – 22 September 2021) was a Chinese scientist. He was an academician of the Chinese Academy of Sciences (CAS), and a professor at Shanghai University.

== Life and career ==
Huang developed coupling wave theory in the field of microwave theory. He led a research team that successfully developed single-mode optical fibers in 1980.

He died on 22 September 2021, at the age of 97.

== Bibliography ==
- "Coupling Mode and Imperfect Waveguide", New York Institute of Technology (thesis), 1981.
- "Coupled Mode Theory", 1984.
- "Microwave approach to highly-irregular fiber optics", Wiley and Sons, 1997.
