= Yan Jinxuan =

Chinese composer

Yan Jinxuan (simplified Chinese: 严金萱; traditional Chinese: 嚴金萱; pinyin: Yán Jīnxuān) (21 May 1924 – 20 November 2014) was a Chinese composer.

She was best known for composing the music to the opera and ballet, The White Haired Girl. The opera was first performed in 1945. Yan composed a ballet with music adapted from the opera. The eight-act ballet premiered in 1965, performed by the Shanghai Dance Academy (now known as the Shanghai Ballet Company).

Yan died in November 2014 at the age of 94.
