= Qiling =

Coordinates: 24.0863°N 115.4512°E

- Simplified Chinese: 岐岭镇
Transcriptions
Standard Mandarin
- Hanyu Pinyin: Qílǐng Zhèn

Qiling is a town under the jurisdiction of Wuhua County, Meizhou City, Guangdong Province, southern China.

== See also ==
- List of township-level divisions of Guangdong
