= Ma Rulong (Qing general) =

- Born: Yunnan
- Military career
- Allegiance: Qing dynasty
- Service years: 1856–his death
- Rank: General
- Nickname: Marshal Ma
- Conflicts: Panthay Rebellion

Ma Rulong
- Traditional Chinese: 馬如龍
- Simplified Chinese: 马如龙
Transcriptions
Standard Mandarin
- Hanyu Pinyin: Mǎ Rúlóng
- Wade–Giles: Ma Ju-lung
other Mandarin
- Xiao'erjing: ﻣَﺎ ژُﻮْ ﻟْﻮ

Ma Rulong (Ma Ju-lung in Wade Giles) was a Chinese Muslim who originally rebelled against the Qing dynasty along with Du Wenxiu in the Panthay Rebellion. He later defected to the Qing side. After officially surrendering in 1862 his forces effectively occupied the capital of Yunnan. He then helped the Qing forces crush his fellow Muslim rebels, and defeated them. He was known by the name of Marshal Ma to Europeans and achieved almost total control in Yunnan province. He was the most powerful military official in the province after the war.

Du Wenxiu was fought against by the defector to the Qing Ma Rulong.

General Ma Yu-kun, who fought against Japanese forces in the First Sino-Japanese War and against foreigners in the Boxer Rebellion was believed to be Ma Rulong's son by Europeans.

== Relationship with Ma Dexin ==
The prominent Hui scholar Ma Dexin was respected by both Du Wenxiu & Ma Rulong as a spiritual leader. In 1860; Ma Dexin sent Ma Rulong with forces to help Du Wenxiu fight the Qing; assuring him that:

"I have already secretly ordered my disciples [mensheng] Ma [Rulong] as the Grand Commander of Three Directions, with Ma Rong as second in command . . . to launch a rearguard attack from their base in Yimen."

Ma Rulong studied and learned Arabic under Ma Dexin. Ma Dexin opposed Ma Rulong's acceptance of the Qing policy of "using Hui to fight other Hui".

== Surrender to the Qing ==
There is evidence that Ma Dexin, Ma Rulong & the Hui forces with them only pretended to surrender (in 1862) in order to gain access to the city of Kunming, capital of Yunnan. Even after their supposed capitulation to the Qing; Ma Rulong continued to issue proclamations using his seal "Generalissimo of the Three Directions" while Ma Dexin refused to accept the Civil title granted to him; not wanting to be associated with the Qing regime. The Hui rebels taunted the Hui who hadn't joined the rebellion as being fake Hui (jia Huizi). Taiwanese researcher Li Shoukong asserts that in responding to the Qing offer for surrender; Ma Rulong acted hastily with no plan or thought other than to gain access to the Walled city of Kunming. Many Hui rebels had employed a similar tactic in the early years of the rebellion.

To test his loyalty Ma Rulong was sent to pacify the disgruntled magistrate of Lin'an (in Southern Yunnan). A few weeks after Ma Rulong left the city; rebel forces led by Ma Rong and Ma Liansheng stormed Kunming and captured it. Ma Rulong's forces had come to believe that he could no longer be trusted to achieve their goal of uniting under a single rebel government. Seeking to join Du Wenxiu and unite in opposition to the Qing; the Hui raised the white banner of the Pingnan State, dropped regional references and began to refer to themselves from this point on as Muslims. In 1863 Ma Dexin declared himself "King-Who-Pacifies-the-South (Pingnan Wang)", seized the official seals & stopped using the Qing reign year when dating documents. Ma Dexin hoped to keep the rebel forces united under him until he could hand over control to Du Wenxiu.

Ma Rulong immediately rushed back to Kunming, His former followers rebuked him from the city walls and told him that "If you only crave to be an official with no thought for your fellow Muslims, you should return to [your home in] Guanyi." Ma Rulong attacked the city along with Qing forces; ordered Ma Dexin to give up his seals of office & placed him under house arrest.

=== Reason's for Ma's unpopularity ===
The Hui rebels viewed Ma Rulong as someone who had betrayed the anti-Qing cause, and this generated widespread resentment among his followers.
