= Hu Jiumei =

Chinese rebel and one of the "Three Hu's"

Hu Jiumei (1830–1856) was a Chinese rebel during the Taiping Rebellion. A leading follower of Hong Xiuquan, she was known as one of the "Three Hu's".
