= Phanthog =

Tibetan mountaineer

Personal information
- Nationality: Chinese
- Born: 1939 Gongbo'gyamda County, Nyingchi, Tibet
- Died: March 31, 2014 (aged 74-75) Wuxi, Jiangsu

Climbing career
- Known for: First woman to summit Mount Everest via North Face route
- Updated on July 11, 2016

Phanthog, also known as Phantog (Tibetan: ཕན་ཐོགས་, Wylie: phan-thogs) and Pan Duo (Chinese: 潘多), was a Tibetan mountaineer. She is known for being the first woman to summit Mount Everest via its North Face route, the first Chinese woman to summit Everest, and the second woman to reach the summit, after Junko Tabei.

== Biography ==
Phanthog was born in 1939 into a serf family in rural Tibet. After her father died when she was eight, she was forced to help her mother support the family by working long days performing backbreaking manual labor.

While working in a factory, Phanthog was chosen to be part of the Chinese female mountaineering team at the age of 20 because of her excellent physical condition. Her 1959 ascent of Muztagh Ata in Xinjiang, with an elevation of 7,509 meters (24,636 ft), broke the record for the highest altitude reached by a female mountaineer.

After summiting Everest in 1975, Phanthog served as a deputy in the National People's Congress for five terms and became vice director of the Wuxi Sports Administration in 1981. She returned to Everest in 2008 at the age of 70 by hiking to Everest Base Camp to celebrate the 2008 Summer Olympics in Beijing. She was also one of eight former athletes chosen that year to carry the Olympic flag into the Olympics opening ceremony. In 2009, she was honored by China's State General Administration of Sports as one of the 60 most influential Chinese athletes since the founding of the People's Republic of China in 1949.

She died on March 31, 2014, at the age of 75 due to complications related to diabetes.

== 1975 Everest climb ==
Alongside eight other members of a Chinese-Tibetan expedition, Phanthog summited Mount Everest on May 27, 1975. She became the second woman to successfully climb Everest, reaching the summit only 11 days after Junko Tabei's ascent via the southeast ridge route, and the first woman to climb it from the Tibetan side.

The nine summiters were part of an 18-person "victory team," of which Phanthog was deputy leader, that had set out from Everest Base Camp 10 days prior. Although two other women had climbed to 8,300 meters (27,200 ft), they began suffering from altitude sickness and had to be evacuated (along with seven men), leaving Phanthog as the only woman remaining in the team.

The team was at the summit of Everest for 70 minutes. While at the top, Phanthog spent seven minutes performing an ECG test as a medical experiment. Lead I of her test, which showed nothing unusual, was then sent to base camp via telemetry.

Phanthog lost three of her toes to frostbite as a result of the climb. She recognized the example that she set for women and for female mountaineers, later saying: "Chinese women have a strong will; difficulties can't stop us. We climbed the highest peak in the world; we really hold up half the sky."

== Personal life ==
Phanthog was married to Deng Jiashan, the political commissar of the Chinese national mountaineering team and later a middle school headmaster in Wuxi. Her husband accompanied her on the 1975 Everest expedition, although he did not reach the summit. The couple had three children.

== See also ==
- List of 20th-century summiters of Mount Everest
