= Lao Chongguang =

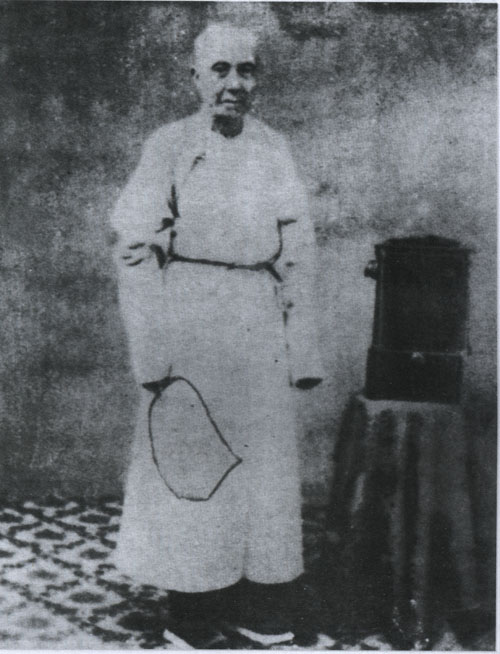

Viceroy of Liangguang
- In office 1859–1862
- Preceded by: Wang Qingyun
- Succeeded by: Liu Changyou

Personal details
- Died: 1867
- Education: Jinshi degree in the Imperial Examination
- Occupation: Politician

Lao Chongguang (simplified Chinese: 劳崇光; traditional Chinese: 勞崇光; pinyin: Láo Chóngguāng; 1802 – 1867) was a Chinese official during the Qing dynasty and a native of Changsha County, Changsha, Hunan.

== Personal life ==
He is the grandfather of Lao Sze-Kwang.

== Political career ==
Lao Chongguang was considered an eminent official, as he had scored impressively high on the jinshi, the imperial examination. On October 7, 1859, Lao Chongguang was appointed governor general of Liangguang. In March 1860, Lao met with Harry Smith Parkes, the British consul in Guangzhou, and leased Kowloon and Stonecutters Island to the United Kingdom.

== See also ==
- Convention for the Extension of Hong Kong Territory
- Zhang GuoLiang

Government offices
Preceded by Wang Qingyun	Viceroy of Liangguang; 1859-1862	Succeeded by Liu Changyou
Preceded by	Viceroy of Yun-Gui; 1863-1867	Succeeded by
