= Luo Bingzhang =

Chinese military general (1793-1867)

First Class adaha hafan Luo Bingzhang
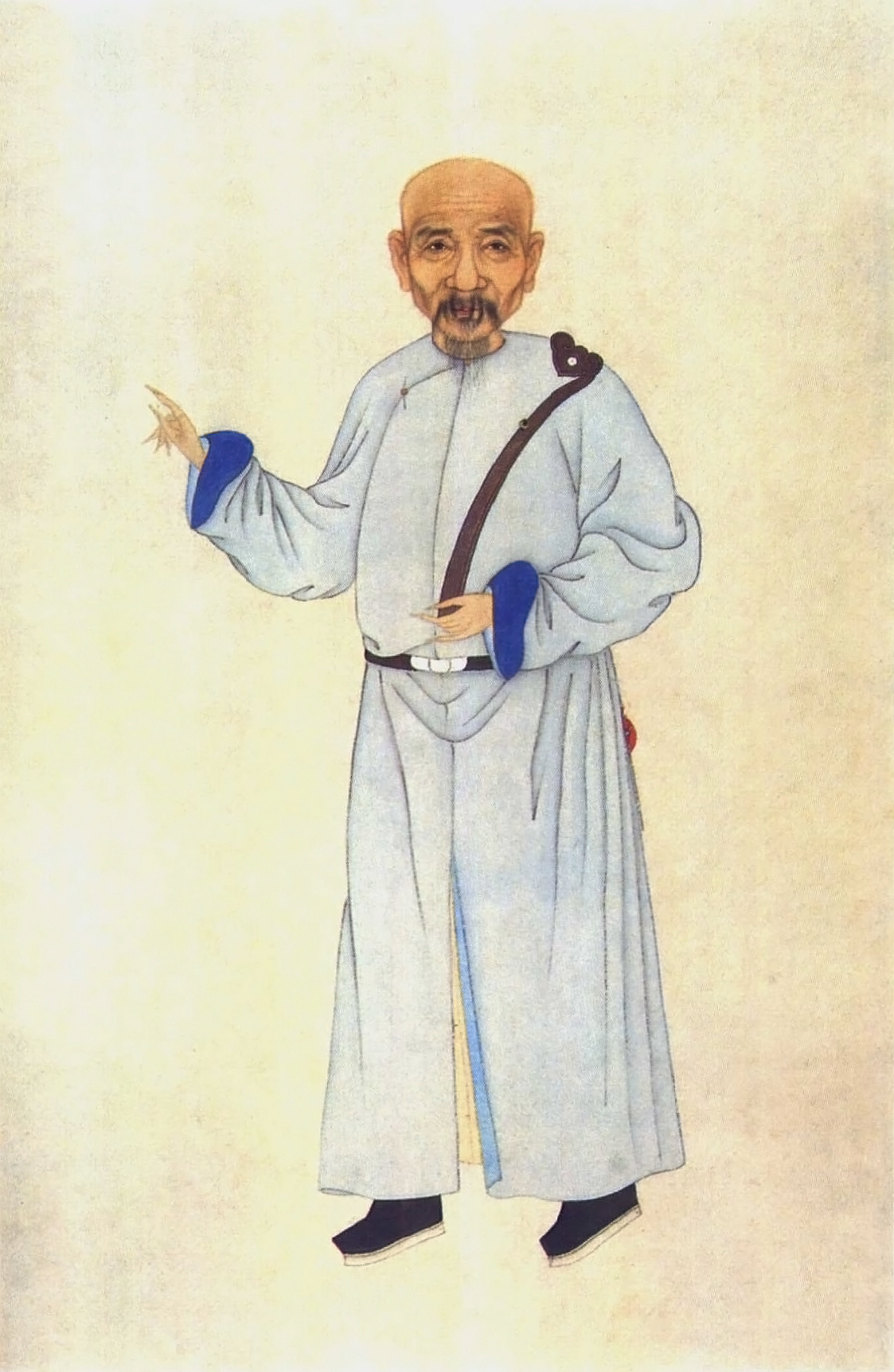

Assistant Grand Secretary
- In office 1867–1867

Viceroy of Sichuan
- In office 1860–1867
- Preceded by: Chongshi
- Succeeded by: Wu Tang

Governor of Hunan
- In office 1853–1860
- Preceded by: Pan Yi
- Succeeded by: Zhai Gao
- In office 1850–1852
- Preceded by: Feng Dexin
- Succeeded by: Zhang Liangji

Personal details
- Born: 9 January 1793 Hua County, Kwangtung, Qing China
- Died: 1 September 1867 (aged 74) Chengdu, Sichuan, Qing China
- Education: Jinshi degree in the Imperial Examination
- Occupation: Statesman, general, scholar

Military service
- Allegiance: Qing dynasty
- Branch/service: Xiang Army
- Battles/wars: Taiping Rebellion

Chinese name
- Traditional Chinese: 駱秉章
- Simplified Chinese: 骆秉章
Transcriptions
Standard Mandarin
- Hanyu Pinyin: Luò Bǐngzhāng
- Wade–Giles: Lo^{4} Ping^{3}-chang^{1}
Hakka
- Romanization: Log^{6} Bin^{3}-zong^{1}
- Pha̍k-fa-sṳ: Lo̍k Pín-chông
Yue: Cantonese
- Jyutping: Lok^{3} Bing^{2}-zoeng^{1}

Birth name
- Traditional Chinese: 駱俊
- Simplified Chinese: 骆俊
Transcriptions
Standard Mandarin
- Hanyu Pinyin: Luò Jùn
- Wade–Giles: Lo^{4} Chün^{4}
Hakka
- Romanization: Log^{6} Zun^{4}
- Pha̍k-fa-sṳ: Lo̍k Chun
Yue: Cantonese
- Jyutping: Lok^{3} Zeon^{3}

Courtesy name
- Traditional Chinese: 籲門
- Simplified Chinese: 吁门
Transcriptions
Standard Mandarin
- Hanyu Pinyin: Yù Mén
- Wade–Giles: Yü^{4} Men^{2}
Hakka
- Romanization: Yog^{6} Mun^{2}
- Pha̍k-fa-sṳ: Io̍k Mùn
Yue: Cantonese
- Jyutping: Jyu^{6} Mun^{4}

Art name
- Traditional Chinese: 儒齋
- Simplified Chinese: 儒斋
Transcriptions
Standard Mandarin
- Hanyu Pinyin: Rú Zhāi
- Wade–Giles: Ju^{2} Chai^{1}
Hakka
- Romanization: Yi^{2} Zai^{1}
- Pha̍k-fa-sṳ: Yì Châi
Yue: Cantonese
- Jyutping: Jyu^{4} Zaai^{1}

Posthumous name
- Chinese: 文忠
Transcriptions
Standard Mandarin
- Hanyu Pinyin: Wén Zhōng
- Wade–Giles: Wen^{2} Chong^{1}
Hakka
- Romanization: Vun^{2} Zung^{1}
- Pha̍k-fa-sṳ: Vùn Chûng
Yue: Cantonese
- Jyutping: Man^{4} Zung^{1}

Luo Bingzhang (Chinese: 駱秉章; 9 January 1793 - 1 September 1867), born Luo Jun (駱俊), courtesy name Yumen (籲門), art name Ruzhai (儒齋), posthumous name Wenzhong (文忠), was an official, military general, and devout Confucian scholar of the Qing dynasty of China.

Luo raised the Green Standard Army and helped create the Xiang Army to fight effectively against the Taiping Rebellion and restore the stability of the Qing dynasty. He was known for his strategic perception, administrative skill, but also sometimes for his ruthlessness in the execution of his policies, he arrested Shi Dakai.

== Early life ==
Luo was born in Hua County, Guangdong in 1793. In 1832, at age 39, he earned the Jinshi degree, the highest level of the imperial examinations, which led to his appointment to the Hanlin Academy, a body of outstanding Chinese literary scholars who performed literary tasks for the imperial court. Luo served in Beijing for more than 16 years.

== Official Ranks ==
- In 1848 Vice Governor of Hubei
- In 1850–1853 Governor of Hunan
- In 1860–1867 Viceroy of Sichuan

== Noted calligrapher ==
Luo was one of noted calligraphers in Qing Dynasty. Now stored in the Museum of Foshan.
