= Guanwen =

Qing official and general (1798 – 1871)

First Class Count Guowei Guanwen
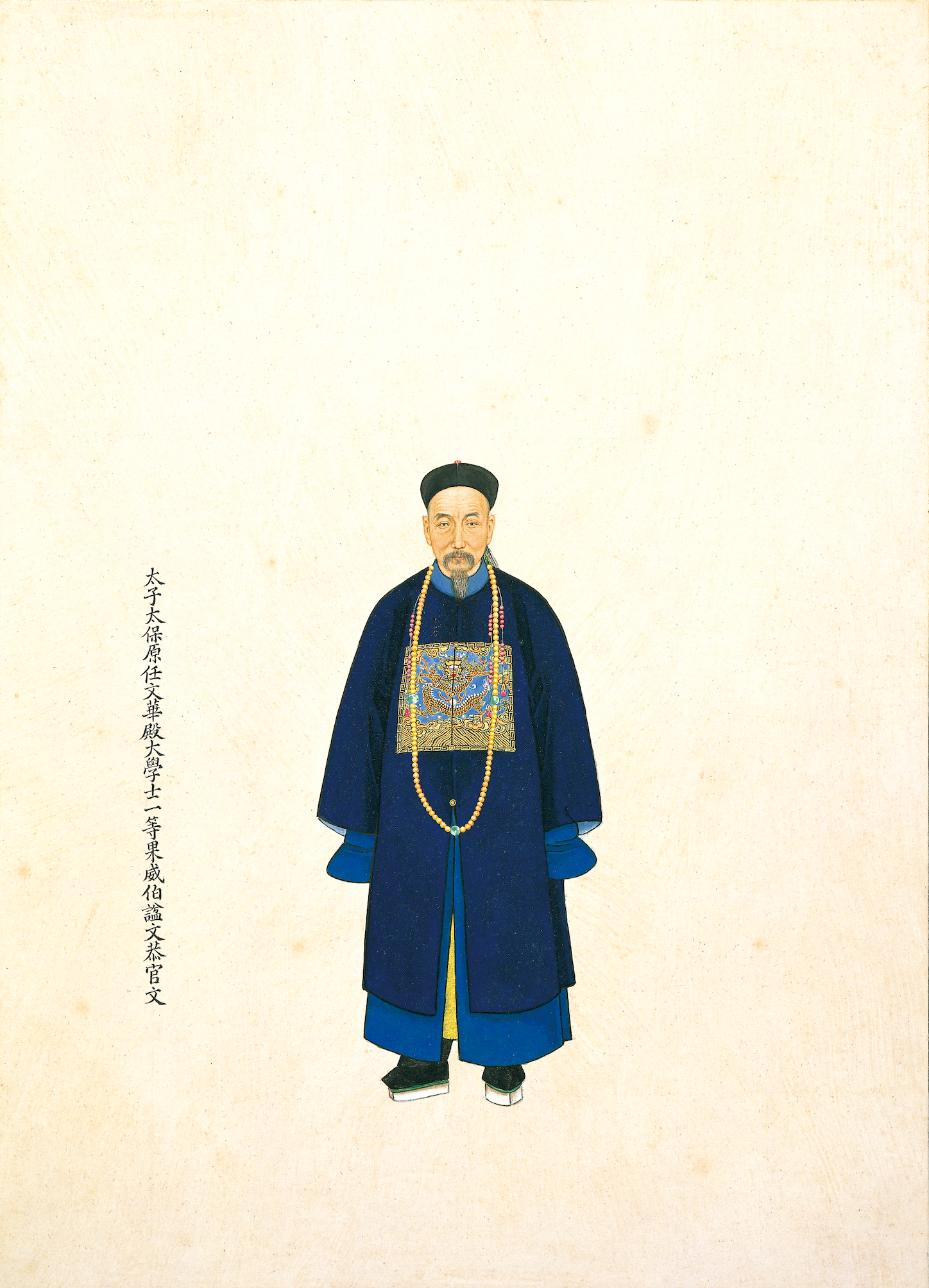

Grand Secretary of the Wenhua Hall
- In office 1862–1871

Grand Secretary of the Wenyuan Library
- In office 1860–1862

Assistant Grand Secretary
- In office 1858–1860

Viceroy of Zhili
- In office 1867–1868
- Preceded by: Liu Changyou
- Succeeded by: Zeng Guofan

Viceroy of Huguang
- In office 1855–1866
- Preceded by: Yang Pei
- Succeeded by: Tang Tingxiang (acting)

Personal details
- Born: 1798
- Died: 1871 (aged 72–73)
- Occupation: politician, general
- Clan name: Wanggiya (王佳)
- Courtesy name: Xiufeng (秀峰)
- Posthumous name: Wengong (文恭)

Military service
- Allegiance: Qing dynasty
- Branch/service: Han Chinese Imperial Household Department Plain White Banner; Manchu Plain White Banner
- Rank: General
- Commands: Green Standard Army
- Battles/wars: Taiping Rebellion

Guanwen (Chinese: 官文, Manchu: ᡤᡠᠸᠠᠨᠸᡝᠨ, romanized: guwanwen, 1798 – 1871), courtesy name Xiufeng (Chinese: 秀峰), was a Manchu official, Grand Secretariat, military general, Viceroy of Zhili, Huguang and commander of the Army Group Central Plain during the late Qing dynasty in China.

Guanwen was born in a Manchu clan Wanggiya. He raised the Green Standard Army to fight effectively against the Taiping Rebellion and restored the stability of the Qing dynasty along with other prominent figures, including Zuo Zongtang and Li Hongzhang, setting the scene for the era later known as the "Tongzhi Restoration" (同治中兴). He was known for his strategic perception and administrative skill.

== Oversight of the Xiang Army ==
Guanwen was appointed Viceroy of Huguang from 1856 when the civil war. This was after two previous holders of the post had been killed in battle and another had committed suicide. Guanwen led the 600,000-strong Green Standard Army in the Central Plain.

Government offices
Preceded by Young Pei (acting)	Viceroy of Huguang; 1855–1867	Succeeded by Li Hongzhang
Preceded by Liu Changyou (acting)	Viceroy of Zhili; 1867–1868	Succeeded by Zeng Guofan
