= Panthay Rebellion =

Muslim revolt against the Qing dynasty

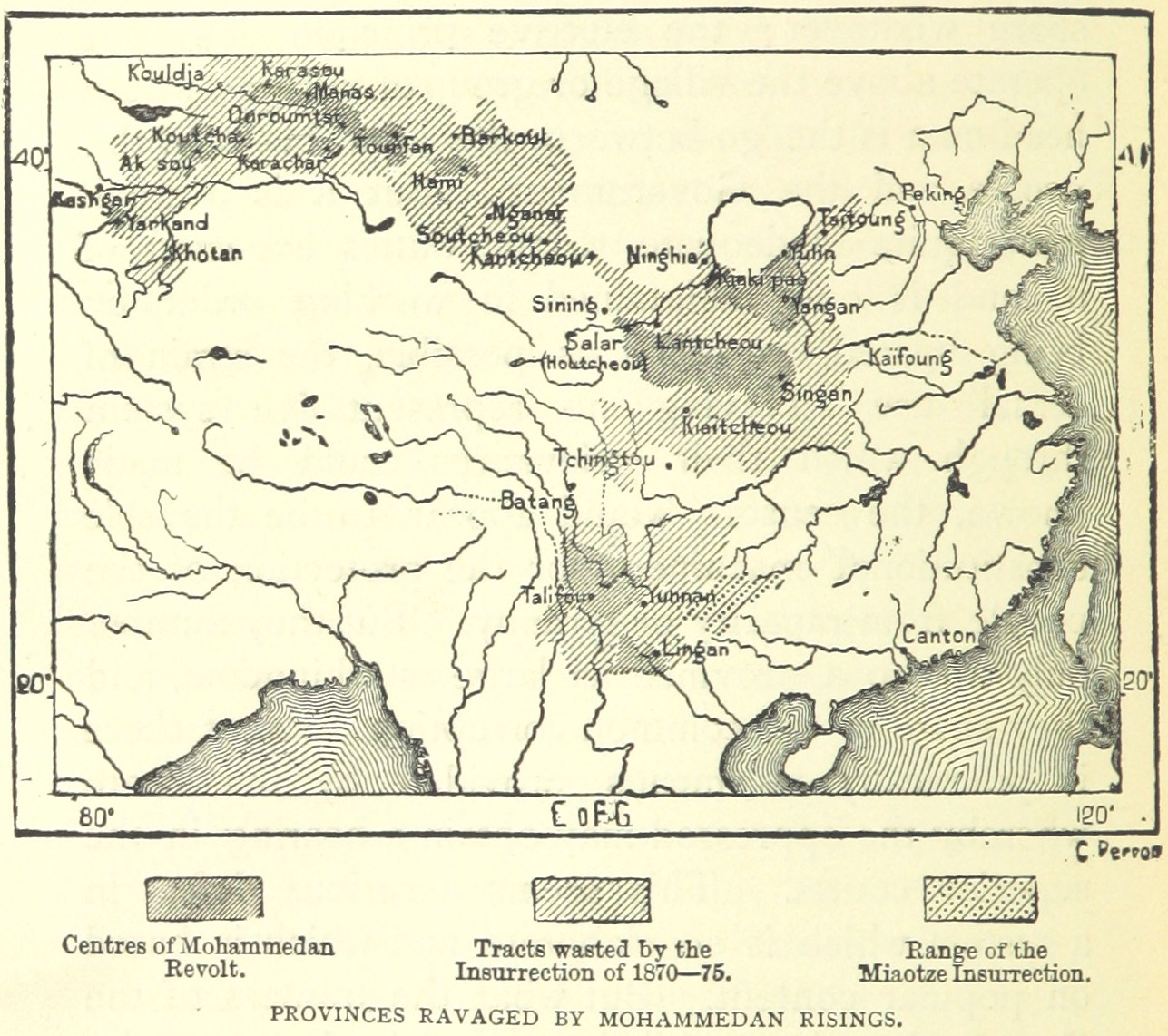
- Map of the Muslim Uprisings against the Qing Empire
Date	1856–1873
Location	Yunnan, Qing Empire
Result	Qing victory: Fall of Pingnan Guo; Weakening of the Qing dynasty

Belligerents
(Qing dynasty) Qing Empire	Pingnan Guo

Commanders and leaders
(Qing dynasty) Cen Yuying (Qing dynasty) Ma Rulong	Du Wenxiu (executed); Ma Shenglin †; Ma Shilin

Strength
Manchu, Han Chinese, and Loyalist Muslim troops	Rebel Muslims, Rebel Han Chinese and Muslim ethnic minorities

Casualties and losses
1,000,000 dead	1,000,000 (including Muslim and non-Muslim civilians and soldiers)

Panthay Rebellion
- Traditional Chinese: 杜文秀起義
- Simplified Chinese: 杜文秀起义
- Literal meaning: Du Wenxiu uprising
Transcriptions
Standard Mandarin
- Hanyu Pinyin: Dù Wénxiù qǐyì
- IPA: [tû wə̌nɕjôʊ tɕʰìî]

Alternative Chinese name
- Traditional Chinese: 雲南回變
- Simplified Chinese: 云南回变
- Literal meaning: Yunnan Hui rebellion
Transcriptions
Standard Mandarin
- Hanyu Pinyin: Yúnnán Huí biàn

The Panthay Rebellion (1856–1873), also known as the Du Wenxiu Rebellion (Tu Wen-hsiu Rebellion), was a rebellion of the Muslim Hui people and other (Muslim as well as non-Muslim) ethnic groups against the Manchu-led Qing dynasty in southwestern Yunnan Province, as part of a wave of Hui-led multi-ethnic unrest.

The name "Panthay" is a Burmese word, which is said to be identical with the Shan word Pang hse. It was the name by which the Burmese called the Chinese Muslims who came with caravans to Burma from the Chinese province of Yunnan. The name was not used or known in Yunnan itself. The rebellion referred to itself as the Pingnan Kingdom, meaning Pacified Southern Kingdom.

== Background ==
In 1856, a massacre of Muslims organized by a Qing Manchu official responsible for suppressing the revolt in the provincial capital of Kunming sparked a province-wide multi-ethnic insurgency. The Manchu official who started the anti-Muslim massacre was Shuxing'a, who developed a deep hatred of Muslims after an incident where he was stripped naked and nearly lynched by a mob of Muslims. He ordered several Muslim rebels to be slowly sliced to death. However, Tariq Ali claimed in his works that the Muslims who had nearly lynched Shuxing'a were not Hui, but belonged to another ethnicity; nevertheless, the Manchu official blamed all Muslims for the incident.

Meanwhile, in Dali City in western Yunnan, an independent kingdom was established by Du Wenxiu (1823–1872), who was born in Yongchang to a Han Chinese family which had converted to Islam. Du Wenxiu was of Han Chinese origin despite being a Muslim and he led both Hui Muslims and Han Chinese in his civil and military bureaucracy. Du Wenxiu was fought against by another Muslim leader, the defector to the Qing Ma Rulong. The Muslim scholar Ma Dexin, who said that Neo-Confucianism was reconcilable with Islam, approved of Ma Rulong defecting to the Qing and also assisted other Muslims in defecting.

Du Wenxiu openly claimed that his aims were to drive out the Manchus, unite with the ethnic Han, and destroy those who supported the Qing. Du Wenxiu did not blame Han for the massacres of Hui, instead, he blamed the Manchu regime for the massacres, saying that the Manchus were foreign to China and that they alienated the Chinese and other minorities. Anti-Manchu rhetoric was frequently used by Du, as he further tried to convince both the Han and the Hui to join forces to overthrow the Manchu Qing after 200 years of their rule. Du invited the fellow Hui Muslim leader Ma Rulong to join him in driving the Manchu Qing out and "recover China". For his war against Manchu "oppression", Du "became a Muslim hero", while Ma Rulong defected to the Qing. On multiple occasions Kunming was attacked and sacked by Du Wenxiu's forces. His capital was Dali. The revolt ended in 1873. Du Wenxiu is regarded as a hero by the present day government of China. Du Wenxiu has recorded issued call for the complete expulsion of the Manchus from all of China in order for China to come under Chinese rule once again. During this insurrection, Dun Wenxiu has released a slogan:

To bring peace to Han, Down with the Qing court. (Chinese: 安漢反清)

Albert Fytche opined this revolt was not religious in nature, since the Muslims were joined by the non-Muslim Shan and Kakhyen and other hill tribes. Fytche reported this testimony from a British officer, and he also stated that the Chinese were tolerant of different religions so they were unlikely to have caused the revolt by interfering in the practice of Islam. In addition, loyalist Muslim forces helped Qing crush the rebel Muslims. Instead, the discrimination by China's imperial administration against the Hui caused their rebellions. James Hastings wrote in Volume 8 of the Encyclopedia of Religion and Ethics that the Panthay Revolt was set off by racial antagonism and class warfare, rather than due to Islam and religion.

However, some sources suggest that the Panthay Rebellion originated solely as a conflict between Han and Hui miners in 1853, despite Han-Hui tension existing for decades prior to the event, including a three-day massacre of Hui by Han and Qing officials in 1845. Hui and Han were regarded and classified by Qing as two different ethnic groups, with Hui not seen as an exclusively religious classification.

== Course of the war ==
Flag used by Du Wenxiu

Seal of Pingnan Guo

The rebellion started as widespread local uprisings in virtually every region of the province. It was the rebels in western Yunnan under the leadership of Du Wenxiu who, by gaining control of Dali in 1856 (which they retained until its fall in 1872), became the major military and political center of opposition to the Qing government. Upon taking power, Du Wenxiu promised that he would ally with the Taiping Rebellion, which also aimed to overthrew the Qing dynasty. The rebels captured the city of Dali, which became the base for their operations, and they declared themselves a separate political entity from China. The rebels identified their nation as Pingnan Guo (Ping-nan Kuo; simplified Chinese: 平南国; traditional Chinese: 平南國; lit. 'Pacified Southern State'). Tribal pagan animism, Confucianism, and Islam were all legalized and "honoured" with a "Chinese-style bureaucracy" in Du Wenxiu's Sultanate. A third of the Sultanate's military posts were filled with Han Chinese, who also filled the majority of civil posts. Du Wenxiu wore Chinese clothing, and he mandated the use of the Arabic language by his regime. Du also banned pork. Ma Rulong also banned pork in areas under his control after he surrendered and joined the Qing forces.

The Imperial government was hindered by a profusion of problems in various parts of the sprawling empire, including the Taiping Rebellion. China was also still suffering from the shocks caused by the first series of unequal treaties, such as the Treaty of Nanking. These circumstances favored the ascendancy of the Muslims in Yunnan. A total war was waged against Manchu rule. Du Wenxiu refused to surrender, unlike the other rebellious Muslim commander, Ma Rulong.

=== Negotiations ===
During the revolt, Hui from provinces which were not in rebellion, like Sichuan and Zhejiang, served as negotiators between rebellious Hui and the Qing government. One of Du Wenxiu's banners read "Deprive the Manchu Qing of their Mandate to Rule" (革命滿清), and he called on Han to assist Hui in their attempt to overthrow the Manchu regime and drive the Manchus out of China.

=== The "Pacified" Southern Kingdom ===
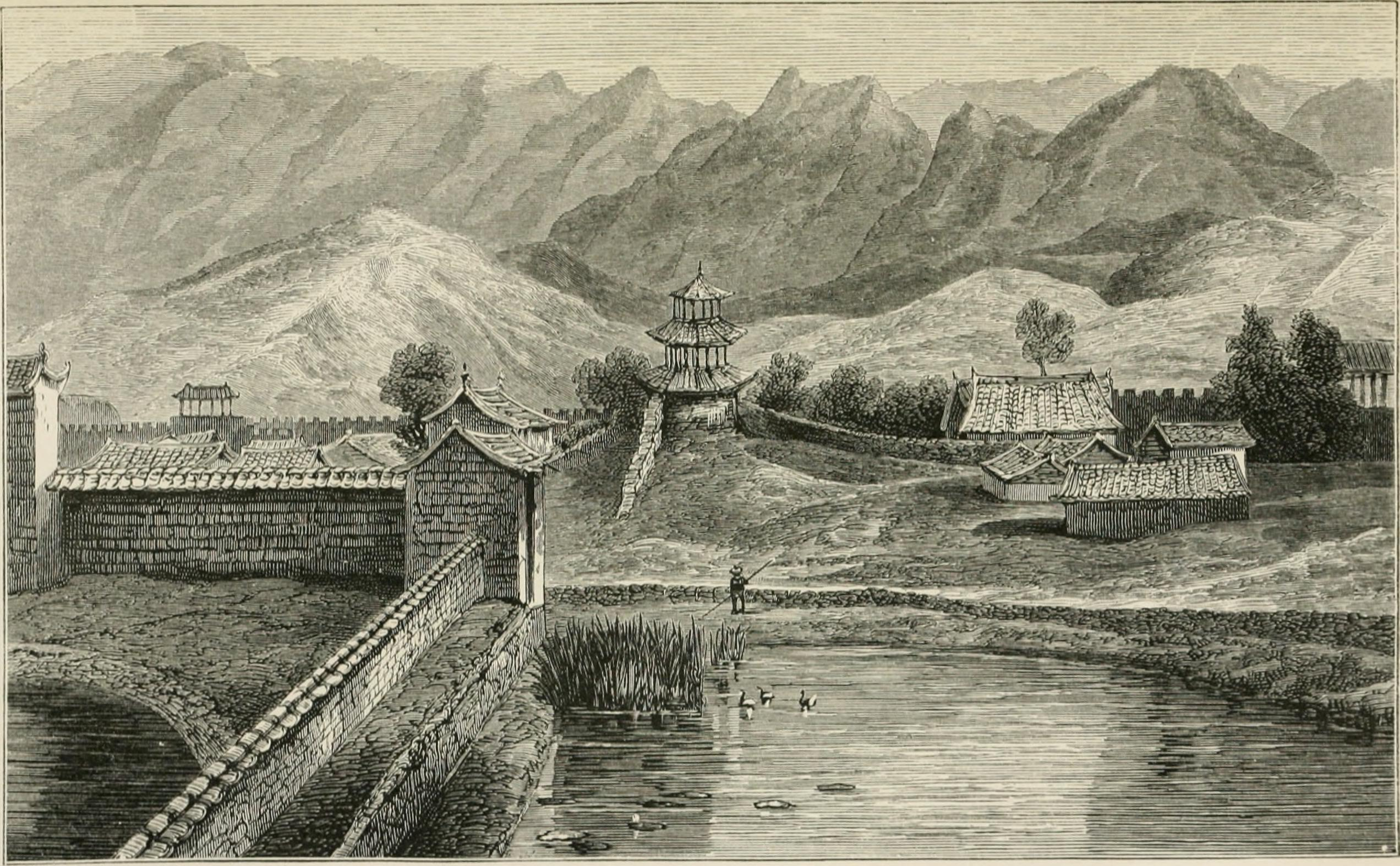
Momien during the Pingnan Kingdom, from Colonel Sladen and Browne

The Manchus had secretly hounded mobs on to the rich Panthays, provoked anti-Hui riots and instigated destruction of their mosques. The rebels were joined by non-Muslim Shan and Kachin people and other hill tribes in the revolt. Du's forces led multiple non-Muslim forces, including Li, Bai, and Hani. loyalist Muslim forces helped Qing in their effort to pacify rebellions. They wrested one important city after another from the hands of the imperial mandarins. The Chinese towns and villages that resisted were pillaged, and the male populations there were massacred. All the places that yielded were spared. The ancient holy city of Dali fell to the Panthays in 1857. With the capture of Dali, Muslim supremacy became an established fact in Yunnan. This may have had something to do with the sects of Islam practiced among the rebels. The Gedimu Hanafi Sunni Muslims under Ma Rulong readily defected to Qing, while the Jahriyya Sufi Muslims did not surrender. Some of the Jahriyya rebels in the Panthay Rebellion like Ma Shenglin were related to the Dungan revolt Jahriyya leader Ma Hualong and maintained contact with them.

The eight years from 1860 to 1868 were the heyday of the Sultanate. The Panthays had either taken or destroyed forty towns and one hundred villages. During this period the Sultan Suleiman, on his way to Mecca as a pilgrim, visited Rangoon, presumably via the Kengtung route, and from there to Calcutta where he had a chance to see the British in India.

Qing Suppression of the Panthay Rebellion

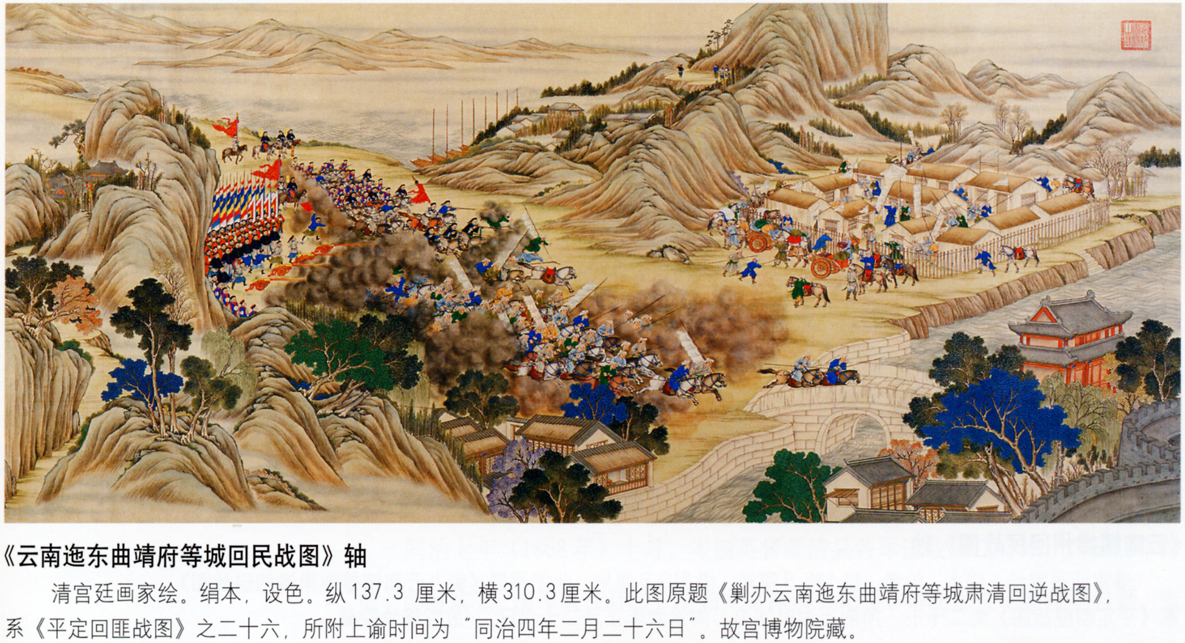
Capture of Qujing.

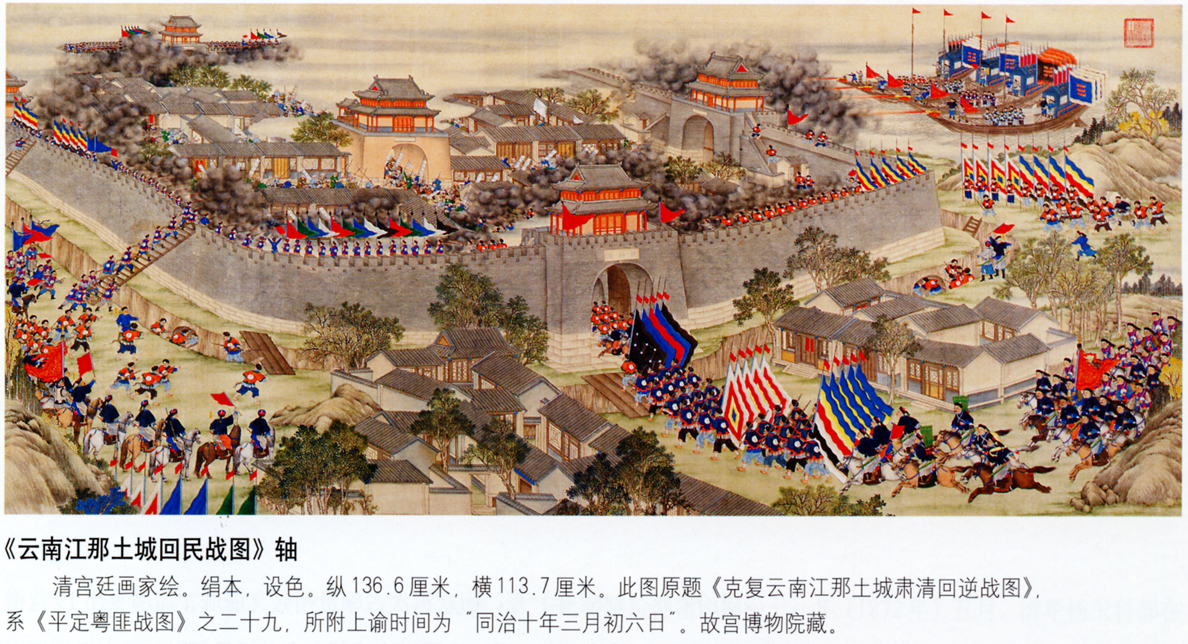
Capture of Jiangna

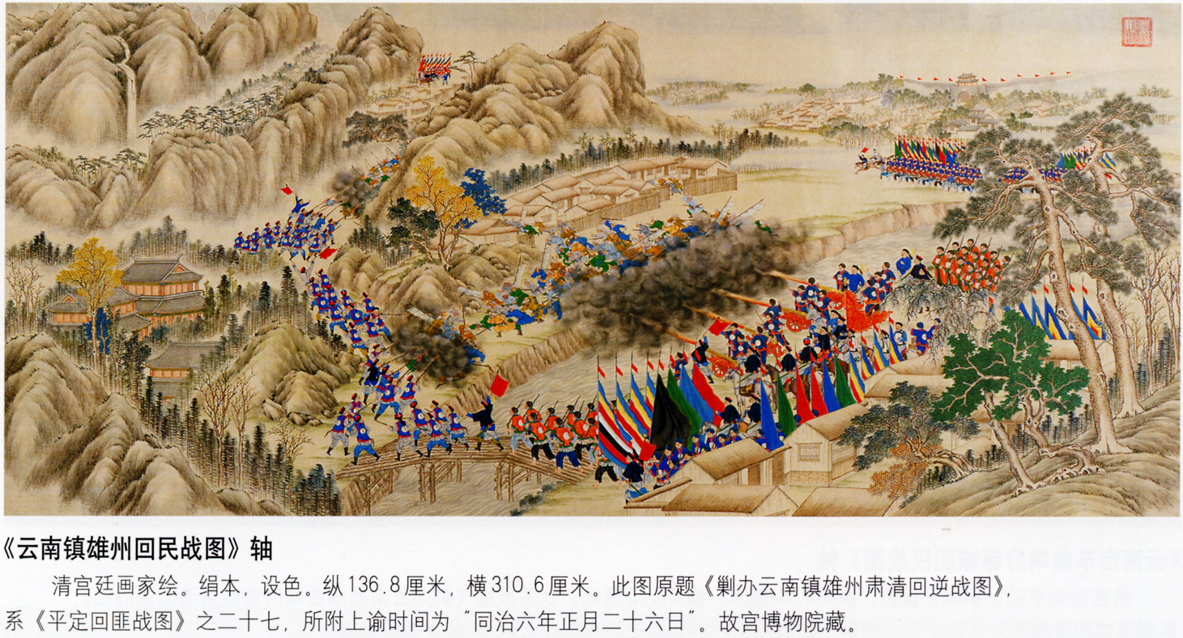
Capture of Zhenxiong.

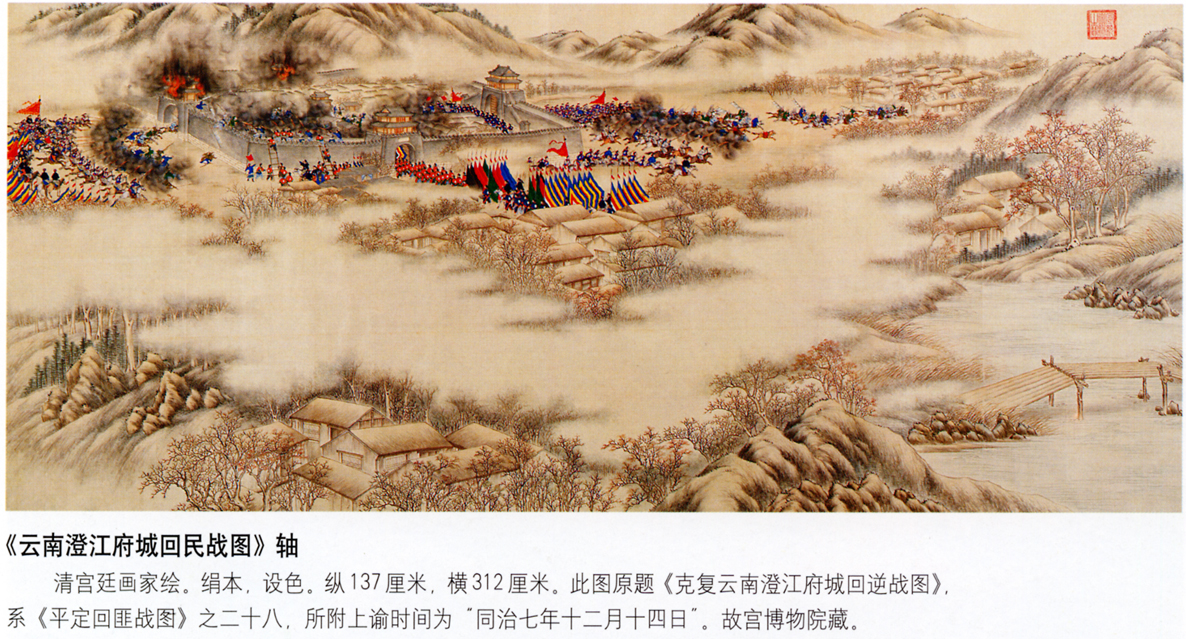
Battle of Chenggjiang

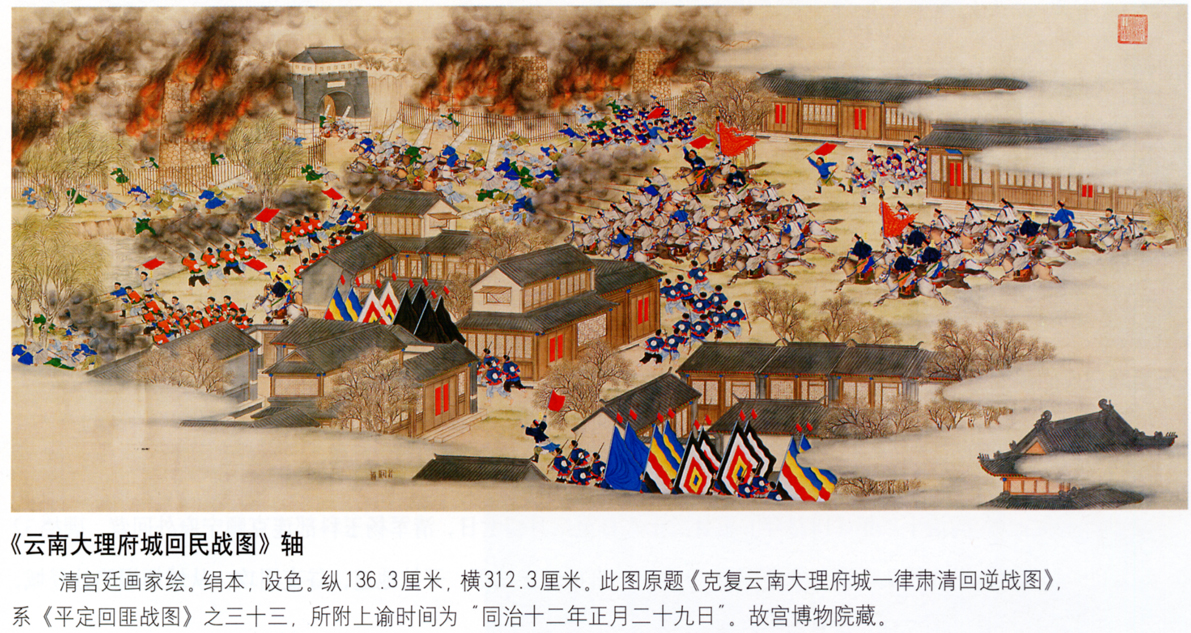
Capture of Dali, the capital of the Pingnan Sultanate

Scroll paintings by artists of the Qing Imperial Court from the collection of the Palace Museum, Forbidden City

=== Decline ===
The Sultanate's power declined after 1868. The Chinese Imperial government had succeeded in reinvigorating itself. By 1871 it was directing a campaign for the annihilation of the obdurate Hui Muslims of Yunnan. By degrees the Imperial government had tightened the cordon around the Sultanate. The Sultanate proved unstable as soon as the Imperial government made a regular and determined attack on it. Town after town fell under well-organized attacks from imperial troops. Dali itself was besieged by imperial forces. Sultan Sulayman (also spelt Suleiman) found himself caged in by the walls of his capital. Desperately looking for outside help, he turned to the British for military assistance. He realized that only British military intervention could have saved his Sultanate.

The Sultan had reasons for turning to the British. British authorities in India and British Burma had sent a mission led by Major Sladen to the town of Tengyue in present-day Yunnan (known as Momien in the Shan language) from May–July 1868. The Sladen mission had stayed seven weeks at Momien meeting with rebel officials. The main purpose of the mission was to revive the Ambassadorial Route between Bhamo and Yunnan and resuscitate border trade, which had almost ceased since 1855, mainly because of the Yunnan Muslims' rebellion.

Taking advantage of the friendly relations resulting from Sladen's visit, Sultan Sulayman, in his fight for the survival of the Pingnan Guo Sultanate, turned to the British Empire for formal recognition and military assistance. In 1872 he sent his adopted son Prince Hassan to England with a personal letter to Queen Victoria, via Burma, in an attempt to obtain official recognition of the Panthay Empire as an independent power. The Hassan Mission was accorded courtesy and hospitality in both British Burma and England. However, the British politely but firmly refused to intervene militarily in Yunnan against Peking. In any case the mission came too late—while Hassan and his party were abroad, Dali was captured by Imperial troops in January 1873.

The Imperial government had waged an all-out war against the Sultanate with the help of French artillery experts. The ill-equipped rebels with no allies were no match for their modern equipment, trained personnel and numerical superiority. Thus, within two decades of its rise, the power of the Panthays in Yunnan fell. Seeing no escape and no mercy from his relentless foe, Sultan Sulayman tried to take his own life before the fall of Dali. However, before the opium he drank took full effect, he was beheaded by his enemies. Manchu troops then began a massacre of the rebels, killing thousands of civilians, sending severed ears along with the heads of their victims. His body is entombed in Xiadui outside of Dali. The Sultan's head was preserved in honey and dispatched to the Imperial Court in Peking as a trophy and a testimony to the decisive nature of the victory of the Imperial Manchu Qing over the Muslims of Yunnan.

One of the Muslim generals, Ma Rulong (Ma Julung), defected to the Qing side. He then helped the Qing forces crush his fellow Muslim rebels. He was called Marshal Ma by Europeans and acquired almost total control of Yunnan province.

In the 1860s, when Ma Rulong in central and west Yunnan, fought to crush the rebel presence to bring the area under Qing control, a great-uncle of Ma Shaowu Ma Shenglin defended Greater Donggou against Ma Rulong's army. Ma Shenglin was the religious head of the Jahriyya menhuan in Yunnan and a military leader. A mortar killed him during the battle in 1871.

Scattered remnants of the Pingnan Guo troops continued their resistance after the fall of Dali, but when Momien was next besieged and stormed by imperial troops in May 1873, their resistance broke completely. Gov. Ta-sa-kon was captured and executed by order of the Imperial government.

== Aftermath ==
=== Atrocities ===
Though largely forgotten, the bloody rebellion caused the deaths of up to a million people in Yunnan. Many adherents to the Yunnanese Muslim cause were persecuted by the imperial Manchus. Wholesale massacres of Yunnanese Muslims followed. Many fled with their families across the Burmese border and took refuge in the Wa State where, about 1875, they set up the exclusively Hui town of Panglong.

For a period of perhaps ten to fifteen years following the collapse of the Panthay Rebellion, the province's Hui minority was widely discriminated against by the victorious Qing, especially in the western frontier districts contiguous with Burma. During these years the refugee Hui settled across the frontier within Burma gradually established themselves in their traditional callings – as merchants, caravaneers, miners, restaurateurs and (for those who chose or were forced to live beyond the law) as smugglers and mercenaries and became known in Burma as the Panthay.

At least 15 years after the collapse of the Panthay Rebellion, the original Panthay settlements in Burma had grown to include numbers of Shan and other hill peoples.

Panglong, a Chinese Muslim town in British Burma, was entirely destroyed by the Japanese invaders in the Japanese invasion of Burma. The Hui Muslim Ma Guanggui became the leader of the Hui Panglong self-defense guard created by Su who was sent by the Kuomintang government of the Republic of China to fight against the Japanese invasion of Panglong in 1942. The Japanese destroyed Panglong, burning it and driving out the over 200 Hui households out as refugees. Yunnan and Kokang received Hui refugees from Panglong driven out by the Japanese. One of Ma Guanggui's nephews was Ma Yeye, a son of Ma Guanghua and he narrated the history of Panglang included the Japanese attack. An account of the Japanese attack on the Hui in Panglong was written and published in 1998 by a Hui from Panglong called "Panglong Booklet". The Japanese attack in Burma caused the Hui Mu family to seek refuge in Panglong but they were driven out again to Yunnan from Panglong when the Japanese attacked Panglong.

=== Impact on Muslims ===
The Qing dynasty did not massacre Muslims who surrendered, in fact, Muslim General Ma Rulong, who surrendered and join the Qing campaign to crush the rebel Muslims, was promoted, and among Yunnan's military officers serving the Qing, he was the strongest.

The Qing armies left alone Muslims who did not revolt like in Yunnan's northeast prefecture of Zhaotong where there was a big Muslim population density after the war.

The use of Muslims in the Qing armies against the revolt was noted by Yang Zengxin.

The third reason is that at the time that Turkic Muslims were waging rebellion in the early years of the Guangxu reign, the 'five elite divisions' that Governor-General Liu Jintang led out of the Pass were all Dungan troops (Chinese: 回队, romanized: Huí duì). Back then, Dungan military commanders such as Cui Wei and Hua Dacai were surrendered troops who had been redeployed. These are undoubtedly cases of pawns who went on to achieve great merit. When Cen Shuying was in charge of military affairs in Yunnan, the Muslim troops and generals that he used included many rebels, and it was because of them that the Muslim rebellion in Yunnan was pacified. These are examples to show that Muslim troops can be used effectively even while Muslim uprisings are still in progress. What is more, since the establishment of the Republic, Dungan have demonstrated not the slightest hint of errant behaviour to suggest that they may prove to be unreliable.

=== Impact on Burma ===
The rebellion had a significant negative impact on the Konbaung dynasty. After ceding lower Burma to the British following the First Anglo-Burmese War, Burma lost access to vast tracts of rice-growing land. Not wishing to upset China, the Burmese kingdom agreed to refuse trade with the Pingnan Guo rebels in accordance with China's demands. Without the ability to import rice from China, Burma was forced to import rice from India. In addition, the Burmese economy had relied heavily on cotton exports to China, and suddenly lost access to the vast Chinese market. Many surviving Hui refugees escaped over the border to neighboring countries, Burma, Thailand and Laos, forming the basis of a minority Chinese Hui population in those nations.

== See also ==
- Third plague pandemic
- Panthay
- Islam in China
- Islam during the Qing dynasty
- Islamophobia in China
- Yusuf Ma Dexin, a prominent Muslim scholar in Yunnan at the time of the rebellions
- Taiping Rebellion
- Nian Rebellion
- Miao Rebellion (1854–1873)
- Nepalese-Tibetan War
- Dungan revolt (1862–1877)
- Punti–Hakka Clan Wars

== Bibliography ==
- Atwill, David G. (2005), The Chinese Sultanate: Islam, Ethnicity and the Panthay Rebellion in Southwest China, 1856-1873, Stanford University Press, ISBN 0-8047-5159-5
- Chang, Wen-Chin (16 January 2015). Beyond Borders: Stories of Yunnanese Chinese Migrants of Burma. Cornell University Press. ISBN 978-0-8014-5450-9.
- Chesneaux, Jean; Bastid, Marianne; Bergère, Marie-Claire (1976). China from the opium wars to the 1911 revolution. Pantheon Books. ISBN 0-394-49213-7.
- Davenport Northrop, Henry (1894), "The flowery kingdom and the land of the Mikado, or, China, Japan and Corea", Making of America Project, London, CA-ON: J.H.Moore Co. Inc.
- Dillon, Michael (26 July 1999), China's Muslim Hui Community: Migration, Settlement and Sects, Richmond, UK: Routledge / Curzon Press, ISBN 0-7007-1026-4
- Fairbank, John King (1980). The Cambridge History of China: Late Chʻing, 1800-1911, pt. 2. Cambridge University Press. ISBN 978-0-521-22029-3.
- Fitzgerald, Charles Patrick (1996), Southern Expansion of the Chinese People: Southern Fields and Southern Ocean, Thailand: White Lotus Co., ISBN 974-8495-81-7
- Forbes, Andrew; Henley, David (2011). Traders of the Golden Triangle. Chiang Mai: Cognoscenti Books. ASIN: B006GMID5K
- Fytche, Albert (1878), Burma past and present, LONDON: C. K. Paul & co.9=(Original from Harvard University)
- de Kavanagh Boulger, Demetrius Charles (1893), A Short History of China: Being an Account for the General Reader of an Ancient Empire and People, W. H. Allen & co.
- de Kavanagh Boulger, Demetrius Charles (1898), The History of China, vol. 2, W. Thacker & co.
- Myint-U, Thant (2007). The River of Lost Footsteps: Histories of Burma. Macmillan. ISBN 978-0374707903.
- Scott, J. George (1900), "i", GUBSS 1, Rangoon Government Printing
- Thant, Myint-U (2001), The Making of Modern Burma, Cambridge University Press, ISBN 978-0-521-78021-6
- Thaung, Dr (1961), "Panthay Interlude in Yunnan: A Study in Vicissitudes Through the Burmese Kaleidoscope", JBRS Fifth Anniversary Publications No. 1, Rangoon Sarpy Beikman
- Yule, Col. Henry; Burnell, A.C. (1968) [1886 (1st ed. Murray, London)], Hobson-Jobson: A Glossary of Colloquial Anglo-Indian Words and Phrases, and of Kindred Terms, Etymological, Historical, Geographical And Discursive, Munshiran Manoharlal (reprint)

Essays, studies

- Garnaut, Anthony (2008), From Yunnan to Xinjiang:Governor Yang Zengxin and his Dungan Generals (PDF), Etudes orientales N°25, archived from the original (PDF) on 9 March 2012

Articles (in journals, magazines etc.)

- "Contemporary Review", Religious toleration in China, vol. 86, July 1904
- Holmes Agnew, John; Hilliard Bidwell, Walter (1900), Eclectic Magazine, Leavitt, Throw and Co.
- Littell, Eliakim; Littell, Robert S. (22 September 1900), "The Living Age", Making of America Project, vol. 225, no. 2933, The Living Age Co. Inc., archived from the original on 23 December 2015
- 王钟翰 (2010), 中国民族史 [Han Chinese National History], GWculture.net, archived from the original on 26 May 2011 (in Chinese) -->
