= 2009 in China =

- Decades: 1980s; 1990s; 2000s; 2010s; 2020s
- See also: Other events of 2009; History of China • Timeline • Years

Events in the year 2009 in China.

== Incumbents ==
- General Secretary of the Chinese Communist Party - Hu Jintao
- President – Hu Jintao
- Premier – Wen Jiabao
- Vice President - Xi Jinping
- Vice Premier - Li Keqiang
- Congress Chairman - Wu Bangguo
- Conference Chairman - Jia Qinglin

=== Governors ===
- Governor of Anhui Province – Wang Sanyun
- Governor of Fujian Province – Huang Xiaojing
- Governor of Gansu Province – Xu Shousheng (until July), Xu Shousheng (starting July)
- Governor of Guangdong Province – Huang Huahua
- Governor of Guizhou Province – Lin Shusen (until August), Zhao Kezhi (starting August)
- Governor of Hainan Province – Luo Baoming
- Governor of Hebei Province – Hu Chunhua (until November), Chen Quanguo (starting November)
- Governor of Heilongjiang Province – Li Zhanshu
- Governor of Henan Province – Guo Gengmao
- Governor of Hubei Province – Luo Qingquan
- Governor of Hunan Province – Zhou Qiang
- Governor of Jiangsu Province – Luo Zhijun
- Governor of Jiangxi Province – Wu Xinxiong
- Governor of Jilin Province – Wang Rulin
- Governor of Liaoning Province – Chen Zhenggao
- Governor of Qinghai Province – Song Xiuyan
- Governor of Shaanxi Province – Yuan Chunqing
- Governor of Shandong Province – Jiang Daming
- Governor of Shanxi Province – Wang Jun
- Governor of Sichuan Province – Jiang Jufeng
- Governor of Yunnan Province – Qin Guangrong
- Governor of Zhejiang Province – Lü Zushan

== Events ==
=== January ===
- January 1 – Tongyong pinyin will no longer be official in the Republic of China, due to the ROC's Ministry of Education's approval of Hanyu pinyin in 2008.
- January 2 – The border demarcation with markers was officially completed between China and Vietnam, signed by Deputy Foreign Minister Vu Dung on the Vietnamese side and his Chinese counterpart, Wu Dawei, on the Chinese side.
- January 5 – Strict enforcements of internet keyword filters in China introduced, leading to mass protests online against internet censorship by Chinese netizens.
- January 7 – Ministry of IT China issues the first 3G network TD-SCDMA for China Mobile.
- January 9 – Nationwide alert throughout China regarding a large number of mass-produced, counterfeit renminbi 100 yuan notes;
- January 13 – People's Liberation Army Navy escorted a Taiwanese merchant ship and three other vessels in the Gulf of Aden near Somalia.
- January 15 –
  - China surpasses Germany to become the third largest economy, based on revised 2007 GDP figures. Chinese officials published the revised figures for 2007 financial year in which growth happened at 13 percent instead of 11.9 percent (provisional figures). China's gross domestic product stood at US$3.4 trillion while Germany's GDP was US$3.3 trillion for 2007. Based on these figures, in 2007 China recorded its fastest growth since 1994 when the GDP grew by 13.1 percent.
  - A Taiwanese government official and a legislator's aide have been arrested in Taipei for allegedly leaking state secrets to Mainland China. The information allegedly leaked included details on the process taken during the transition of power between Chen Shui-bian and Ma Ying-Jeou.
- January 25 – 2009 Xinjiang earthquake

=== February ===
- February 2 – Wen Jiabao shoe-throwing incident
- February 8 – Yunnan hide-and-seek incident
- February 9 – The Television Cultural Center in Beijing, China, adjacent to the CCTV Headquarters, burned in a spectacular fire started by fireworks on Lantern Festival day.
- February 10–17 – Chinese President Hu Jintao visits a series of African and Asian countries, including Saudi Arabia, Mali, Senegal, Tanzania, and Mauritius.
- February 15 – New Star ship incident
- February 17 – The personal details of a large number of Chinese celebrities, which included ID card photos, personal identification numbers and phone numbers, were leaked onto the Internet. This is not the first time such an incident has occurred, with prior minor events occurring throughout 2003 to 2008.
- February 18 – 2009 Winter Universiade
- February 20–22 – United States Secretary of State Hillary Clinton visits Beijing, China.
- February 21 – 2009 Shanxi mine blast
- February 23 – Haiyantang rat and rabbit piece up for sale (see 2009 Auction of Old Summer Palace bronze heads)
- February 25 – Three people attempt self-immolation at Tiananmen Square
- February 28 – PRC naming laws
- Early February - Chinese netizens create what is now known as the Baidu 10 Mythical Creatures over a period throughout the first weeks of February, as a sign of protest against increased censorship on Chinese websites.

=== March ===
- March 1 – Chang'e 1 retires, following its planned crash landing on the Moon.
- March 5 – 2009 National People's Congress
- March 8 – US Impeccable south china sea incident
- March 11 – Minor incident near the Diaoyu Islands as a JSDF patrol boat moved close to the islands. Some sources indicate that both sides scrambled aircraft, involving PLAAF Su-30MKK and Japanese F-15 aircraft, however the situation did not escalate.
- March 17 – China's largest fishery patrol China Yuzheng 311 (中国渔政311船) arrives in Yongxing Island, Xisha Islands, asserting control over the disputed islands in the South China Sea. The territory is disputed with Vietnam.
- March 19 – Japan 2012 visa permit consider listing Taiwanese people living in Japan as coming from Taiwan (independent state), not China.
- March 20 – Chongqing soldier shot.
- March 28 – Serf liberation day
- March 29 – Researchers from the University of Toronto discover GhostNet, a China-based electronic spying operation which has infiltrated at least 1,295 computers in 103 countries.

=== April ===
- April 8 – 2009 Xishui sex trial: The close-door trial started at the People's Court of Xishui County.
- April 9 – Launch of Beidou-2B satellite on a Long March 3A rocket from Xichang Satellite Launch Center.
- April 13 – National Human Rights Action Plan 2009-2010
- April 16 – The government of the People's Republic of China releases economic data for Q1 2009, showing a rise in GDP by 6.1%, fall in CPI by 1.2% during March, PPI down 4.6%, industrial output by 5.1%, retail sales up 15%, and fixed asset investment up 28.8%.
- April 22 –
  - Chinese researchers conclude that the Great Wall of China is 2,851.8 km longer than previously estimated, after analysing data obtained from satellite imagery.
  - Chinese hackers accused of stealing data from the United States Department of Defense regarding the F-35 Lightning II Joint Strike Fighter.
- April 23 – 60th Anniversary of Navy, international fleet review off Qingdao.
- April 24 – CBHD goes on sale
- April 27 – ForeUI software is released by EaSynth Solutions.

=== May ===
- May 1 – The Republic of China allows financial investment from the People's Republic of China for the first time since 1949.
- May 6 – Straits Exchange Foundation chairman Chiang Pin-kung declared his retirement, then withdrew from retirement.
- May 10 – Deng Yujiao incident
- May 12 – China commemorates the first anniversary of the 2008 Sichuan earthquake.
- May 16 – A large ship transporting sand capsizes off the Liaoning coast.
- May 17 – 517 Protest
- May 18 – Head of Guangdong, Man Hing-leong (萬慶良), meets Jasper Tsang and 25 HK Legco member.
- May 19 – Taiwan permitted to send representatives to a World Health Organization conference in Geneva under observer status for the first time under the name Chinese Taipei, with authorization from the People's Republic of China.
- Launch of the Huan Jing 1C satellite on a Long March 2C rocket from Taiyuan Satellite Launch Center.
- May 30 – 2009 Chongqing mine blast
- May 31 – 2009 Shaanxi dog-free zone

=== June ===
- June 2 – As a part of the General Motors bankruptcy crisis, General Motors announces the sale of the Hummer brand of off-road vehicles to Sichuan Tengzhong Heavy Industrial Machinery Company, a machinery company in western China, in which the transaction is expected to close in the third quarter of 2009.
- June 5 – Australian mining company Rio Tinto breaks a deal for Chinese state-owned Chinalco to purchase a larger stake the company, with support by rival Australian mining company BHP Billiton. Rio Tinto is expected to pay a US$195 million breaking fee according to the contract signed earlier by the two parties. Rio Tinto controls large Iron ore reserves in Australia. Since early 2008, Chinalco holds 9% of ownership of Rio Tinto.
- June 5 – Fang Jing spy accusation incident
- June 5 – 2009 Chengdu bus fire
- June 7–13 – Shanghai Pride, the first gay pride festival ever held in the People's Republic of China, takes place in Shanghai.
- June 18 – US, Japan, South Korea assist Asian Development Bank funding to Arunachal Pradesh, old India and China territorial dispute
- June 19 –
  - 2009 Shishou riot
  - 2009 Music king award (勁歌王頒獎禮) with large C-pop star gathering at Chengdu
- June 23 – Liu Xiaobo arrested for Charter 08 democratic reform
- June 25 –
  - Republic of China President Ma Ying-jeou expresses his bid for Kuomintang leadership, as he registered as the sole candidate for the election of the KMT chairmanship. The election is scheduled for July 26, where the new chairman would take office on September 12. If his bid succeeds, he would become the leader of the KMT, as well as the head-of-state of the Republic of China; in effect, this would officially allow Ma to be able to meet with People's Republic of China President Hu Jintao (who is also the General Secretary of the Chinese Communist Party) and other PRC delegates, as he would be able to represent the KMT as leader of a Chinese political party, rather than as head-of-state of a political entity unrecognized by the PRC.
  - Shaoguan incident
- June 27 - Collapse of Lotus Riverside Block 7, at the Lotus Riverside Complex, Shanghai
- June 29 – Hunan train collision

=== July ===
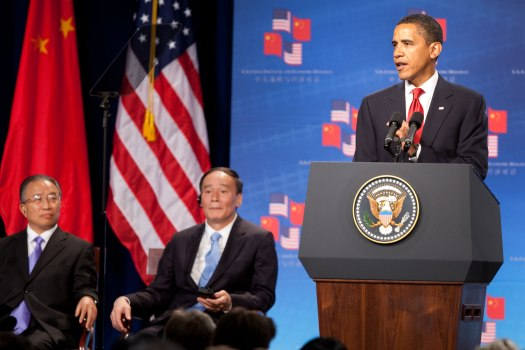
President Barack Obama addresses the opening session of the first U.S.–China Strategic and Economic Dialogue at the Ronald Reagan Building and International Trade Center in Washington, Monday, July 27, 2009. Listening at left are Chinese Vice Premier Wang Qishan, center, and Chinese State Councilor Dai Bingguo, left.

- July 5 –
  - 2009 Ürümqi riots
  - South China flood
- July 9 – 2009 Yunnan earthquake
- July 10 – Four Rio Tinto employees, including one Australian citizen, arrested in Shanghai for corruption and espionage. One of the arrested, Australian citizen Stern Hu is suspected of stealing Chinese state secrets.
- July 12 – Ürümqi oil tank explosion
- July 16 – Sun Danyong, a Chinese factory worker employed by Apple's manufacturing partner Foxconn, committed suicide after reporting to have lost a prototype model for a fourth generation iPhone.
- July 21 – 2009 Nuctech corruption case, company formerly run by Hu Jintao's son Hu Haifeng
- July 23 – The birth of the world's first giant panda conceived using frozen sperm is announced in Sichuan.
- July 24 –
  - First publication of a breakthrough in stem cell research, where Chinese researchers from the Shanghai Stem Cell Institute successfully reprogrammed adult stem cells to be able to differentiate into any body cell.
  - Tonghua Iron and Steel Group riot
- July 26 – Republic of China President Ma Ying-jeou won 93.87% of the vote for KMT leadership, becoming the new chairman of the Kuomintang.
- July 27 – 28: China and the United States hold the first U.S.-China Strategic and Economic Dialogue.
- July 28 – Chinese border police seize 70 kilograms of Vanadium metal bound for North Korea, a material used to manufacture missile components. 200,000RMB of the metal was seized at the Dandong border between China and North Korea.

=== August ===
- August 1 – People's Liberation Army Army Day military parades and presentations
- August 2 – 11 — Typhoon Morakot strikes the island of Taiwan and southern China.
- August 4 – Shijiazhuang lightning incident
- August 8 – 12 — 10,000 refugees from Burma's Kokang Special Region flee to Yunnan following the Kokang incident.
- August 11 – Launch of the Chinese communications satellite Asiasat 5 into orbit.
- August 12 – Tan Zuoren court case
- August 14 – A social network brand, Sina Weibo was launched.
- August 15 – Planned swimming event to take place from Xiamen, People's Republic of China to Kinmen, Republic of China.
- August 19 – Chinese petroleum company PetroChina signs an A$50 billion deal with ExxonMobil to purchase liquefied natural gas from the Gorgon field in Western Australia, considered the largest contract ever signed between China and Australia, which ensures China a steady supply of LPG fuel for 20 years, and also forms as China's largest supply of relatively "clean energy". This deal has been formally secured, despite relations between Australia and China being at their lowest point in years, following the Rio Tinto espionage case and the granting of visas to Rebiya Kadeer to visit Australia.
- August 30 – The 14th Dalai Lama accepts invitation from Pan-Green Kaohsiung mayor Chen Chu to visit Taiwan.

=== September ===
- September 2 – September 2009 Xinjiang unrest
- September 8 – 2009 Henan mine disaster
- September 11 – Former President of the Republic of China Chen Shui-bian is sentenced to life imprisonment for corruption.
- September 17 – 2009 Luoding flood
- September 18 – China wins a “disclosure agreement" vote, which prevents the Asian Development Bank from formally acknowledging Arunachal Pradesh as part of India. All ADB activities in Arunachal Pradesh have effectively ceased.
- September 25 – Xinjiang Kashgar Delicacy City restaurant exploded in Beijing.

=== October ===
- October 1 – 60th Anniversary of the People's Republic of China
- October 2 – Chen Shui-bian's cousin Chen Tian-fu (陳天福) starts Taiwan Communist Party (台灣民主共產黨)
- October 9 –
  - Chinese special forces detect sarin poison gas in the air at North Korea PRC border
  - Lengshuijiang mine accident
- October 10 – Ma Ying-jeou said Republic of China have spent more time on Taiwan soil than Mainland soil.
- October 11 – 11th National Games of China held in Shandong
- October 12 – Hong Kong Press conference held concerning the rendition of Zhou Yongjun
- October 16 – Champion cyclist Wong Kam-po assaulted at National Games
- October 21 – 2009 Luquan protest
- October 30 - SM Lifestyle Center, the fourth SM Mall in mainland China and the second SM Mall in Xiamen, opened.

=== November ===
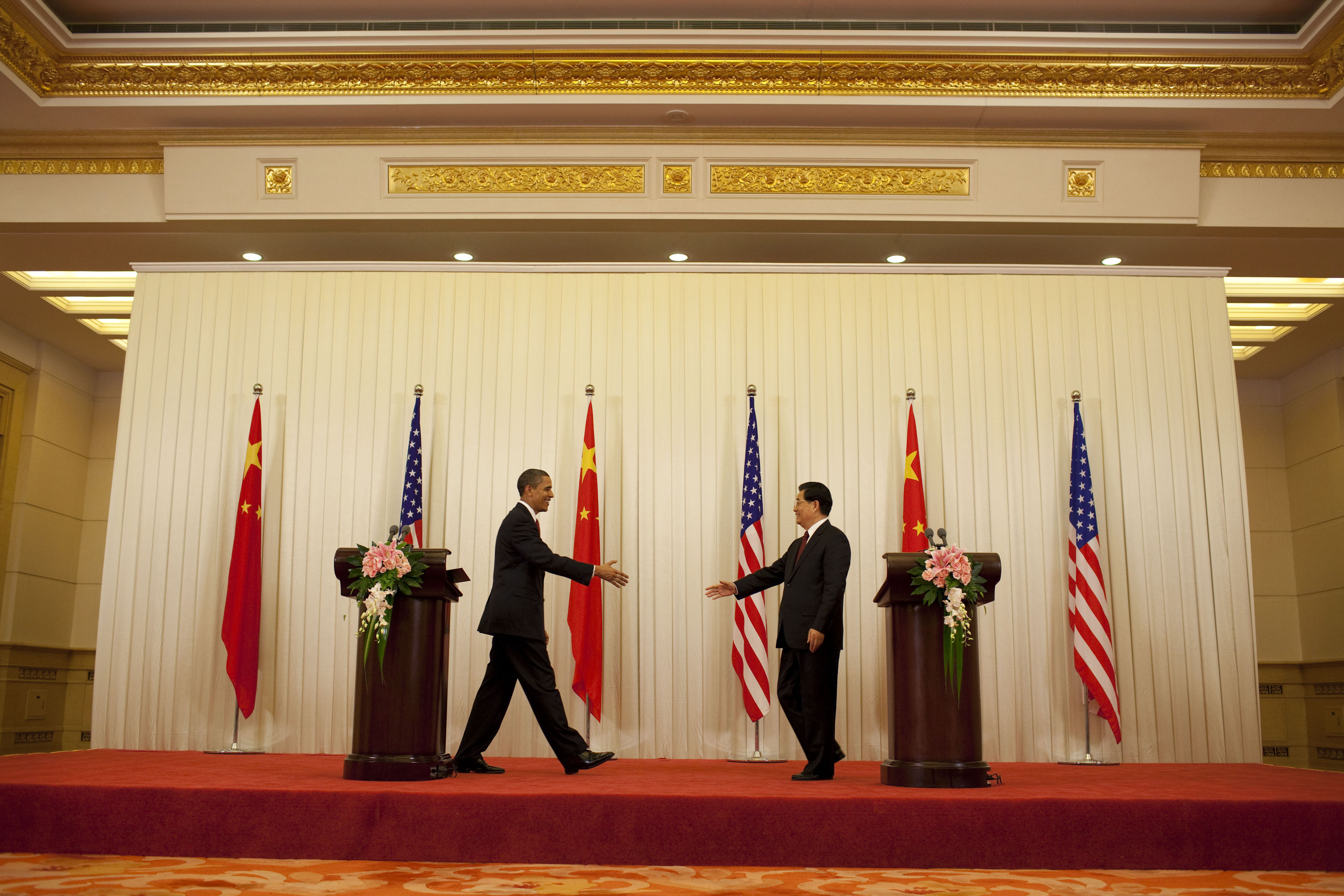
Presidents Obama and Hu meeting on November 17.

- November 4 – Development approved for the creation of a Disneyland in Shanghai.
- November 6 – Chongqing gang trials
- November 8 –
  - 14th Dalai Lama visits Tawang Town Arunachal Pradesh.
  - Forum on China-Africa Cooperation
  - Launch of Yinghuo-1, China's first Mars probe.
- November 13 – Tang Fu-zhen self-immolation incident
- November 15 – 2009 Obama visit to China
- November 18 – Consultation Document on the Methods for Selecting the Chief Executive and for Forming the LegCo in 2012 launched in Hong Kong
- November 21 – 2009 Heilongjiang mine explosion
- November 28 – Miss International 2009 held in Chengdu

=== December ===
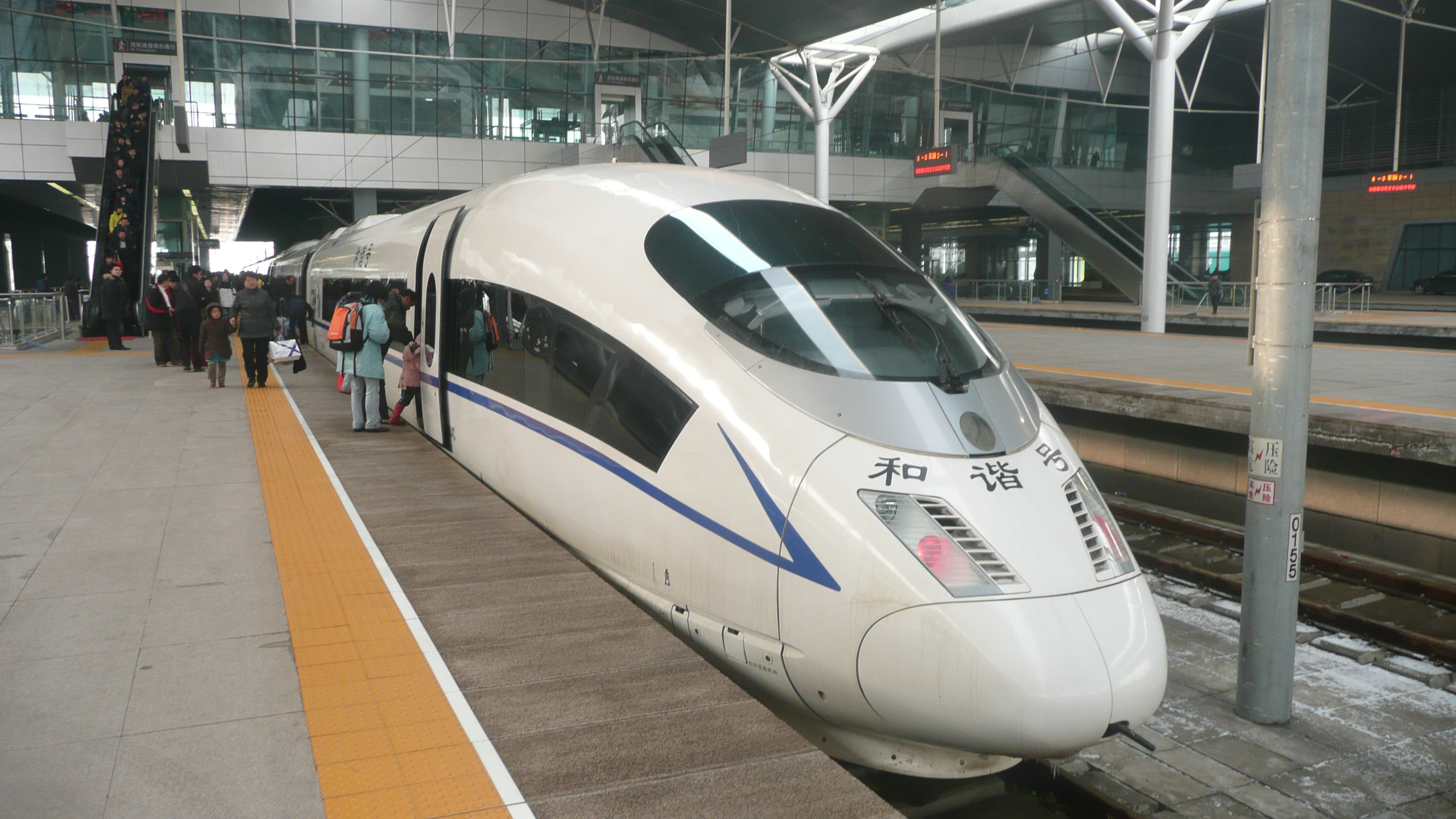
December 26: The world's fastest commercial train service, the Wuhan–Guangzhou High-Speed Railway, is opened

- December 14 –
  - Central Asia – China gas pipeline inauguration
  - Xi Xinzhu self-immolation incident
- December 21 – Fourth Chen-Chiang summit
- December 26 – The Wuhan–Guangzhou High-Speed Railway, the world's fastest commercial train service, is opened.
- December 27 – A tomb, believed to be that of Cao Cao, one of the Chinese leaders during the Three Kingdoms period, is discovered in Henan.
- December 28 – Xinhua News Agency reports that the People's Liberation Army Navy has rescued 25 sailors and the De Xin Hai, a hijacked Chinese cargo ship, two months after they were seized off Somalia.
- December 29 –
  - China displaces the U.S. as the largest overall buyer of Japanese goods in 2009.
  - Despite requests from the British government for clemency, Akmal Shaikh, a British national, is executed in the People's Republic of China for trafficking heroin.

== Sports ==
- January 1 and 4: 31st Guangdong-Hong Kong Cup
- May 10 – 17: 2009 Sudirman Cup held in the Tianhe Sports Center of Guangzhou, China.
- November 28 - December 13: 2009 World Women's Handball Championship
- December 5 – 13: 2009 East Asian Games held in Hong Kong

== Births ==
- May 27 – Lin Bing, female giant panda
- August 5 – Yun Zi, male giant panda

== Deaths ==
- January 3 – Li Zuopeng, 94, Chinese general and politician.
- January 22 – Liang Yusheng, 85, Chinese novelist, natural causes.
- February 3 – Sheng-yen, 79, Chinese-born Taiwanese Buddhist Zen master, kidney disease.
- February 5 – Xiangzhong Yang, 49, Chinese-born American stem cell scientist, cancer.
- March 5 – Hung-Chang Lin, 89, Chinese-born American inventor, lung cancer.
- June 2 – Kai Lai Chung, 92, Chinese-born American mathematician.
- June 5 – Luo Jing, 48, Chinese news presenter, lymphoma.
- June 30 – Shi Pei Pu, 70, Chinese opera singer, gender-bending spy who was basis for M. Butterfly.
- July 11 – Ji Xianlin, 97, Chinese linguist, paleographer, historian and writer, heart attack.
- July 16 – Thomas Dao, 88, Chinese-born American physician, expert in breast cancer treatment, Pick's Disease.
- July 27 – Domingos Lam, 81, Chinese Roman Catholic bishop of Macau.
- July 29 – Zhuo Lin, 93, Chinese consultant, widow of Deng Xiaoping.
- September 14 – Jing Shuping, 91, Chinese businessman, founder of Minsheng Bank.
- October 4 – James Lin Xili, 91, Chinese underground first Bishop of Wenzhou (since 1992), Alzheimer's disease.
- October 13 – Lü Zhengcao, 104, Chinese general, last survivor of the original Shang Jiang.
- October 29 – Bei Shizhang, 106, Chinese biologist and educator.
- October 31 – Qian Xuesen, 97, Chinese scientist and co-founder of the JPL.
- October 31 – Chen Lin, 39, Chinese pop singer, suicide by jumping.
- November 2 – Nien Cheng, 94, Chinese author and political prisoner.
- November 5 – Peter Chen Bolu, 96, Chinese Roman Catholic Bishop of Daming.
- November 23 – Yang Xianyi, 94, Chinese translator.
- December 4 – Matthew Luo Duxi, 90, Chinese Roman Catholic Bishop of Jiading.
- December 23 – Ngapoi Ngawang Jigme, 99, Chinese politician, Chairman of the Tibet Autonomous Region (1964–1968; 1981–1983).
- December 30 – Leon Yao Liang, 86, Chinese bishop.
- December 31 – Qian Xinzhong, 98, Chinese politician, Minister of Health (1965–1973, 1979–1983).

== See also ==
- List of Chinese films of 2009
- 2009 in Chinese football
- Chinese Football Association Yi League 2009
- Chinese Football Association Jia League 2009
- Chinese Super League 2009
