= Taiwanese people =

- Flag of the Republic of China

Total population
- 26,193,616 Map of the Taiwanese Diaspora

Regions with significant populations
- Taiwan: 23,400,220
- United States: 373,943–964,000
- China: 404,000
- Indonesia: 210,000
- Canada: 69,550–173,000
- Thailand: 145,000
- Japan: 52,768
- Brazil: 38,000
- Vietnam: 72,000
- Malaysia: 44,000
- Brunei: 38,000
- Australia: 34,000
- South Korea: 30,985
- Singapore: 30,000
- France: 12,000
- Argentina: 11,000

Languages
- Taiwanese Mandarin; Taiwanese Hokkien; Hakka; Indigenous Taiwanese languages

Religion
- Chinese folk religions; Mahayana Buddhism; Confucianism; Taoism; Minority Christianity; Shintoism; Other religions

Related ethnic groups
- Han Taiwanese people; Austronesian peoples; Taiwanese indigenous peoples; Taiwanese Americans

Taiwanese people
- Traditional Chinese: 臺灣人
- Simplified Chinese: 台湾人
Transcriptions
Standard Mandarin
- Hanyu Pinyin: Táiwān rén
- Bopomofo: ㄊㄞˊ ㄨㄢ ㄖㄣˊ
- Gwoyeu Romatzyh: Tair'uan ren
- Wade–Giles: T'ai^{2}-wan^{1} jen^{2}
- Tongyong Pinyin: Táiwan rén
- MPS2: Táiwān rén
- IPA: [tʰǎɪ.wán ɻə̌n]
Hakka
- Romanization: Thòi-vàn ngìn
Yue: Cantonese
- Yale Romanization: Tòih Wāan yàhn4
- Jyutping: Toi4 Waan1 jan4
- IPA: [tʰɔj˩ wan˥ jɐn˩]
Southern Min
- Hokkien POJ: Tâi-oân-lâng
- Tâi-lô: Tâi-uân lâng
Eastern Min
- Fuzhou BUC: Dài-uăng ìng

Min name
- Traditional Chinese: 臺灣儂
- Simplified Chinese: 台湾侬
Transcriptions
Southern Min
- Hokkien POJ: Tâi-oân-lâng
- Tâi-lô: Tâi-uân lâng

Taiwanese people (Note: In local languages: Traditional Chinese script: 臺灣人; Mandarin Pinyin: Táiwān rén; Hokkien: Tâi-oân-lâng; Sixian Hakka: Thòi-vàn-ngìn; Matsu: Dài-uăng-nè̤ng), at the contemporary definition, generally refers to the citizens and nationals of the Republic of China (ROC) and those who reside in an overseas diaspora with ancestry from the Taiwan Area. The term also refers to natives or inhabitants of the island of Taiwan and its associated islands who may speak Sinitic languages (Mandarin, Hokkien, Hakka) or the indigenous Taiwanese languages as a mother tongue but share a common culture and national identity. After the retreat of the Republic of China government to Taiwan in 1949, the actual-controlled territories of the government were limited to the main island of Taiwan and Penghu, whose administration were transferred from Japan in 1945, along with a few outlying islands in Fuchien Province as territories that retained by the ROC after the Chinese civil war, which include Kinmen and Matsu Islands.

Taiwanese people as a demonym may broadly refer to the indigenous peoples of Kinmen and Matsu as they share the same national identity with people of Taiwan. However, the islanders of Kinmen and the Matsu may not consider the "Taiwanese" label to be accurate as these two islands are legally parts of Fuchien and not Taiwan. They maintain distinctive cultural identities from that of the Taiwanese, and prefer to be called "Kinmenese" and "Matsunese", respectively.

At least three competing (and occasionally overlapping) paradigms are used to identify someone as a Taiwanese person: nationalist criteria, self-identification (including the concept of "New Taiwanese") criteria and socio-cultural criteria. These standards are fluid and result from evolving social and political issues. The complexity resulting from competing and evolving standards is compounded by a larger dispute regarding Taiwan's identity, the political status of Taiwan and its potential de jure Taiwan independence or Cross-Strait Unification.

According to government figures, over 95% of Taiwan's population of 23.4 million consists of Han Taiwanese, while 2.3% are Austronesian Taiwanese indigenous peoples. The Han are often divided into three subgroups: the Hoklo, the Hakka, and waishengren (or "mainlanders"). The largest overseas diaspora of Taiwanese people are Taiwanese Americans in the United States.

Despite the wide use of the "four great ethnic groups" in public discourse as essentialized identities, the relationships between the peoples of Taiwan have been in a constant state of convergence and negotiation for centuries. According to Harrel and Huang, the distinction between non-aboriginal Taiwanese groups are "no longer definitive in cultural terms".

== Definitions of Taiwanese ==
The word "Taiwanese people" has multiple meanings and can refer to one of the following:

- All citizens of the Republic of China with household registration in the Taiwan (+ Streamlined Fujian) Free Area. This definition includes people living outside of Taiwan Province (Republic of China), including the peoples of the archipelagos of Kinmen, Matsu and Wuqiu (Kinmen), collectively part of Fujian Province (Republic of China) as well as other territories controlled by the Republic of China. Many of the people living in Kinmen, Matsu and Wuqiu are opposed to this definition, given that they view themselves as "Chinese from Fujian Province".
- All people living in Taiwan (or originating from Taiwan) who identify with the "Taiwanese" nationality in some form or another, rather than with another nationality such as the "Chinese" nationality. These people have views which are generally aligned with those of the Pan-Green (Political) Coalition. This definition excludes people who support Chinese Unification and whose views are aligned with those of the Pan-Blue (Political) Coalition (which includes most of the inhabitants of Kinmen, Matsu, and Wuqiu) as well as new immigrants.
- All people living in Taiwan (of Han Chinese descent) whose ancestors endured life under Japanese colonial rule (in Taiwan). These people are commonly referred to as "Taiwanese Benshengren" within Taiwan (Republic of China), as opposed to "Taiwanese Waishengren" (which are Chinese Mainlanders who migrated to Taiwan after 1945, as well as their descendants). This definition can also include the various Taiwanese indigenous peoples, who are ethnically Austronesian.
- All people who have historically lived in Taiwan, including people of ethnic Japanese, Dutch or Spanish descent (or various other ethnic ancestries) who historically colonized Taiwan or settled in Taiwan back when Taiwan was fully or partially controlled by the Empire of Japan, the Dutch Empire or the Spanish Empire, respectively.
- Only Taiwanese Indigenous peoples, who have lived in Taiwan for up to 6000 years. This definition excludes all people groups who have settled in Taiwan in "recent" history (the past 500 years), including the Han Chinese, the Manchus, the Japanese, the Dutch and the Spanish. This view is generally held by Chinese Mainlanders and by people living in Taiwan (Republic of China) whose views are aligned with the Pan-Blue Coalition, who do not agree with the view that the "Taiwanese Benshengren" should be allowed to self-identify as Taiwanese, given that they are "invaders" in Taiwan, rather than "natives".

== The history of Taiwanese identity ==
The earliest notion of a Taiwanese group identity emerged in the form of a national identity following the Qing dynasty's ceding of Taiwan to Japan in the Treaty of Shimonoseki in 1895 (Morris 2002:3–6). Prior to Japanese rule, residents of Taiwan developed relationships based on class solidarity and social connections rather than ethnic identity. Although Han often cheated Aborigines, they also married and supported one another against other residents of the same ethnic background. Taiwan was the site of frequent feuding based on ethnicity, lineage and place of origin (Lamley 1981; Lamley 1990:79; Shepherd 1993:310–323).

=== Japanese era ===
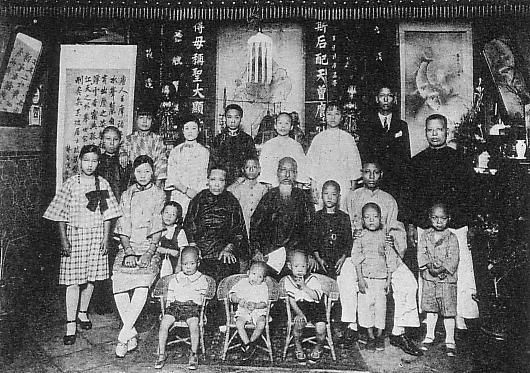
Taiwanese in the Japanese colonial era

In the face of the Japanese colonial hierarchy, the people of Taiwan were faced with the unequal binary relationship between colonizer/colonized. This duality between "one" and "other" was evident in the seven years of violence between the Japanese and groups of united anti-Japanese Han and Aborigines (Katz 2005). Only later did the Japanese attempt to incorporate Taiwanese into the Japanese identity as "loyal subjects", but the difference between the experience of the colonized and the colonizer polarized the two groups (Fujii 2006:70–73). The concept of "race" was utilized as a tool to confirm and facilitate Japanese political policies. A system of household registers (koseki) based on the notion of race to separate and define groups of subjects. From within the group of "non-Japanese" the government divided Han citizens into "Han" and "Hakka" based on their perception of linguistic and cultural differences. The Japanese also maintained the Qing era classification of aborigines as either "raw" or "cooked" (Brown 2004:8), which to the Japanese embodied the social ramification of ethnic origin and perceived loyalty to the empire (Wolf & Huang 1980:19).

=== Martial law era ===
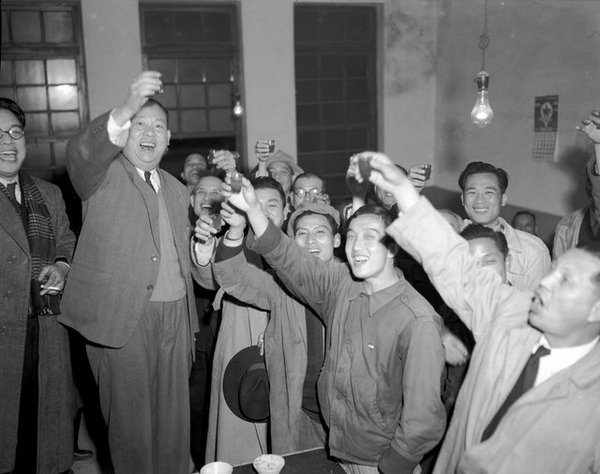
Non-Kuomintang politician Wu San-lien (2L) celebrated his landslide victory (65.5%) in the first-time Taipei city mayoral election in January 1951 with his supporters. Taipei has been the capital of Taiwan since December 1949.

In 1945, the Taiwanese faced a new unequal binary relationship when Taiwan entered the political sphere of the Republic of China (ROC). Shortly following the Kuomintang (KMT) arrival, however, social conflict erupted in the midst of rampant government corruption, soaring inflation and an increasing flow of immigrants from China (see February 28 Incident). The latter were preferred for jobs in the civil service as opposed to Taiwanese who were regarded as "untrustworthy"(Phillips 2003:8–9). Recurrent violent suppression of dissent also played an important role in enforcing a separate sense of "Taiwanese-ness" (Gates 1981:253–275).

The KMT lost the Chinese Civil War and retreated to Taiwan in 1949. However, Chiang Kai-shek intended to eventually return to mainland China and retake control of it. In order to do this, the KMT attempted to "sinicize" the Taiwanese people. KMT's Taiwan Garrison Commander Chen Yi stated that after 50 years of Japanese rule, "Taiwanese customs, thought, and language would have to gradually return to that of the Chinese people". The KMT believed that a centrally controlled curriculum would forge a unified national sentiment in Taiwan. They also believed education would help build a martial spirit and stimulate enough military, economic, political, and cultural strength not only to survive, but also to recover the mainland.

Under the KMT structure, "Taiwanese" became a strong "regional" identity. The term has often been used synonymously with "benshengren", a term which covered both Hokkien and Hakka whose ancestors arrived in Taiwan before the Japanese restrictions on immigration in 1895. "Taiwanese" was used in contrast with waishengren (mainlanders), who included the people who followed the KMT to Taiwan between 1945 and 1949 and their descendants. The government tended to stress provincial identities, with identification cards and passports issued until the late 1990s displaying one's ancestral province and county. During this period the terms "cooked" and "raw" Indigenous disappeared. The former "raw" Indigenous were termed Shandi Tongbao, Gaoshanzu (Mountain Race) or Gaoshan Tongbao (Mountain Compatriots).

=== Democratic era ===
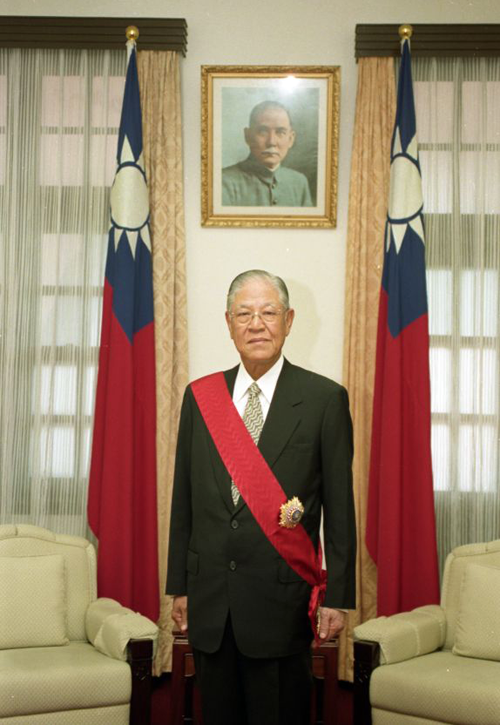
Lee Teng-hui became the first president of the Republic of China to be born in Taiwan. He was democratically elected in 1996.

With Taiwan's political liberalization in the 1970s and 1980s, encouraged by Taiwan's changing international status, the concept of a "Taiwanese people" became politicized by opponents of the KMT. The tangwai movement deployed concepts of "Taiwanese identity" against the authoritarian KMT government, often using extreme tactics to build a short-term ethno-centric opposition to the KMT.

The campaign saw resonance with the people of Taiwan and the term "Taiwanese" has been used by politicians of all parties to refer to the electorate in an effort to secure votes. The concept of a separate Taiwanese identity has become such an integral factor to the election culture in Taiwan, that identifying as a Taiwanese has become essential to being elected in Taiwan (Corcuff 2002:243–249). These political reforms have since been credited with the renewal of interest in Taiwanese history, culture, and identity.

After the lifting of martial law in 1987, the Hoklo people, the largest ethnic group in Taiwan, were allowed to articulate their own interests and the idea emerged that Taiwan should be built primarily as a Hoklo nation based on Hoklo identity and culture. They advocated for the replacement of Mandarin Chinese, removal of geography lessons focused on the Yellow River and the Great Wall of China, historical focus on the Second Sino-Japanese War, and Beijing Opera as representative of culture. This was opposed by other ethnic groups such as the Hakka people and Taiwanese indigenous peoples who fought against using Hokkien as the national language and narratives of Han colonization of Taiwan. As a result, the Hoklo became more supportive of a multicultural policy that focused on equality of languages and ethnicity. However others were skeptical and said that the Hoklo do not have a strong ethnic identity since they define themselves and their language as primarily Taiwanese. The Hakka and indigenous peoples of Taiwan have also been redefined as "Taiwanese" in the following period. There have been criticisms of this movement as politically motivated. Authors such as Shih Chih-yu and Yih-jye Hwang described Taiwan's multiculturalism as a discursive construction of identity and that Taiwan identity only existed in discourse without a fixed, essential, or permanent state. There were strong political inclinations underlying both Taiwanese identity as well as pan-Chinese (Han) identity. They criticized the indigenous wing of the KMT for arguing that the Taiwanese were not Chinese and that pro-independence leaders were trying to generate a Taiwanese national consciousness through deliberately redrawing ethnic boundaries and rewriting histories. The division of Hoklo, Hakka and Mainlanders, originally introduced by the Hoklo, has gained popular support within Taiwanese society.

=== New Taiwanese ===
The term "New Taiwanese" (新臺灣人) was coined by former President of the Republic of China, Lee Teng-hui in 1995 to bridge the ethnic cleavage that followed the February 28 Incident of 1947 and characterized the frigid relations between waishengren and benshengren during forty years of martial law. Although originally aimed at the successive generations of Taiwanese with mainlander ancestry, it has been further articulated by Lee and other political and social leaders to refer to any person who loves Taiwan and is committed to calling Taiwan home. Although critics have called the "New Taiwanese Concept" a political ploy to win votes from benshengren who regarded the KMT as an alien regime, it has remained an important factor in the dialectic between ethnic identities in Taiwan. Despite being adopted early on by former Provincial Governor James Soong (1997) and later by, then Taipei mayoral candidate Ma Ying-jeou (1999), the term has since been dropped from contemporary political rhetoric (Corcuff 2002:186–188).

=== Multicultural present ===
The increasing number of marriages between Taiwanese and other countries creates a problem for the rigid definitions of ethnic identity used by both the ROC and the PRC when discussing Taiwan (Harrell 1995). In one-fourth of all marriages in Taiwan today, one partner will be from another country and one out of every twelve children is born to a family of mixed parentage. As Taiwan's birthrate is among the lowest in the world, this contingent is playing an increasingly important role in changing Taiwan's demographic makeup. By 2010, this social-cultural group of people is typically known as "Taiwan's new resident" (Chinese: 臺灣新住民; pinyin: Táiwān xīn zhùmín; lit. 'New Residents of Taiwan'; Mandarin pronunciation: [tʰǎɪ wán ɕin ʈ͡ʂu min]).

== Current state of Taiwanese identity ==
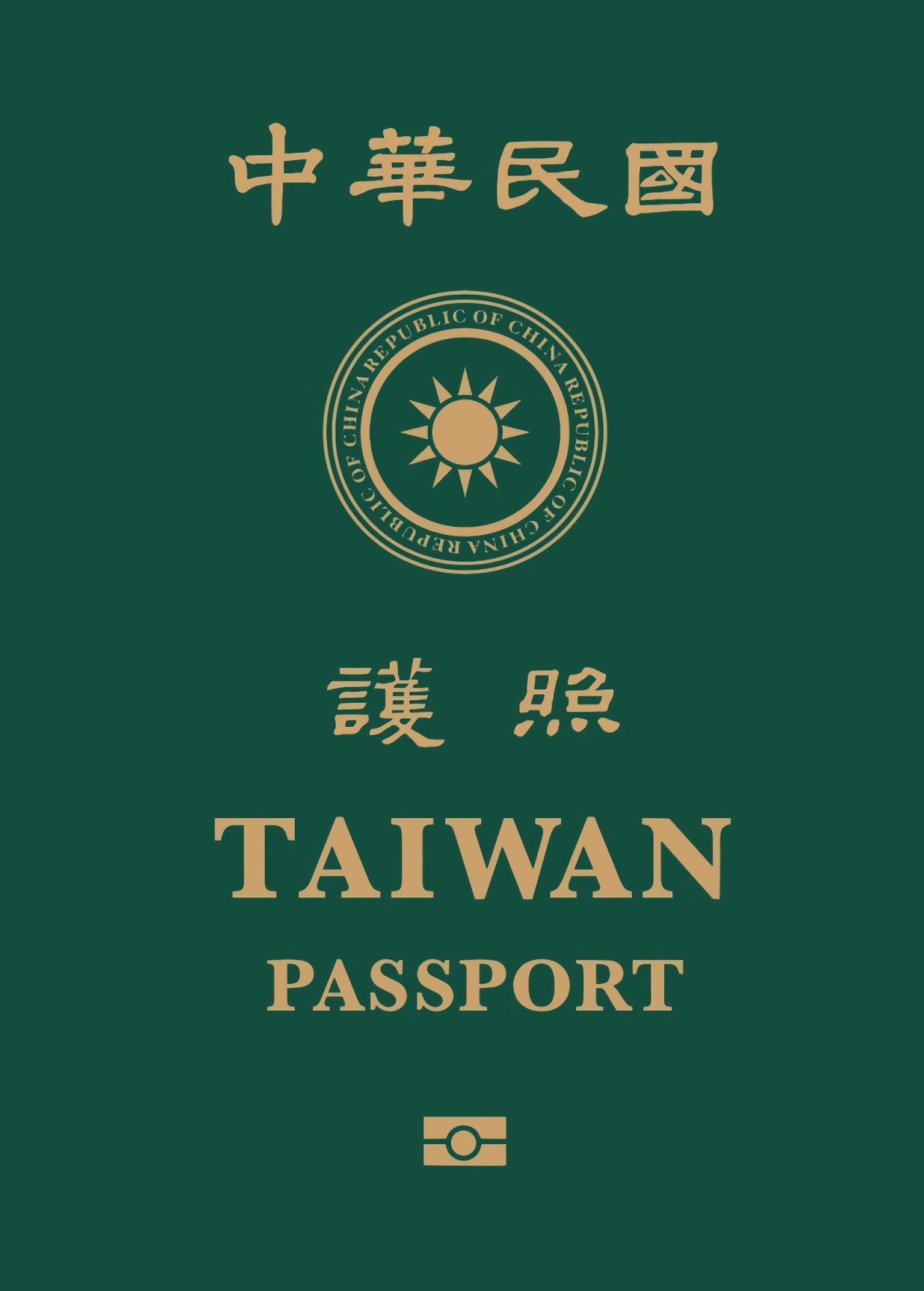
A passport issued by the Republic of China, with the word "Taiwan" in Latin script on the cover, but without the corresponding Han characters.

National Chengchi University has conducted annual polls since 1991 on self-identity in Taiwan excluding Kinmen and Matsu. In 1991, 17.6% of the respondents identified as Taiwanese (臺灣人) only, 25.5% as Chinese (中國人; Zhōngguó rén) only, 46.4% as both. In 2000 the numbers were 36.9% Taiwanese, 12.5% Chinese, 44.1% both. In 2010, 52.7% identified as Taiwanese, 3.8% as Chinese, 39.8% as both. In 2020, 64.3% identified as Taiwanese, 2.6% as Chinese, 29.9% as both. As the word Zhongguo ren in Taiwan has become associated with PRC citizenship, it reflects a divergence between civic and national identities. From 2014, to 2018 and 2020 to 2022, the number of those identifying solely as "Taiwanese" declined (from 60.6 to 54.5 and from 64.3 to 60.8, respectively). Researchers analysing this phenomenon found that the performance of the ruling political party influenced the way people identified. The study found that when the Democratic Progressive Party was believed to have governed well, the number of people identifying solely as "Taiwanese" increased, and when the Kuomintang was believed to have governed well, the number of people expressing affiliation to a "Chinese and Taiwanese" identity increased.

The discrepancy in identity becomes larger when polls only give the two options of "Taiwanese" versus "Chinese". In June 2008, a TVBS poll found that 68% of the respondents identify themselves as "Taiwanese" while 18% would call themselves "Chinese". In 2015, a poll conducted by the Taiwan Braintrust showed that about 90 percent of the population would identify themselves as Taiwanese rather than Chinese.

In a 2002 poll by the Democratic Progressive Party, over 50% of the respondents considered themselves "Taiwanese" only, up from less than 20% in 1991 (Dreyer 2003). Polls conducted by the Ministry of Foreign Affairs (MOFA) in 2001 found that 70% of Taiwanese would support a name change of the country to Taiwan if the island could no longer be referred to as the Republic of China.

In 2006, Wu Nai-teh of Academia Sinica said that "many Taiwanese are still confused about identity, and are easily affected by political, social, and economic circumstances." However, since then the sense of a collective Taiwanese identity has continued to increase despite fluctuations in support for pro-independence political parties. This has been cited as evidence that the concept of Taiwanese identity is not the product of local political manipulation, but an actual phenomenon of ethnic and sociopolitical identities (Corcuff 2002:137–149, 207; Hsiau 2005:157–170).

The 2023 documentary "Nous sommes Taïwan" (French for "We are Taiwan") by Pierre Haski explored the current state of Taiwanese identity.

In 2023 the LA Times wrote "Taiwan's odyssey to establish its distinct identity is manifold and complex. It won't be worldwide recognition of any single component of the culture, history, politics or food that accomplishes this but a combination of them all."

== Major socio-cultural subgroups ==
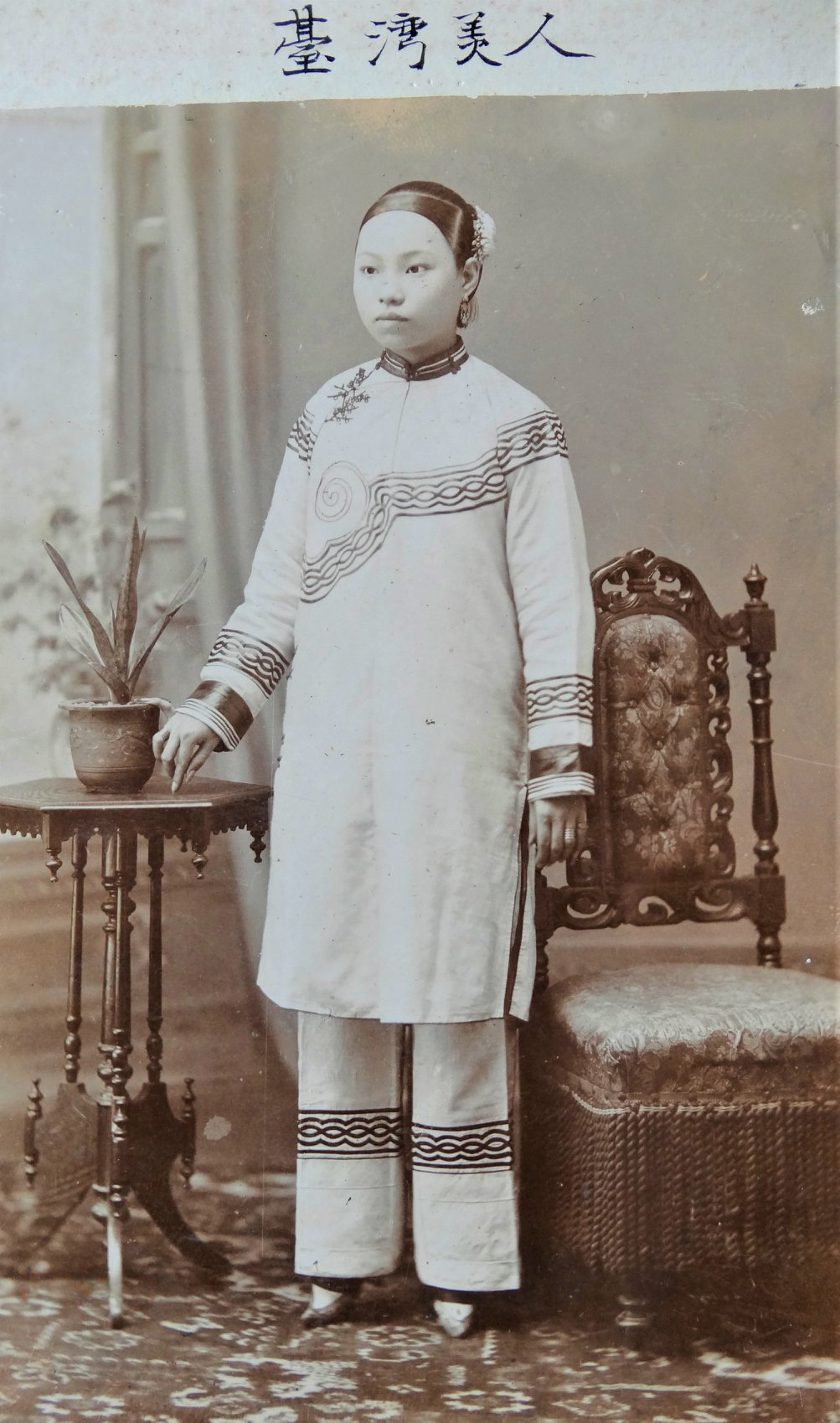
"Beauty of Taiwan" per caption, circa 1900

According to governmental statistics, over 95% of Taiwan's 23.4 million people are Han Chinese, of which the majority includes descendants of early Hoklo immigrants who arrived from Fujian in large numbers starting in the 17th century. A significant minority of the Han group are the Hakka people, who comprise about 15% of the total population. The Hakkas emigrated chiefly from eastern Guangdong, speak Hakka Chinese, and originally took up residence in hilly areas. The so-called waishengren (lit. extra-provincial person, sometimes translated "mainlander") Han subgroup includes and descends from the 1.2 million people who migrated to Taiwan from China between the Surrender of Japan in 1945 to the Nationalist retreat to Taiwan following the communist victory in the Chinese Civil War in 1949. The non-Han Austronesian population of Taiwanese Indigenous peoples comprises about 2.3% of the population and have inhabited the island for millennia.

Migration to Taiwan from southern Asia began approximately 12,000 BC, but large-scale migration to Taiwan did not occur until the 18th to the beginning of the 20th century as a result of political and economic chaos in mainland China. The first large scale migration occurred as a result of the Manchu invasion and conquest of China, overthrowing the Ming dynasty and establishing the Qing dynasty, which was established in 1644 and remained until 1911.

In 1624, the Dutch East India Company established an outpost in modern-day Anping, Tainan in southern Taiwan after expelling the Spanish. The Dutch soon realized Taiwan's potential as a colony for trading deer hide, venison, rice, and sugar. However, Indigenous were not interested in developing the land and transporting settlers from Europe would be too costly. Due to the resulting labor shortage, the Dutch hired Han farmers from across the Taiwan Strait who fled the Manchu invasion of Ming dynasty China.

Koxinga brought along many more Chinese settlers during the Siege of Fort Zeelandia in which he expelled the Dutch. Migration of male laborers from Fujian, steadily increased into the 18th and 19th century. In time, this migration and the gradual removal of ethnic markers (coupled with the acculturation, intermarriage and assimilation of plains Indigenous with the Han) resulted in the widespread adoption of Han patterns of behavior making Taiwanese Han the ethnic majority.

It was not until the Japanese arrival in 1895 that Taiwanese first developed a collective Taiwanese identity in contrast to that of the colonizing Japanese. When the Chinese Civil War broke out between Kuomintang nationalists and the Chinese communists in 1945, there was another mass migration of people from mainland China to Taiwan fleeing the communists. These migrants are known as the mainland Chinese.

=== Indigenous peoples ===
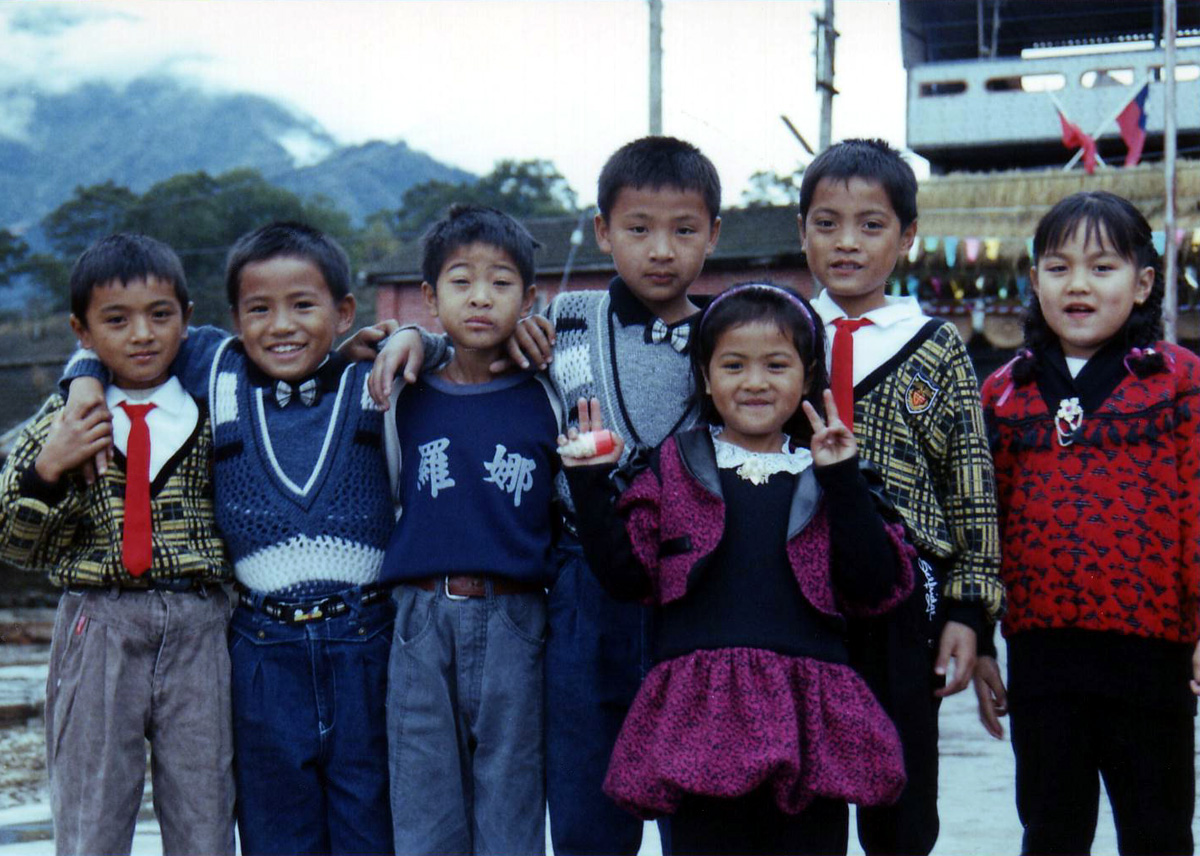
A group of Taiwanese indigenous children

Taiwanese indigenous peoples are the indigenous peoples of Taiwan. They speak languages that belongs to the Austronesian language family, and are culturally, genetically and linguistically closely related to the ethnic groups of Maritime Southeast Asia and Oceania. Their ancestors are believed to have been living on the islands for approximately 8,000 years before major Han Chinese immigration began in the 17th century (Blust 1999). Taiwan's Austronesian speakers were traditionally distributed over much of the island's rugged central mountain range and concentrated in villages along the alluvial plains. Today, the bulk of the contemporary Taiwanese indigenous population reside in the mountains and the major cities. The total population of recognized indigenous peoples on Taiwan is approximately 533,600, or approximately 2.28% of Taiwan's population. The cities of Yilan, Hualien, and Taitung are known for their communities. In the 1990s, Taiwanese indigenous peoples, which had traditionally viewed themselves as separate groups, united under the singular ethnonym '原住民' or 'indigenous peoples' (Stainton 1999).

=== Hoklo ===
The Hoklo people of Taiwan and Penghu speak Taiwanese Hokkien and mostly originated from Fujian (specifically Quanzhou, Zhangzhou, Xiamen and Kinmen). The Hoklos account for about 70% of the total population today. During Qing rule, some Hoklo men took aboriginal brides. Some of the plains aboriginals also adopted Chinese customs and language so as to be indistinguishable from the Han. Thus, many who categorize themselves as Hoklo have some degree of indigenous ancestry.

It is possible to find families where the older members still identify themselves as lowland aborigine, while the rest of the family may identify as Hoklo. Among the Hoklo, the common idiom, "has Tangshan father, no Tangshan mother" (Chinese: 有唐山公、無唐山媽; Pe̍h-ōe-jī: Ū Tn̂g-soaⁿ kong, bô Tn̂g-soaⁿ má) refers how the Han people crossing the Taiwan Strait were mostly male, whereas their offspring would be through marriage with female Taiwanese aborigines.

Within the Taiwanese Han Hoklo community itself, differences in culture indicate the degree to which mixture with aboriginals took place, with most pure Hoklo Han in Northern Taiwan having almost no Aboriginal admixture, which is limited to Hoklo Han in Southern Taiwan. Plains aboriginals who were mixed and assimilated into the Hoklo Han population at different stages were differentiated by the historian Melissa J. Brown between "short-route" and "long-route". The ethnic identity of assimilated Plains Aboriginals in the immediate vicinity of Tainan was still known since a pure Hoklo Taiwanese girl was warned by her mother to stay away from them. The insulting name "fan" was used against Plains Aborigines by the Taiwanese, and the Hoklo Taiwanese speech was forced upon Aborigines like the Pazeh. Hoklo Taiwanese has replaced Pazeh and driven it to near extinction. Aboriginal status has been requested by Plains Aboriginals.

The term "Chinese Formosans" has been used to imply Hoklo descendants, though this term has also been used to denote the Taiwanese people (whether of pure or mixed origin) in contrast to the Japanese and mountain aborigines.

The deep-rooted hostility between Taiwanese Indigenous peoples and (Taiwanese) Hoklo, and the Aboriginal communities' effective KMT networks contribute to Aboriginal skepticism against the DPP and the Indigenous tendency to vote for the KMT. Some aboriginal representatives such as May Chin, also known as Kao Chin Su-mei, ridiculed the "Han-native" Taiwanese independence supporters, and advocated for unification. She criticized the Japanese colonial period, probably because of her blue-camp affiliation, but ignored the period of KMT rule under which the aboriginals also suffered.

=== Hakka ===
Taiwan's Hakka people descend largely from Hakka who migrated from southern and northern Guangdong to Taiwan around the end of the Ming dynasty and the beginning of the Qing dynasty (ca. 1644).

The Taiwanese Hakka communities, although arriving to Taiwan from mountains of eastern Guangdong and western Fujian, have also likely mixed through intermarriage with lowland Indigenous as well. Hakka family trees are known for identifying the male ancestors by their ethnic Hakka heritage while leaving out information on the identity of the female ancestors. Also, during the process of intermarriage and assimilation, many of the lowland Indigenous and their families adopted Hoklo and Hakka family names. Much of this happened in Taiwan prior to the Japanese colonization of Taiwan, so that by the time of the Japanese colonization, most of the population that the Japanese classified as "Chinese" Hoklo and "Chinese" Hakka were in truth already of mixed ancestry. Physical features of both Taiwanese aborigine and Chinese can be found amongst the Taiwanese mainstream today.

=== Mainlander ===
"Mainlanders" or waishengren refer to the post-war immigrants (and sometimes also their descendants) who followed the KMT to Taiwan between 1945 and 1950. The descendants of mainlanders settled first within the heart of large urban centers in Taiwan such as Taipei, Taichung, or Kaohsiung. High numbers of government officials and civil servants who followed the KMT to Taiwan and occupied the positions of the colonial government moved into the official dormitories and residences built by the Japanese for civil servants. The ghettoization of mainlander communities exacerbated the divisions imagined by non-mainlander groups, and stymied cultural integration and assimilation into mainstream Taiwanese culture (Gates 1981). Nationalization campaigns undertaken by the KMT established an official "culture", which reflected the KMT government's own preference for what it considered authentic Chinese culture. This excluded many of the local Taiwanese practices and local cultures, including the diverse cultures brought to Taiwan by the mainlanders from all parts of China (Wachman 1994). Unlike the Hoklo and Hakka of Taiwan, who felt excluded by the new government, the mainlanders and their families supported the nationalists and embraced the official "culture" as their own, with "national culture" being taught in school (Wilson 1970). The mainlanders used their embrace of Nationalist culture to identify themselves as the authentic Chinese people of Taiwan.

In addition to the Han people, there were also small numbers of Mongols, Hui, Manchu and other ethnic minorities among the Waishengren.

=== Burmese Chinese ===
Burmese Chinese have settled mostly in Zhonghe District, located in Taipei County. The job boom in the factories there has attracted an estimated 40,000 Burmese Chinese immigrants (c. 2008) which are 10% of the city's population. This is "believed to be the largest Burmese Chinese community outside of Burma."

=== New residents or immigrants ===
New residents in Taiwan (Chinese: 臺灣新住民; pinyin: Táiwān xīn zhùmín; lit. 'New Residents of Taiwan') are a group that consists of mainly new residents, originally from other nations, who have either migrated to Taiwan or inter-married with a local Taiwanese. The majority of new residents originated from Vietnam, Indonesia, Thailand, and Philippines. As of 2018, there are more than 710,000 foreign labors employed in Taiwan in both blue and white collar industries. Taiwanese society has a surprisingly high degree of diversity. According to Ethnologue, published by US-based SIL international, over 20 living languages are found on the island as of 2016. These languages are spoken by the many Austronesian and Han ethnolinguistic groups that comprise the people of Taiwan.

=== Enmity between ethnic groups on Taiwan ===
The deep-rooted hostility between Indigenous and (Taiwanese) Hoklo, and the Indigenous communities' effective KMT networks, contribute to Indigenous skepticism against the Democratic Progressive Party (DPP) and the Indigenous tendency to vote for the KMT.

== Overseas Taiwanese ==
Overseas Taiwanese (Chinese: 海外臺灣人), also called "people of Taiwanese descent" (Chinese: 臺裔; pinyin: taiyi), are people who are living outside of Taiwan but are of Taiwanese ancestry or descent. Overseas Taiwanese may live in other territories such as the People's Republic of China and are not necessarily Taiwan nationals.

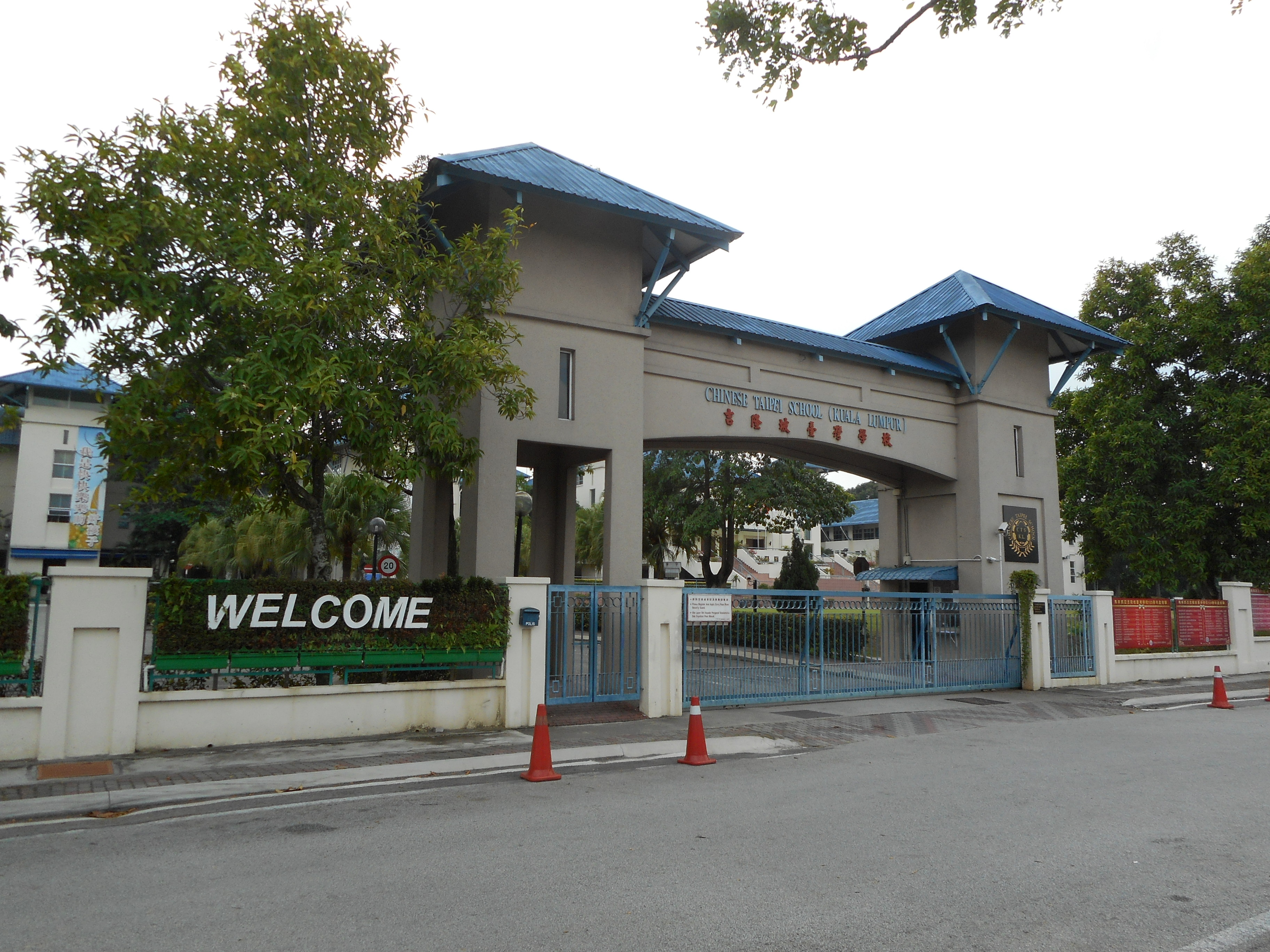
Chinese Taipei School in Malaysia.

=== Taiwanese living in the People's Republic of China ===
Starting the 1980s, some Taiwanese businesspeople (Taishang) started to open factories and moved into the Mainland China for its lower labor-costs and tax-deduction policies enacted by Chinese government towards Taiwanese. Thus, manufacture-intensive cities like Kunshan and Dongguan had aggregated a significant amount of Taiwanese population, mostly Taishang and their families since then. In November 2014 the Taipei Times cited an estimate of 1 million Taiwanese living within China (PRC), i.e. "mainland China".

Historically, most Taiwanese people originated from China (under regimes before the PRC). Taiwanese people (of Chinese descent) have traveled between China and Taiwan throughout history. Taiwanese Indigenous peoples also have a minor presence in China (PRC). After the Treaty of Shimonoseki was signed, with Taiwan (previously a Chinese province/prefecture) being ceded by Qing China to the Japanese Empire, an expatriate/refugee community of Taiwanese in China was created.

The original Taiwanese Communist Party was closely affiliated with the Chinese Communist Party (CCP) prior to the establishment of the People's Republic of China (PRC) in 1949. The failed party would later evolve into the Taiwan Democratic Self-Government League, one of eight officially-recognised political parties within China (PRC) which is ultimately subservient to the CCP. Many members of this party have been Taiwanese people residing in China (PRC), i.e. "mainland China".

=== Taiwanese Japanese ===
From 1895 until 1945, Taiwan was controlled by the Japanese Empire as a colony/dependency. It was known as "Japanese Formosa". Due to this period of close administrative connection between Taiwan and Japan, many Taiwanese people have been living in Japan for several generations, such as Momofuku Ando, the inventor of "instant ramen (noodles)", whose invention has been praised by Japanese people as one of the country's greatest national inventions.

The Taiwanese community in Japan tends to be treated separately from the Chinese (PRC) community, both officially and socially, and is quite close to the local Japanese population. However, controversies have arisen due to dual-citizenship of ethnic-Taiwanese politicians in Japan, e.g. Renhō, since Japan doesn't technically recognise the Republic of China on Taiwan as a legitimate country, and since Japan doesn't allow dual-citizenship, especially not in politics.

Japanese people tend to have positive views towards Taiwanese people due to shared history, shared culture, shared values, and the close ties between Taiwan and Japan. Following the 2011 Tōhoku earthquake and tsunami in Japan, Taiwan was the most prominent humanitarian contributor, donating US$252 million in combined aid under then-ROC-president Ma Ying-jeou's administration. This is one major reason why Japanese people tend to have favourable views of Taiwan.

Historically, Zheng Cheng-gong (also known as Koxinga), who established the Kingdom of Tungning in Taiwan, was born to a Japanese mother and Chinese father. Chiang Wei-kuo, the second (adopted) son of Chiang Kai-shek (arguably the most well-known Taiwanese and ROC politician outside of Taiwan/China), was also born to a Japanese mother and Chinese father.

=== Taiwanese Americans (United States) ===
In the United States, there are 230,382 to 919,000 people of Taiwanese descent living there. They are mostly concentrated in California, New York, and Texas.

According to Census data from 2010, Taiwanese Americans have the highest education level of any ethnic group in the United States, if they are not classified together with Chinese Americans.

=== Taiwanese Canadians ===
There are over 91,000 Taiwanese people in Canada, mainly living in the provinces of British Columbia and Ontario.

=== Taiwanese Australians ===
The complete number of Taiwanese Australians is unknown since the Australian Census only records foreign ethnicities for the first two generations (i.e. the number of 3rd-gen Taiwanese Australians and beyond is unknown). However, it is known that there are around 45,000–55,000 Taiwanese Australians who are 1st-gen or 2nd-gen, and these people currently comprise around 90–95% of Australia's ethnically-Taiwanese population. In modern times, Australians of Taiwanese descent are mostly concentrated around the cities of Brisbane, Melbourne, and Sydney, with significant populations in other major Australian cities.

== Genetic studies ==
The Hoklo and Hakka linguistic groups, which statistically make up the majority of Taiwan's population, can trace their historical and cultural roots to Hokkien and Hakka speaking peoples from China, predominantly the southern provinces of Fujian and Guangdong. The original migrations from China were male-dominated as they came as laborers under contract to the Dutch, so there is a belief in Taiwan that there was considerable intermarriage with women from Plains indigenous peoples. In 2007, a study by Marie Lin reported that the human leukocyte antigen typing study and mitochondrial DNA analysis demonstrated that 85% of the Taiwanese Han population had some degree of indigenous origin. However, this study was criticized by other researchers and refuted by subsequent genetic studies.

Not long after Lin's 2007 publication, several academics pointed out errors in Lin's statistical analysis, and questioned why some of her numbers contradicted each other. Subsequent full genome studies using large sample sizes and comparing thousands of single nucleotide polymorphisms have come to the conclusion that Taiwanese Han people are primarily of mainland Chinese descent and have only very limited genetic admixture from the indigenous population.

A 2009 doctoral dissertation questions Lin's findings and claims that "the great number of Han immigrants after the 18th century is the main reason to consider that the early genetic contribution from Plains Indigenes to Taiwanese Han has been largely diluted and no longer exists in any meaningful way." The author, Shu-Juo Chen, called the belief that the majority of Taiwan's population have indigenous ancestry the "myth of indigenous genes." The lack of a totally complete and definite set of genetic record of Plains indigenous people, or conclusive understanding of their proto-Austronesian roots, further complicates the use of genetic data (Blust 1988). It is important to mention that most Taiwanese Han descend from immigrants from southern China and that the southern Han Chinese people already have ancient Austronesian admixture (see Baiyue people).

The narrative of widespread intermarriage between Han men and indigenous women has also been challenged by Su-Jen Huang in a 2013 paper. According to Huang, intermarriage only involved a small minority of Han males. Historical sources only report men outnumbering women but not widespread intermarriage between Han men and indigenous women. Only specific cases of intermarriage are mentioned while historical accounts indicate that the majority of Han men went back to the mainland to seek marriage. The gender imbalance also only lasted until the end of the early Qing period. Due to mass migration, within a few decades, the Han population vastly outnumbered the indigenous people so that even if intermarriage did happen it would have been impossible to meet the demand. The fact that indigenous tribes survived all the way up until Japanese colonization indicates that indigenous women did not marry with Han men en masse.

A 2016 study by Chen et al. found that the Taiwanese Han shared a common genetic background with Han Chinese populations worldwide but were quite distant from Taiwanese Austronesians. The Taiwanese Han Chinese clustered into three cline groups: 5% were of northern Han Chinese ancestry, 79.9% were of southern Han Chinese ancestry, and 14.5% belonged to a third (T) group. The southern Han Chinese were descended from an admixture of northern Han Chinese and the indigenous peoples (Baiyue) of southern China. The T group individuals were genetically distinct from neighbouring Southeast Asians and Taiwanese Austronesian tribes but were similar to other southern Han Chinese. The T group individuals may have experienced evolutionary events independent from the other southern Han.

A 2021 study by Lo et al. revealed that most Taiwanese Han had considerable proportions of Austronesian-related ancestry. However, this Austronesian-related ancestry was also observable in other Han Chinese populations in mainland China and among Chinese Singaporeans. The researchers suggested that this ancient Austronesian-related ancestry arose from admixture events between Han Chinese and pre-Austronesian populations (Baiyue) in mainland China. This did not rule out more recent admixture as the wide range in the proportion of Austronesian ancestry (0.1–62%) may be attributed to more recent admixture, but only one person out of the five hundred Taiwanese Han individuals examined was grouped closer to the Dusun people, who are closer to the Taiwanese indigenous peoples than Sino-Tibetan populations). There were highly distinct patterns of genetic structure in two Taiwanese indigenous populations (Ami and Atayal) in comparison to the Taiwanese Han populations (Hakka and Hokkien). The study's conclusion was that Island Southeast Asian (ISEA) ancestry was introduced in the ancestors of Taiwanese Han before they migrated to Taiwan. Overall, Taiwanese Han have Southeastern ancestry (average 59%, range 24–64%), represented by the Hmong, Northern ancestry (average 24%, range 8–41%) and ISEA ancestry (average 15%, range 0.1% to 62%). They also cluster the most with Cantonese people and Chinese Singaporeans among the Sino-Tibetan-speaking populations. Lin herself helped co-author this paper despite it contradicting her previous claims.

Nevertheless, Lin's early research has been continuously used by many Taiwanese independence activists to build a Taiwanese identity based on genetics. Activists have used Lin's findings to argue the view that the majority of Taiwanese who did not descend from migrants from the Chinese Civil War are not descendants of Han Chinese but rather descendants of Plains indigenous peoples; and therefore Taiwan should not be considered as part of a Chinese state. However, this position has faced political strain. Taiwanese Plains indigenous people who have suffered racial and cultural assimilation often despise these so called "blood nationalists", whom they view as pushing a political agenda by claiming indigenous status. Alak Akatuang, secretary of the Pingpu (Plains) Indigenous Peoples Cultural Association, said that the pan-green camp used the indigenous peoples to create a national identity for Taiwan, but the idea that Taiwanese people are not overwhelmingly descended from Han settlers was false. According to Akatuang, Taiwan's independence shouldn't be established on the idea of blood relations and these people "ignore scientific evidence because they want to believe they are different from China." This harmed the legitimacy of the Pingpu movement for recognition and reparations, and they considered it deeply insulting: "The Pingpu were the first of Taiwan's Indigenous peoples to face colonization. After the Han people came, they stole our land. They murdered our ancestors. Then after a few hundred years, they said we were the same people. Do you think a Pingpu person can accept this?"

Other studies show genetic affinities between Taiwanese Han and Kinh Vietnamese and also, genetic input from western Indonesians and other Mainland Southeast Asians, reflecting ancient trade.

== See also ==
- Taiwanese indigenous peoples
- Demographics of Taiwan
- Han Taiwanese
- Overseas Taiwanese
- Sinocentrism
- Sinicization
- De-Sinicization
- Taiwanese nationalism
- Taiwanese nationality law
- National identification card (Taiwan)
- Taiwan passport
