= Nationalism in Taiwan =

Nationalism in Taiwan may refer to the following:

- Taiwanese nationalism, a form of nationalism asserting Taiwan as an independent Taiwanese nation
- Chinese nationalism#In Taiwan, a form of nationalism asserting Taiwan as a province within the Chinese nation
