= Jerry Yang (disambiguation) =

Jerry Yang (born 1968) is the co-founder and former CEO of Yahoo! Inc.

Jerry Yang may also refer to:

- Jerry Yang (poker player) (born 1967)
- Xiangzhong Yang or Jerry Yang (1959–2009), biotechnology scientist who worked on cloning
