= Luoding =

Luoding 罗定市 Loting
- County-level & Sub-prefectural city
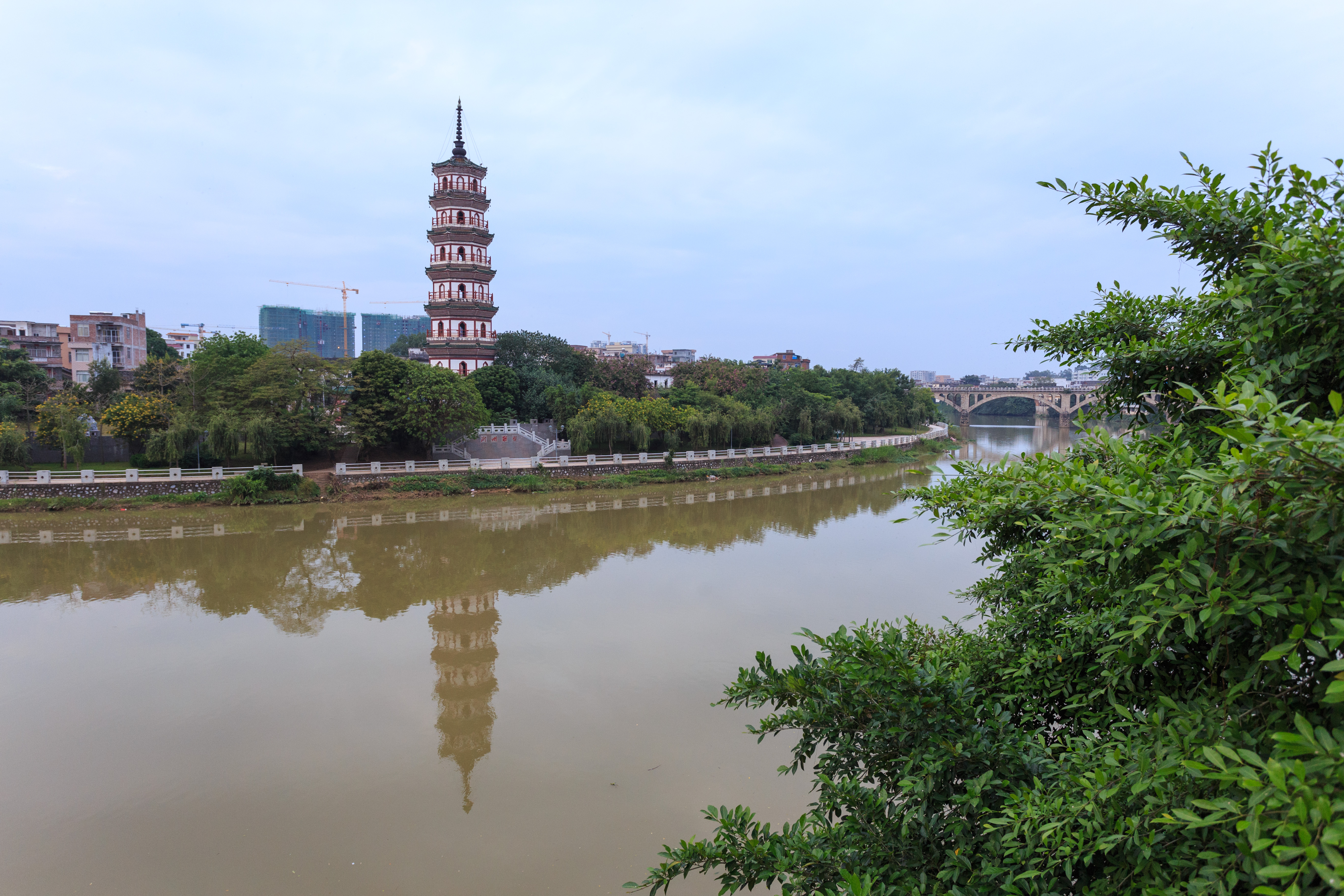

- Location in Guangdong
- Coordinates: 22°46′08″N 111°34′11″E
- Country: People's Republic of China
- Province: Guangdong
- Prefecture-level city: Yunfu

Area
  - Total: 2,300 km^{2} (890 sq mi)

Population (2020)
  - Total: 936,931
  - Density: 410/km^{2} (1,100/sq mi)
- Time zone: UTC+8 (China Standard)

Luoding
- Simplified Chinese: 罗定
- Traditional Chinese: 羅定
- Hanyu Pinyin: Luódìng
- Postal: Loting
Transcriptions
Standard Mandarin
- Hanyu Pinyin: Luódìng
- Gwoyeu Romatzyh: Luodinq
- Wade–Giles: Lo^{2}-ting^{4}
- IPA: [lwǒ.tîŋ]

Luoding (罗定), is a county-level city in the northwestern part of Guangdong province (Yuebei), South China. It is administered as part of the prefecture-level city of Yunfu.

== History ==
As early as 10,000 years ago, there were ancient people inhabited within Luoding City. It wasn't until 1577 when the Luoding Prefecture, overseeing what would be the city and its surrounding areas, would be officially established following the pacification of the Yao Rebellion, leading to the original Shuangshi County to become elevated and renamed. However, in 1912, the Guangzhaoluo Circuit that administered Luoding Prefecture would be abolished, renaming the prefecture to Luoding County.

Culturally, the Luoding County was formed through a diverse integration of primarily Baiyue and Han cultures, but featured Guangfu, Hakka, Minnan, and Chaoshan traditions as well. Through long-term migration, especially from Han Chinese immigrants, the county would develop a rich economy based on iron smelting, indigo, rice, and Chinese cinnamon production. The area is recognized as one of the birthplaces of Lingnan Culture and is home to several archaeological sites, including the monument of the Long Anyan Grottoes (龍盦巖石窟) rock carving.

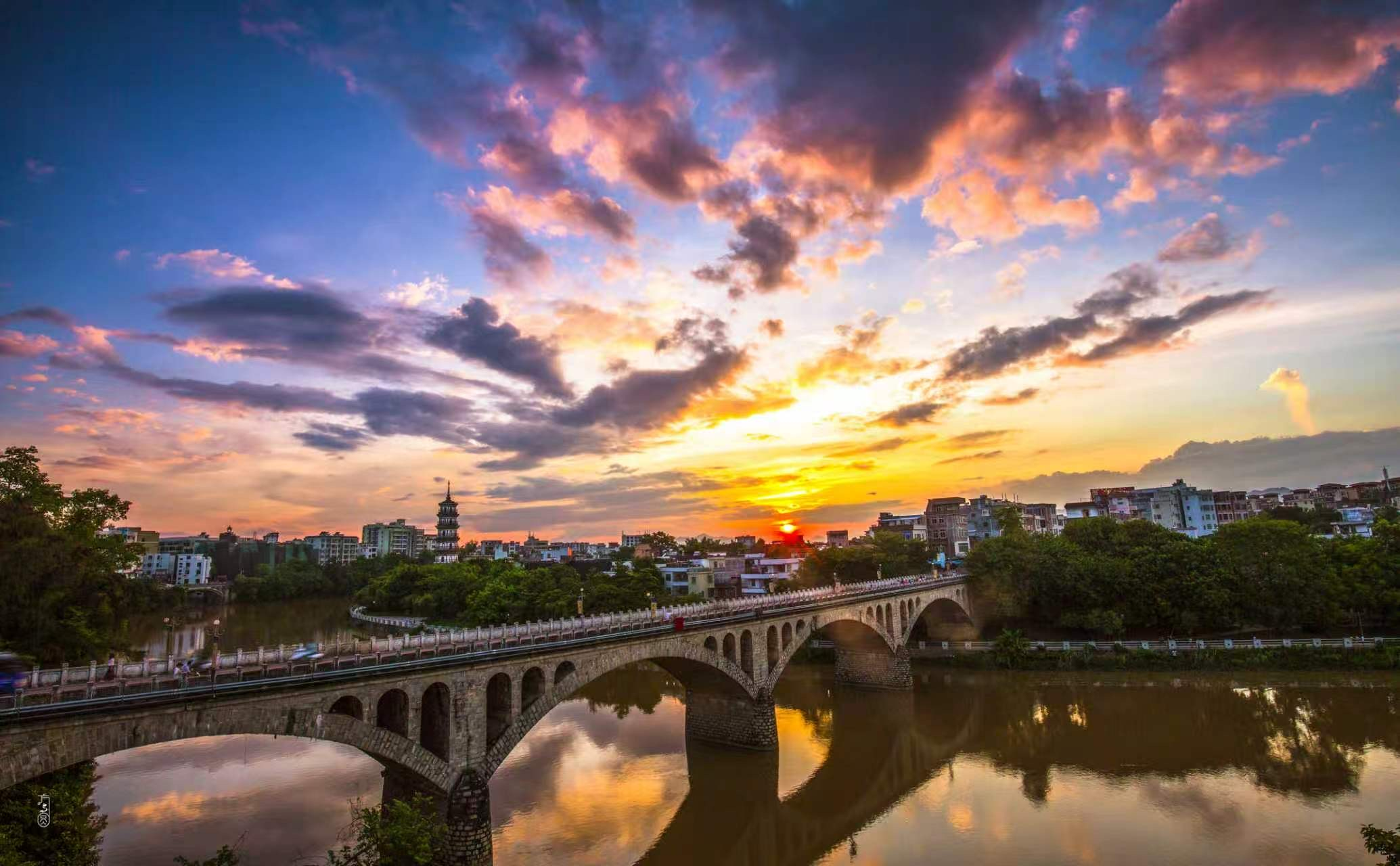
Scenery of the bridge and area behind the Luoding Wenta Pagoda, 方与圆 2026

== Geography ==
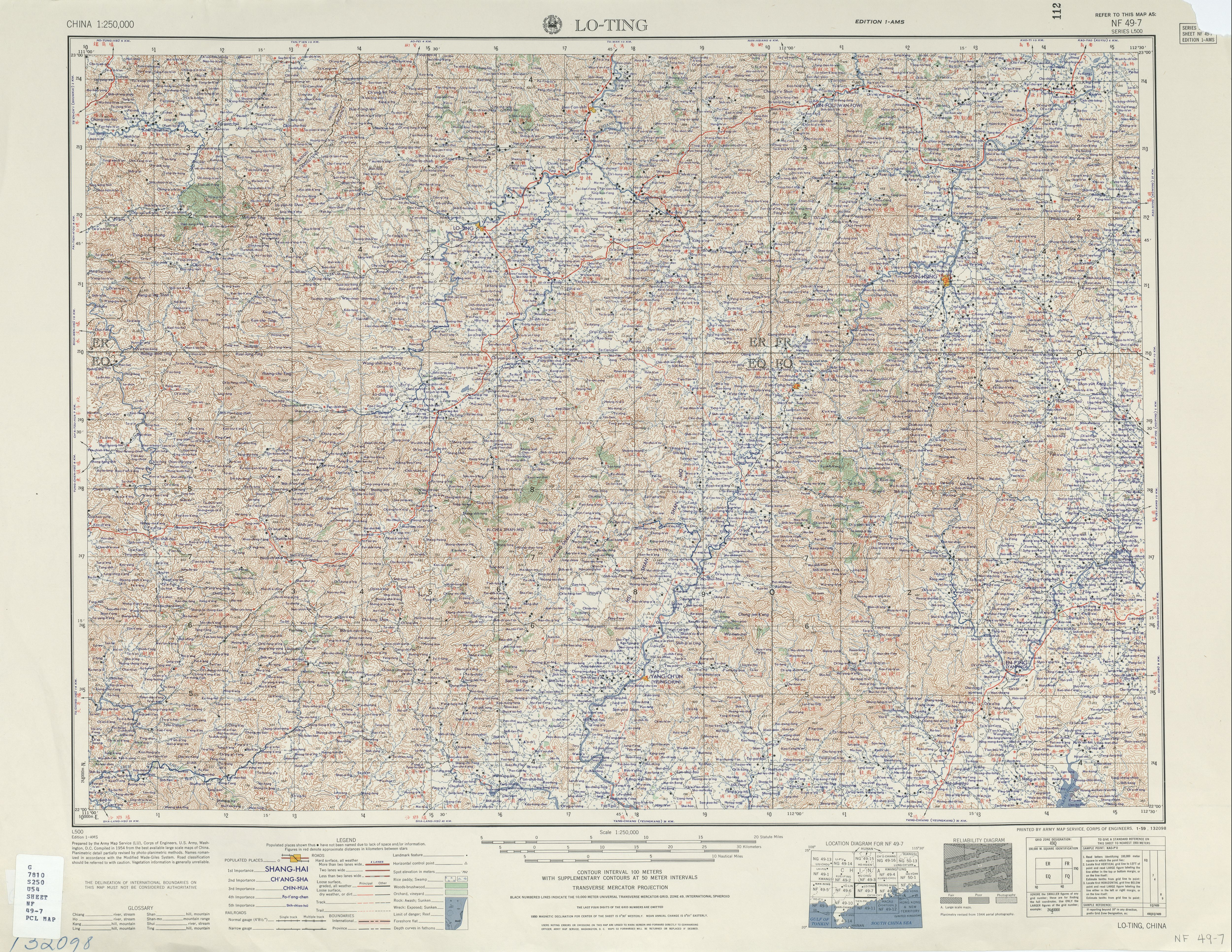
Map including Luoding (labeled as LO-TING 罗定) (AMS, 1954)

At a width of 184 li (~92 km) and length of 200 li (~100 km), Luoding borders Guangxi to the northwest.

== Notable people ==
- Cai Tingkai (蔡廷鍇), born in 1892, died in 1968, was a Chinese general.
- Cheung Ka Nien (張嘉年), Hong Kong actor, mr cheung is the main cast of the film: Suk Suk (Twilight's Kiss)
- Tang Chun Kit (鄧俊傑), Hong Kong male historian, his research interest is the philosophy of scholar Zhan Ruo Shui (湛若水).

== Climate ==
Climate data for Luoding, elevation 60 m (200 ft), (1991–2020 normals, extremes 1981–present)
Month	Jan	Feb	Mar	Apr	May	Jun	Jul	Aug	Sep	Oct	Nov	Dec	Year
Record high °C (°F)	29.8 (85.6)	33.4 (92.1)	33.6 (92.5)	37.0 (98.6)	37.2 (99.0)	38.2 (100.8)	39.3 (102.7)	39.0 (102.2)	38.2 (100.8)	36.6 (97.9)	34.0 (93.2)	30.3 (86.5)	39.3 (102.7)
Mean daily maximum °C (°F)	18.0 (64.4)	19.6 (67.3)	21.9 (71.4)	26.4 (79.5)	30.3 (86.5)	32.3 (90.1)	33.3 (91.9)	33.3 (91.9)	31.9 (89.4)	29.0 (84.2)	24.9 (76.8)	20.1 (68.2)	26.8 (80.1)
Daily mean °C (°F)	14.1 (57.4)	15.7 (60.3)	18.4 (65.1)	22.7 (72.9)	26.2 (79.2)	28.1 (82.6)	28.9 (84.0)	28.9 (84.0)	27.8 (82.0)	24.9 (76.8)	20.5 (68.9)	15.8 (60.4)	22.7 (72.8)
Mean daily minimum °C (°F)	11.3 (52.3)	13.0 (55.4)	15.9 (60.6)	20.1 (68.2)	23.4 (74.1)	25.3 (77.5)	25.9 (78.6)	25.9 (78.6)	24.8 (76.6)	21.6 (70.9)	17.2 (63.0)	12.6 (54.7)	19.8 (67.5)
Record low °C (°F)	0.8 (33.4)	2.6 (36.7)	3.1 (37.6)	9.3 (48.7)	13.8 (56.8)	18.0 (64.4)	21.0 (69.8)	21.5 (70.7)	15.9 (60.6)	9.3 (48.7)	4.0 (39.2)	−0.2 (31.6)	−0.2 (31.6)
Average precipitation mm (inches)	49.1 (1.93)	47.5 (1.87)	91.9 (3.62)	176.7 (6.96)	252.6 (9.94)	280.4 (11.04)	231.5 (9.11)	208.4 (8.20)	151.8 (5.98)	60.7 (2.39)	42.2 (1.66)	36.0 (1.42)	1,628.8 (64.12)
Average precipitation days (≥ 0.1 mm)	8.7	9.5	13.3	13.6	17.2	18.5	16.8	16.5	12.1	6.1	6.3	6.2	144.8
Average relative humidity (%)	73	77	81	82	81	82	80	79	76	69	69	68	76
Mean monthly sunshine hours	91.5	81.9	70.4	92.4	137.8	150.0	187.5	173.8	160.6	170.8	144.6	126.9	1,588.2
Percentage possible sunshine	27	25	19	24	34	37	45	44	44	48	44	38	36
Source: China Meteorological Administrationall-time October record

== See also ==
- 2009 Luoding flood
