= Erlang, Guizhou =

Erlang 二郎镇
- Town
- Location in Guizhou
- Coordinates: 28°9′52″N 106°21′7″E
- Country: People's Republic of China
- Province: Guizhou
- Prefecture-level City: Zunyi
- County: Xishui County
- Time zone: UTC+8 (China Standard)

Erlang (Chinese: 二郎; pinyin: Èrláng) is a town under the administration of Xishui County, Guizhou, China. As of 2023, it administers one residential community and the following eight villages:

- Erlang Village
- Fenshui Village (分水村)
- Daqiao Village (大桥村)
- Shuitian Village (水田村)
- Qingfeng Village (庆丰村)
- Moluo Village (莫洛村)
- Shaba Village (沙坝村)
- Qingfeng Village (青峰村)

== See also ==
- List of township-level divisions of Guizhou
