= Taiwan Number One =

Anti-Chinese social media slogan

Taiwan Number One ("TAIWAN #1", Chinese: 台灣No.1) is a slogan coined in 2015 by American gamer Angrypug that angered Chinese players of a battle royale game H1Z1. It has since become a buzzword in online culture about cross-strait relations.

== Origin ==
H1Z1 was released on Steam's early access program on January 15, 2015. However, the game company did not provide dedicated servers for players from Asian countries such as China, Japan, South Korea, and Taiwan, causing a large number of players from these countries to join the servers in the United States, Europe, and Australia. This led to enmity between mainland China and Taiwan players being observed by Western gamers on the same server.

On October 18, 2015, American video game streamer Angrypug deliberately played the National Anthem of the Republic of China and displayed the Flag of the Republic of China while shouting "Taiwan Number One" during an H1Z1 game on a Twitch broadcast, prompting mainland Chinese gamers to shout "Fuck" and "Fuck your mom" in both English and Chinese language.

In the summer of 2017, the game was officially banned from being streamed on all major platforms under the jurisdiction of mainland China.

== Subsequent uses ==
On January 26, 2016, American streamer curvyllama played H1Z1 on a Twitch broadcast; after she had killed an opponent, the opponent cursed "Fuck your mom" in Mandarin Chinese and curvyllama, realizing that the opponent was a mainland Chinese player, fired back with "Taiwan Number One".

In August 2017, Taiwan won 26 gold, 34 silver and 30 bronze medals at the 2017 Summer Universiade. Taiwan's President Tsai Ing-wen shouted "台灣No.1！" (i.e. "Taiwan No. 1!") to praise the performances of national players such as badminton queen Tai Tzu-ying, who was ranked No. 1 in the world at the time.

== See also ==
- Anti–People's Republic of China sentiment
- Taiwanese nationalism
