= One-dog policy =

Chinese policy

The one-dog policy (Chinese: 一犬一户; pinyin: Yī quǎn yī hù) is a policy implemented in the People's Republic of China in 2006, restricting residents of Beijing City to one dog per family. It also prohibits Beijing residents from raising large (over 35 cm (14 in) tall) and ferocious dogs. Effective from May 2011 onwards, a similar policy was implemented in Shanghai: each household is only allowed to register one dog, but unlike in Beijing, in Shanghai there is no size restriction for the dog owned. For instance, in Xujiahui, Shanghai, the local café Husky Go! allows clients to interact with Siberian Huskies, a dog breed that surpasses 35 cm (14 in) in height. Nonetheless, certain dog breeds perceived as potentially dangerous by the Chinese authorities are forbidden in Shanghai, including the Bulldog, Bull Terrier, and Mastiff.

== Causes ==
The one-dog policy was implemented in 2006, when it became apparent that rabies was the infectious disease killing the most people in that year. Xinhua News Agency, the official news agency of the Chinese government, said that rabies had killed 318 people in September 2006 and 2,651 people in 2004, the latest year for which data is available. Only 3% of dogs in China are vaccinated, while 69,000 people sought treatment for rabies in 2005 in Beijing alone.

== Regulation ==
The policy restricts every family to one dog as a maximum both in Beijing and Shanghai. It also sets a legal limit for dog height at 35 cm (14 inches) in Beijing, but not in Shanghai. Dogs are not allowed to be abandoned, and owners cannot take their dogs to public places such as markets, parks and sightseeing areas.

== Effects ==
The policy has caused small protests (such as one outside the Beijing Zoo which was composed of 200 protesters). The fines for keeping more than one dog or an oversized dog are about US$650.

The policy has also prompted mixed reactions from animal rights groups, with the Humane Society of the United States criticizing the policy and PETA supporting it.

== See also ==
- 2009 Shaanxi dog-free zone
- One-child policy
