= Huilong, Zunyi =

Huilong 回龙镇
- Town
- Interactive map of Huilong
- Coordinates: 28°11′20″N 106°12′31″E
- Country: People's Republic of China
- Province: Guizhou
- Prefecture-level city: Zunyi
- County: Xishui
- Village-level divisions: 1 residential community 12 villages
- Elevation: 1,067 m (3,501 ft)
- Time zone: UTC+8 (China Standard)
- Area code: 0852

Huilong (simplified Chinese: 回龙; traditional Chinese: 回龍; pinyin: Huílóng) is a town of Xishui County in northern Guizhou province, China, situated 33 kilometres (21 mi) northeast of the county seat. As of 2011, it has one residential community (居委会) and nine villages under its administration.

== See also ==
- List of township-level divisions of Guizhou
