= Taiwanese nationalism =

Taiwanese political ideology

Flag of the World Taiwanese Congress. It is mainly used by Taiwan independence supporters.

Taiwanese nationalism (Chinese: 臺灣民族主義; pinyin: Táiwān Mínzú Zhǔyì; Pe̍h-ōe-jī: Tâi-oân bîn-cho̍k-chú-gī) (Note: Taiwanese nationalism is sometimes called 台灣國民主義 (pinyin: Táiwān Guómín Zhǔyì; Pe̍h-ōe-jī: Tâi-ôan kok-bîn chú-gī), but it is more in the context of Taiwanese identity-based "civic nationalism", which excludes Hoklo ethno-nationalism.) is a nationalist political movement that promotes the cultural identity and unity of the Taiwanese people as a nation. This movement is generally associated with liberal ethnic nationalism, ethnocultural nationalism, or multi-ethnic nationalism, and it was the main motivation behind Taiwan’s democratization.

In recent decades, it consists of cultural or political movements that seek to resolve the current political and social division on the issues of Taiwan's national identity, political status, and political dispute with China. It is closely linked to the Taiwan independence movement but distinguished from it in that the independence movement seeks to eventually establish an independent "Republic of Taiwan" in place of or out of the existing Republic of China and obtain United Nations and international recognition as a sovereign state, while nationalists seek only to establish or reinforce an independent Taiwanese identity that distinguishes Taiwanese people apart from the Chinese nation, without necessarily advocating changing the official name of the country.

== Types ==
National flag of the Republic of China (Taiwan). It is mainly used by Huadu nationalists, however it is also used by Chinese nationalists (such as proponents of Republic of China nationalism).

Taiwanese nationalist camp is largely divided into ROC independence (abbreviated Huadu) and Taiwan independence (abbreviated Taidu). While supporters of Taiwan independence seek to establish a "Republic of Taiwan" rather than the Republic of China, but ROC independence supporters support two Chinas that strengthen their Taiwanese identity while distinguishing the "Republic of China" from the People's Republic of China.

Historically, "Taiwanese nationalism" was not necessarily antagonistic to Chinese nationalism. Under Japanese rule, Taiwanese nationalists sought to separate Taiwan from Japan and establish a unique Taiwanese identity. Among these was the Taiwanese People's Party, which adopted the Three Principles of the People as its ideology. It utilised Taiwanese nationalism as part of a broader Chinese nationalism.

== History ==
Taiwanese nationalism as a movement is relatively young compared to the history of the island itself. Now a majority ethnic Han Chinese population, Taiwan used to be populated by Austronesian peoples. Throughout the Ming and Qing dynasties Taiwan would grow in its Han population. During the late Qing and Japanese occupation Taiwanese nationalism grew as a concept with demands for self governance. Post World War II under the Republic of China government the movement has flourished into what it is today. Today, this movement supports the self-determination of the ethnically Taiwanese, (Note: In this context, "ethnically Taiwanese" as used here generally refers to "four ethnicity" (四族群): Hoklo people, Hakka people, Taiwanese indigenous peoples, and Waishengren.) including major groups such as the Democratic Progressive Party.

=== Early history ===
The island of Taiwan was largely populated by a variety of Austronesian tribes for most of its human history. It is believed that the island was settled around 6000 years ago due to archeological findings. During the 17th century things began to change as large groups of Han Chinese from the mainland began migrating to the island. Both the Dutch and Spanish had set up small colonies on Taiwan during this time. For a brief time the island was held by a group of Ming loyalists after kicking out the European settlers. In 1683 the Qing Empire annexed Taiwan and established it as a frontier region. Throughout Qing rule Han migration to Taiwan would slowly increase leading to both conflict and integration of local peoples.

=== Japanese colonial rule ===
After the First Sino-Japanese War in 1895, China would cede Taiwan to Japan. Under Japanese leadership the island would industrialize and modernise. Taiwan would see a growth of a distinct identity through education, language policies, and cultural transformation at the time. Under colonial rule the petition for self governance was made by the Taiwanese as the nationalist and anti-Japan sentiment grew. This period of colonialism separates Taiwan from the rest of China, unique history like this is often a talking point among Taiwanese nationalists.

=== Post-WW2 and KMT rule ===
After the devastation of World War II and the following Chinese Civil War Taiwan was under KMT authoritarian control. “White Terror” was the name given to brutal KMT repression of anyone deemed a political dissident. From the 1940s until the 1980s the KMT government within Taiwan violently consolidated power through repression and imprisonment of anyone deemed to be against the “one true Chinese state”. This period of time saw local cultures diminished in favor of the state's Chinese nationalism. Forced sinicization is what was imposed widespread across Taiwan, forcing citizens to learn Mandarin and have Chinese identities.

=== Democratization ===
In 1987 martial law was lifted in Taiwan and the world saw as the KMT government shifted towards democracy. The shift towards democracy and away from oppression within Taiwan saw the reemergence of local cultures and a Taiwanese identity. Without restricted speech and media new ideas surrounding the identity of Taiwan spread across the small island.

=== Modern day ===
In modern day Taiwan the narrative is rapidly shifting away from the one put out under the KMT dictatorship. Increasing numbers of young people born in Taiwan see themselves as primarily Taiwanese, opposed to both Chinese and Taiwanese or primarily Chinese. This shift can be attributed to a number of changes made within Taiwan in recent history. The shift to locally controlled education means more emphasis is put on the history of Taiwan rather than China as a whole. The striking differences between the PRC and ROC governments lead to many in Taiwan seeing themselves as different from the mainland. And the separately developing cultures between Taiwan and mainland China have led to different identities through things as simple as music and television. An emphasis on democratic values and personal identities has shifted the viewpoint of many within Taiwan to see themselves as a different group of people than the Han Chinese living within the PRC.

== Taiwanization ==
Taiwanization is a conceptual term used in Taiwan to emphasize the importance of a Taiwanese culture, society, economy, nationality, and identity rather than to regard Taiwan as solely an appendage of China. In the domestic dispute over the role of Taiwanization, Chinese nationalists in Taiwan argue that Taiwanese culture should only be emphasized in the larger context of Chinese culture, while Taiwanese nationalists argue that Chinese culture is only one part of Taiwanese culture. Supporters of Taiwanization often view it as a way to better reflect the island’s diverse historical experiences and culture. Critics worry that emphasizing a separate Taiwanese identity may deepen division between the mainland Chinese population and Taiwan. As the divide between the People's Republic of China and the Republic of China continues so will Taiwanization as a force against reunification.

== Taiwanese nationalist political parties ==
- Taiwanese People's Party (1927–1931)
- Taiwanese Communist Party (1928–1931)
- Democratic Progressive Party (1986–present)
- Taiwan Independence Party (1996–2020)
- Taiwan Solidarity Union (2001–present)
- New Power Party (2015–present)
- Free Taiwan Party (2015–present)
- Taiwan Statebuilding Party (2016–present)

== See also ==
- 1025 rally to safeguard Taiwan / 517 Protest
- Cultural nationalism
- Desinicization
- February 28 Incident
- Formosa Alliance
- Han Taiwanese nationalism
- History of Taiwan
- Hong Kong nationalism
- Liberalism and nationalism
- New Taiwanese
- Pro–Republic of China sentiment
- Pro-Taiwanese sentiment
- Qiandao Lake Incident
- Second Republic of China (Taiwan)
- Seediq Bale
- Sinicization
- Sinocentrism
- Taiwan nativist literature
- Taiwan Number One
- Taiwan independence Left
- Taiwanese literature movement
- Taiwanese Localism Front
- Taiwanese nationalism in Taiwan under Japanese rule
- Third Taiwan Strait Crisis
