= Luoding Wenta Pagoda =

Pagoda in Luoding, Guangdong, China

Coordinates: 22°46′25″N 111°33′48″E

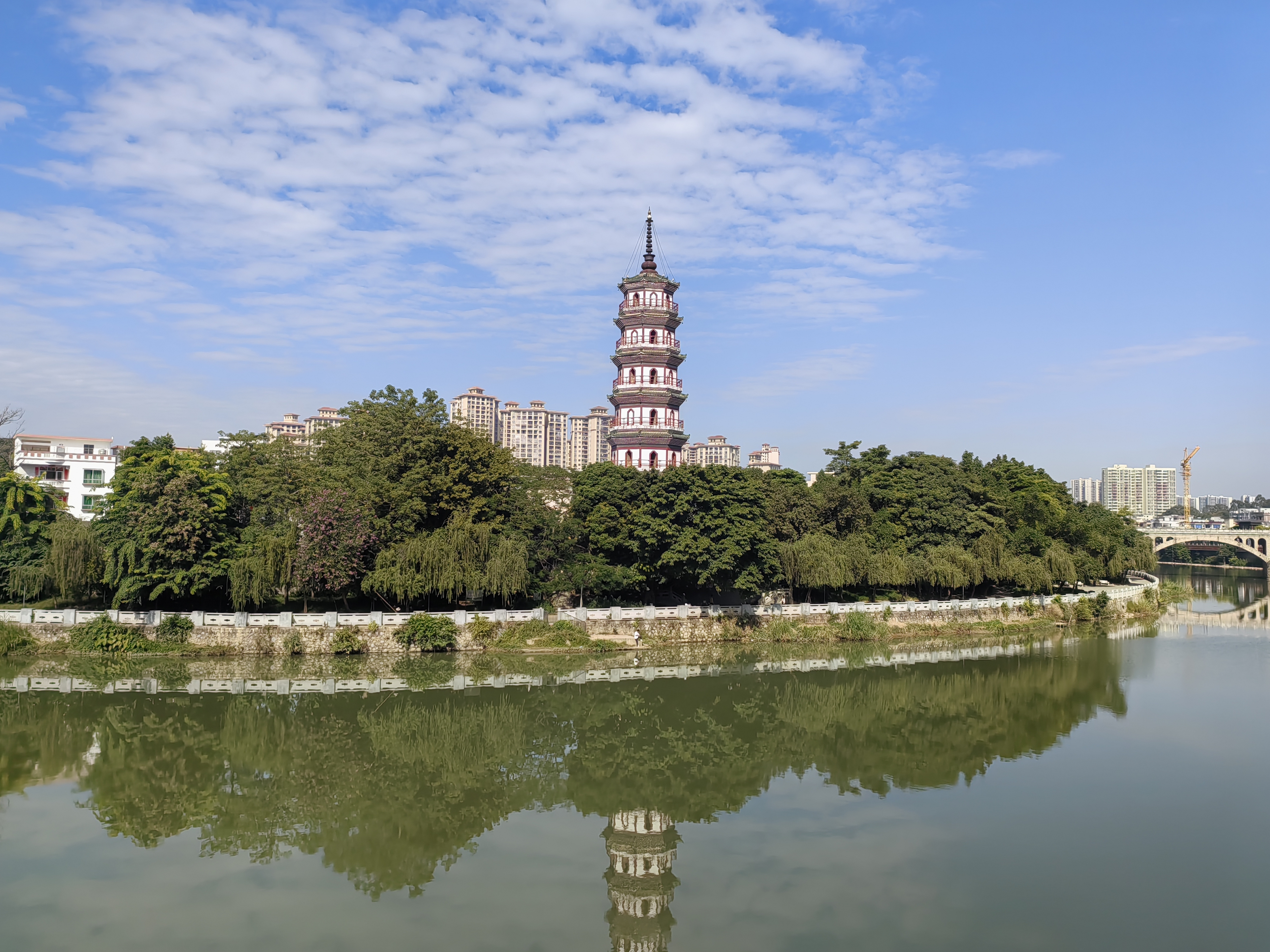

The Luoding Wenta Padoga (Chinese: 罗定文塔), also known as the Sanyuan Pagoda, is situated in Luoding, Guangdong province, China. One of Luoding's historic landmarks, the Wenta Pagoda sits on a peninsula hugged by the Longjiang River (泷江).

== History ==
Built in 1611, the 39th year of the Wanli reign during the Ming Dynasty, serves as a prominent culture landmark for Luoding's constituents.

On June 29, 1989, it was designated as a Provincial Cultural Relic Protection Unit in the province of Guangdong.

Today, accompanied by several parks and historical sites nearby, the pagoda welcomes a number of visitors each year from students and enthusiasts alike.

== Architecture ==
Standing at 47 meters, the pagoda has seven exterior levels and thirteen internal levels build in an octagonal-shaped traditional pavilion style. Inside are wooden floors, flat seats, a veranda-style corridor, and pillars on the top floor coated with ornamental iron casings. Its iron finials, both internal and external, are listed at more than seven tons.

Observers viewing the pagoda from the outside can find that the eaves of the tower are paved with green, glazed tiles equipped with 64 copper bells hung at its corners.
