= Zeng Fanyi =

Chinese geneticist

Zeng Fanyi (Chinese: 曾凡一; pinyin: Zéng Fányī; born January 1968) is a Chinese stem cell scientist and professor at Shanghai Jiao Tong University (SJTU) medical school.

== Biography ==
Zeng was born in Shanghai in 1968 with ancestral roots in Shunde, Guangdong province.

Zeng's father Zeng Yitao is a geneticist and academician of the Chinese Academy of Engineering. Both Zengs were students of Tan Jiazhen, who was a founder of modern genetics in China.

Zeng Fanyi obtained her Bachelor of Science from the University of California, San Diego (UCSD), and M.D. and Ph.D. from the University of Pennsylvania (UPenn) Medical School and the University of Pennsylvania School of Arts and Sciences, respectively. Zeng also carried-out postdoctoral research at the University of Pennsylvania.

Zeng joined the Shanghai Jiao Tong University School of Medicine (Basic Medicine Division) in Oct 2007. Currently, she is the vice-president of the Shanghai Institute of Medical Genetics at SJTU, where her father Zeng Yitao is director-general. Zeng Fanyi is also the Vice-president of the Shanghai Stem Cell Institute.

== Research ==
Zeng's research is mainly focused on medical genetics and developmental biology.

In July 2009 Zeng, her co-workers, and her co-operational team published a paper in Nature, demonstrating for the first-time that an entire mammalian body can be generated from induced pluripotent stem cells (iPSCs). They used mouse embryos and created iPSCs by applying the same method as Shinya Yamanaka's team. They further created tetraploid embryos by fusing two early-stage fertilized embryos. They implanted these embryos and some of them finally developed into full mice. Twelve mice even mated and produced offspring, which showed no physical deficiencies.

== See also ==
- Timeline of women in science
