= Tang Fu-zhen self-immolation incident =

2009 protest event in China

The Tang Fu-zhen self-immolation incident (Chinese: 唐福珍自焚事件) was an event that occurred at Chengdu, Sichuan, People's Republic of China on November 13, 2009. Tang Fu-zhen (唐福珍) fought with a demolition crew and government authorities in an effort to save a building. In the end she lost and immolated herself. The incident has triggered a debate on "forced demolitions" rampant across China.

== Background ==
In 1996, Tang Fu-zhen's husband Hu Chang-ming (胡昌明) constructed a three-story building in Jinhua village (金华村).

== Event ==
At the time of the incident Tang Fu-zhen was 47 years of age. On November 13, 2009, Tang Fu-zhen together with her relatives and those of her ex-husband's relatives fought with a demolition team. According to her brother Tang Fu-ming (唐福明), he told the media the demolition relocation took place at the early morning hour of 5 AM on November 13. People wearing camouflage clothing started entering the building armed with shields and steel pipes. The attackers started indiscriminately beating anyone in the building. The demolition crew were backed by police and firefighters. Tang and her relatives threw rocks and bottles filled with gasoline.

Three hours into the melee, Tang poured gasoline all over her body. She began saying something on the roof of the building, while others tried to prevent her actions. In 10 minutes, she immolated herself and turned bright red in flames on the roof. In the event, four members of Tang Fu-zhen's family ended up wounded and in the hospital. Two people suffered severe injuries. Seven people were taken away by public safety officials.

Tang Fu-zhen's sister Tang Fu-jing (唐福英) said that after the immolation incident, her hospital room was blockaded by 4 people. She was not able to see her sister at all. On November 29, 2009 at 11 PM Tang Fu-zhen was officially pronounced dead by the hospital. The building was also destroyed.

A mobile phone captured the event and spread the video on the Internet. The story was given wide coverage and was broadcast on CCTV.

== Demolition law ==
In 2001, mainland China's regulation authorizes demolition "before" a compensation agreement is reached. However, in 2007 a property law said demolition work can start only "after" both the demolition crew and residents agree on compensation. This contradiction in the law has led to widespread dissatisfaction among people who lose their homes without fair compensation.

== Other construction incidents ==
In November 2009, a Shanghai woman threw gasoline bombs at government forklifts working on an expansion of the Hongqiao airport expansion. In Chengdu, a woman set fire to herself in front of police and firefighters.

=== Forced demolition in Gumo village, Weihai ===
Feng-luwei, the head of Gumo village in Weihai, Shangdong (威海市古陌村委书记冯鲁威) pulled down the widow Wang-guiying's (王桂英) house by violence in 2000. The land use right was forced to be changed, even though house owner still has the land deed and house ownership certificate. The widows have not been relocated after 13 years. Wang-guiying has been appealing to the higher authorities for help to Beijing for 10 years more. Yet every time, she was obstructed by Feng-luwei (冯鲁威), who sent his men to shadow Wang-guiying 24 hours a day, especially during the people's congress.

=== Other incidents ===
In Guiyang, 13 residents were kidnapped by thugs hired by a local real estate developer who then demolished their homes.

On December 14, 2009, a man named Xi Xinzhu (席新柱) in Beijing also immolated himself when government officials pressed his family to give up their home. He suffered 10% body burns.
