= New Star incident =

2009 sinking of a Chinese ship in Russia

The New Star incident was an event that occurred near the eastern port city of Vladivostok, when a Russian warship fired on a Chinese cargo vessel called the New Star. The cargo ship was sunk on February 15, 2009, with Russia and China presenting different stories regarding the incident.

== New Star ==
The New Star (新星 Xīnxīng) was a 5000-ton ship leased by a company based in Hong Kong. There were 16 crew members, 6 Indonesian and 10 Chinese citizens. The vessel was owned by Tongyu Shipping Zhejiang (浙江通宇船務有限公司) and leased to the Hong Kong–based J-Rui Lucky shipping company (香港吉瑞祥（香港）有限公司 Xiānggǎng jí ruìxiáng (Xiānggǎng) yǒuxiàn gōngsī).

The RIA Novosti said crew members attempted to escape in two life-rafts after their ship was sinking. Only half of them were rescued by a Russian vessel. According to Xinhua News Agency, seven sailors were still missing and only three were rescued.

== See also ==
- United Nations Flight 544 shootdown

== Additional sources ==
- http://www.bloomberg.com/apps/news?pid=20601080&sid=acUuNBiKjveM&refer=asia
- http://www.lloydslist.com/ll/news/new-star-pursued-by-russian-coast-guard-before-sinking/20017619947.htm
- http://www.nytimes.com/2009/02/21/world/asia/21china.html?ref=world
- In Chinese:武汉综合新闻网:新星号货轮沉船事件3名获救中国船员启程回国 Google translation
- In Chinese:山西新闻网 山西晚报:沉船事件仍然扑朔迷离（图） Google translation
- In Chinese:世界经理人 :俄罗斯远东军事检察院分院对沉船事件刑事立案 Google translation
- In Chinese:舜网-济南时报:山东律师任沉船事件法律顾问Google translation
- In Chinese:青年時報:新星号船东再发声明抗议俄方不公开调查沉船事件Google translation
- In Chinese:德國之聲中文網:“新星号事件”俄中各有说法 Google translation
- InChinese:解放日報:失踪的7名中国船员中5具遗体被发现中方不能接受俄就沉船表态 为何只救出一艘小艇
- In Chinese:东方早报 选稿:黄骏:新星号船主:俄编弥天大谎欲掩盖真相推责任 Google translation
- In Chinese:“新星”号沉没“罗生门” 编辑：航运信息网 Google translation
