= 2009 Shaanxi dog-free zone =

Chinese dog ownership

The 2009 Shaanxi dog-free zone is a goal by the government of Shaanxi Province in north central People's Republic of China (PRC) to begin killing large number of dogs as part of a campaign to stop the spread of rabies in the region via stray dogs attacking humans.

== History ==
In 2006 a similar destruction of 50,000 dogs in Mouding county, Yunnan Province in south central China occurred after three deaths from rabies. This was followed a couple of weeks later by another widespread culling in Jining, Shandong province in western China after 16 people died from rabies. China uses both the compulsory vaccination and registration of pets and the killing of strays as instruments in rabies control. Dogs, except in cages for sale as meat, are not allowed in a number of urban areas and strays are killed. World Health Organization reports attribute some part of a rise in rabies in China in the 1980s to the reform and opening up which saw an increase in dog populations in rural areas, and later in the 1990s to an increase in the demand for dog meat and to problems with rabies vaccine quality. The 1980s increase was dealt with primarily with a large-scale vaccination campaign in rural areas where dog rabies is endemic, but some dog slaughters also took place. Outbreaks in Beijing in the early to mid-1990s were also dealt with by ordering strike teams to capture and kill dogs, including pets, making this 2006 governmental killing of dogs a single incident among a number of similar mass killings. The World Health Organization also recommends a ban on bringing dog meat from rural to urban areas.

== Goal ==
In 2009 Yang County is striving to be the first county nationally in the PRC to have no dogs. The government ordered all dogs within a radius range of 3206 square kilometres to be killed, including registered and vaccinated dogs. In a statement to China Daily, Dang Zhengqing stated this was the only way they could stop the spread of rabies.

== Preventive measures ==
People who are already pet owners were advised to register their dogs and vaccinate them. These vaccinations were offered for free. Stray and wild dogs within the region were also put down by the government. It was reported that over 20,000 dogs had been killed in the city of Hanzhong alone. Free leashes were also provided to allow citizens to control their dogs.

== See also ==
- Animal rights
- One-dog policy
