= New Taiwanese =

New Taiwanese (Chinese: 新台灣人), also known as New Era Taiwanese, is a form of nationalism and political ideology in Taiwan. It was first proposed by the former President of the Republic of China, Lee Teng-hui, in 1998. It briefly became an official stance of the Kuomintang (KMT), and former President Ma Ying-jeou once used it as a central theme of his election campaign. Lee Teng-hui hoped to use democracy and Taiwanese identity to replace traditional nationalism, which was previously categorized by ethnic origin. He advocated that regardless of whether one belongs to the "benshengren" (local) or "waishengren" (mainland-born) ethnic groups, anyone who identifies with Taiwan can become a New Taiwanese, thereby establishing Taiwanese nationalism based on civic nationalism.

The People's Republic of China considers this a form of Taiwan independence thought.

== Overview ==
In a 1995 speech, Lee Teng-hui proposed that Taiwan needed to establish a new sense of "community of destiny" (Gemeinschaft) consciousness to deepen Taiwanese democracy. In 1998, Lee officially introduced this claim, hoping to use it to resolve Taiwan's long-standing national identity issues and form a collective Taiwanese consciousness. He stated that the concept represents the aspiration of all people who live, toil, and dedicate themselves to Taiwan, regardless of their time of arrival, mother tongues, or geographical origins.

=== 1998 Taipei mayoral election ===
The concept gained widespread political prominence during the 1998 Taipei mayoral election. At a campaign rally, Lee Teng-hui famously raised the hand of the KMT candidate Ma Ying-jeou—who is of waishengren (mainlander) descent—and publicly asked him where he was from and whether he would sell out Taiwan. Ma responded in Taiwanese Hokkien that he grew up drinking Taiwan's water and eating Taiwan's rice, and declared himself a "New Taiwanese."

This endorsement and the "New Taiwanese" framing helped Ma shed the KMT's traditional mainlander-centric image, allowing him to successfully defeat the incumbent mayor, Chen Shui-bian of the Democratic Progressive Party (DPP), and regain control of the Taipei city government for the KMT. In the 2002 election, Ma Ying-jeou continued to use this slogan.

== Concept and ideology ==
In his book New: The Stance of Taiwan, Lee Teng-hui argued that the New Taiwanese represents a form of civic nationalism. This differs from the "Old Taiwanese" defined by ethnicity, historical grievances, and bloodline. Instead, "New Taiwanese" is a nation formed under a common Taiwanese consciousness based on identification with Taiwan and its democratic institutions.

Politically, the introduction of the "New Taiwanese" identity served as a mechanism to defuse ethnic tensions between the benshengren and waishengren populations, while consolidating Taiwan's democratization process. This claim was also used to establish the concept that Taiwan and China belong to different countries, and that Taiwan is not a subordinate state of China.

== Later developments ==
Although the concept initially bridged the gap between Lee Teng-hui and Ma Ying-jeou, their political relationship later deteriorated. As Ma's political career progressed and he eventually became President, Lee became highly critical of Ma's cross-strait policies. Lee accused him of deviating from the "Lee Teng-hui route" and abandoning the core democratic and pro-Taiwan tenets of the "New Taiwanese" identity in favor of closer ties with Beijing.
