= Fang Jing =

- 方静
- Born: June 1971; Beijing, China
- Died: November 18, 2015 (aged 44); Taiwan
- Education: Harvard University
- Occupation: anchorwoman
- Years active: 1994 - 2009
- Known for: Oriental Horizon
- Television: China Central Television

Chinese name
- Traditional Chinese: 方靜
- Simplified Chinese: 方静
Transcriptions
Standard Mandarin
- Hanyu Pinyin: Fāng Jìng

Fang Jing (Chinese: 方静; June 1971 – 18 November 2015) was an anchorwoman of China Central Television (CCTV). She hosted several programs including the prime-time military program Defense Watch. In 2009 she came under suspicion of spying for Taiwan.

== Career ==
Fang Jing started working for CCTV in 1994 after graduating from China's top school for broadcasting and spent four months at Harvard University as a visiting scholar. She hosted a number of shows including the three-day live coverage of the transfer of sovereignty over Hong Kong and other millennium celebrations.

== Accusation of spying ==
In 2009, Fang was accused of disclosing state secrets to a man from Taiwan and receiving money from him. She denied the accusation, but no longer hosted CCTV's Defense Watch program after March 1, 2009.

== Death ==
Fang Jing received treatment for cancer in Taiwan, where she died on 18 November 2015, aged 44.
