= Collapse of Lotus Riverside Block 7 =

2009 building collapse in Shanghai, China

Coordinates: 31.1268°N 121.3978°E

The collapse of Block 7 at Lotus Riverside (simplified Chinese: 莲花河畔景苑; traditional Chinese: 蓮花河畔景苑; pinyin: lián huā hé pàn jǐng yuàn, a 13-story residential apartment building located in Minhang District, Shanghai, China) in 2009 is an accident in which one person died.

== Events ==
On June 27, 2009 at 5:30 Am UTC+8, Block 7, one of the eleven 13-story buildings of the apartment complex, toppled over sideways, killing one migrant worker named Xiao Dekun.

== Explanations ==
According to the Wall Street Journal, which referenced Shanghai Daily:

"According to Shanghai Daily, initial investigations attribute the accident to the excavations for the construction of a garage under the collapsed building. Large quantities of earth were removed and dumped in a landfill next to a nearby creek; the weight of the earth caused the river bank to collapse, which, in turn, allowed water to seep into the ground, creating a muddy foundation for the building that toppled."

== Litigation ==
The family of the migrant worker who died in the collapse, Xiao Dekun, received 775,000 RMB (approximately $113,000 USD) in compensation.

13 were tried over the collapse, 8 others including local regulators and subcontractors had their licenses terminated and were fined 500,000 RMB (approximately $68,000). 9 investors were fired from their local government jobs for conflicts of interest. The 2 top shareholders, Que Jingde and Zhang Zhiqin, were sentenced to life imprisonment after being convicted on charges of graft, embezzlement of corporate funds, and negligence leading to a serious accident. Zhang was also fined 5 million RMB (approximately 687,000 USD) and Que was fined 2 million RMB (approximately 275,000 USD).
