= Shanghai Stem Cell Institute =

Stem cell research institute in China

- Established: 2007; 19 years ago
- Focus: stem cell research
- Key people: Professor Zeng Fanyi
- Location: Shanghai, China

The Shanghai Stem Cell Institute is an institute in Shanghai, People's Republic of China dedicated to stem cell research.

== The institute ==
The institute, located within the Shanghai Jiao Tong University under the School of Medicine faculty, is entirely funded by the government of the People's Republic of China.

In 2007, the first Shanghai International Symposium on Stem Cell Research took place at Shanghai Jiatong University.

== IPS cell breakthrough ==
On July 24, 2009, the first publication of a successful breakthrough in Stem cell research was released, where Chinese researchers from the Shanghai Stem Cell Institute, led by Professor Fanyi Zeng, successfully reprogrammed adult stem cells to be able to differentiate into any body cell, as in the case with standard embryonic stem cells, the cells in question known as "induced pluripotent stem cells" (IPS cells). The IPS cells were obtained by genetically reprogramming the skin cells of mice to acts like embryonic stem cells, which then were able to differentiate into all forms of body tissue. The researchers have managed to use the IPS cells to create every type of cell in a mouse, creating entire mouse pups using the technique. This is the first time the technique has been used to make an entire mouse.

This breakthrough, published in the journals Nature and Cell Stem Cell and developed independently by two teams in China, may possibly depreciate the usage of stem cells obtained from human embryos. The oldest living mice created by the technique are nine months old and are reproducing, albeit showing signs of abnormalities. "This gives us hope for future therapeutic intervention using patients' own re-programmed cells in our far future," according to Professor Zeng Fanyi. A total of 27 mice were successfully born from the first generation of mice created from the IPS cells which were able to reproduce without any issues.

== See also ==
- Stem cell
