= 2009 Luoding flood =

Flood in Luoding, China

A major flood occurred in Luoding, Guangdong in the People's Republic of China in September 2009. The water level increased due to rain from Typhoon Koppu. The storm slammed into South China causing torrential rain, mudslides and an oil spill.

== Dam flood order ==
The town most seriously affected was Chuanbu (船步). Some sources pointed out that the township government was ordered by Guangdong provincial authorities to flood the countryside around Chuanbu to ease the water levels at the Shandong dam. More than 100 people stormed the government offices three times, they were not allowed in. A resident said township officials refused to meet with the villagers.

== Tolls and damages ==
Sources vary on the damages and tolls. Some sources listed the death toll at seven dead and six missing, while others listed three dead and four missing. More than 100,000 residents had to be evacuated and direct economic losses totaled two billion yuan.
