= Leon Yao Liang =

Chinese Roman Catholic bishop (1923–2009)

Leo Yao Liang (Chinese: 姚良;1923 – December 30, 2009) was the Catholic bishop of the Diocese of Ziwanzi, China.

Ordained in 1946, Yao Liang was sentenced to a Chinese Communist labor camp in 1958 and was released in 1984. With the approval of the Vatican, he was ordained bishop on February 19, 2002.
