= Xishui County, Guizhou =

Xishui County 习水县
- County
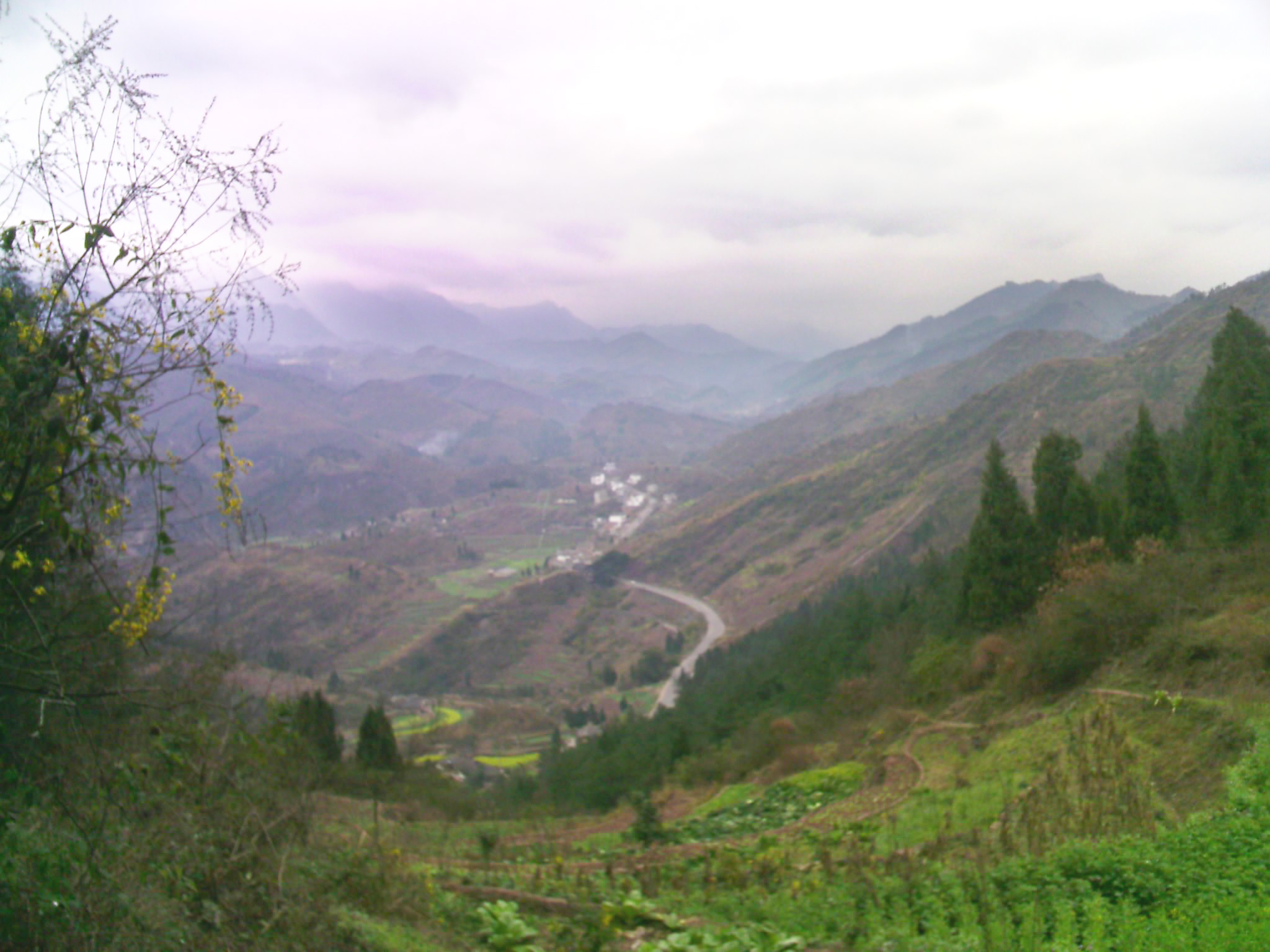

- Location of the seat in Guizhou Xishui (Southwest China)
- Coordinates (Xishui County government): 28°19′58″N 106°11′50″E
- Country: China
- Province: Guizhou
- Prefecture-level city: Zunyi
- County seat: Donghuang

Area
  - Total: 3,063.28 km^{2} (1,182.74 sq mi)

Population (2010)
  - Total: 522,541
  - Density: 170.582/km^{2} (441.806/sq mi)
- Time zone: UTC+8 (China Standard)

Xishui County (simplified Chinese: 习水县; traditional Chinese: 習水縣; pinyin: Xíshuǐ Xiàn) is a county in the north of Guizhou province, China, bordering Sichuan province to the southwest. It is under the administration of the prefecture-level city of Zunyi.

It was the site of the 2009 Xishui sex trial.

== Administrative divisions ==
Xishui County is divided into 4 subdistricts, 20 towns and 2 townships:

subdistricts

- Donghuang 东皇街道
- Jiulong 九龙街道
- Shanwang 杉王街道
- Malin 马临街道

towns

- Tucheng 土城镇
- Tongmin 同民镇
- Xingmin 醒民镇
- Longxing 隆兴镇
- Xijiu 习酒镇
- Huilong 回龙镇
- Sangmu 桑木镇
- Yong'an 永安镇
- Liangcun 良村镇
- Wenshui 温水镇
- Xianyuan 仙源镇
- Guandian 官店镇
- Zhaiba 寨坝镇
- Minhua 民化镇
- Erlang 二郎镇
- Erli 二里镇
- Sanchahe 三岔河镇
- Dapo 大坡镇
- Taolin 桃林镇
- Chengzhai 程寨镇

townships

- Shuanglong 双龙乡
- Niba 坭坝乡

== Education ==
Yang Dezhi Red Army School in Wenshui Town (温水镇) in Xishui County. It opened during the latter portion of the Qing Dynasty and became a Red Army School in 2008.

== Tourism ==
The county is home to the 11.5 kilometres (7.1 mi) "Xishui Forest Train" (an electric monorail with an engine shaped like a steam locomotive) (Chinese: 习水森林小火车) which allows for sightseeing through forests and lakes near the city of Xishui (Chinese: 习水县).

== Climate ==
Climate data for Xishui, elevation 1,180 m (3,870 ft), (1991–2020 normals, extremes 1971–present)
Month	Jan	Feb	Mar	Apr	May	Jun	Jul	Aug	Sep	Oct	Nov	Dec	Year
Record high °C (°F)	19.3 (66.7)	28.7 (83.7)	31.3 (88.3)	31.2 (88.2)	33.7 (92.7)	32.6 (90.7)	34.2 (93.6)	35.6 (96.1)	36.0 (96.8)	30.5 (86.9)	26.8 (80.2)	19.7 (67.5)	36.0 (96.8)
Mean daily maximum °C (°F)	5.7 (42.3)	8.7 (47.7)	13.4 (56.1)	18.8 (65.8)	22.2 (72.0)	24.4 (75.9)	27.7 (81.9)	27.6 (81.7)	23.5 (74.3)	17.4 (63.3)	13.2 (55.8)	7.6 (45.7)	17.5 (63.5)
Daily mean °C (°F)	3.1 (37.6)	5.3 (41.5)	9.4 (48.9)	14.3 (57.7)	17.7 (63.9)	20.4 (68.7)	23.2 (73.8)	22.7 (72.9)	19.2 (66.6)	14.2 (57.6)	9.7 (49.5)	4.6 (40.3)	13.6 (56.6)
Mean daily minimum °C (°F)	1.3 (34.3)	3.2 (37.8)	6.7 (44.1)	11.1 (52.0)	14.4 (57.9)	17.5 (63.5)	19.8 (67.6)	19.2 (66.6)	16.3 (61.3)	12.1 (53.8)	7.5 (45.5)	2.8 (37.0)	11.0 (51.8)
Record low °C (°F)	−6.4 (20.5)	−6.2 (20.8)	−5.6 (21.9)	0.0 (32.0)	5.5 (41.9)	10.1 (50.2)	10.9 (51.6)	11.2 (52.2)	7.2 (45.0)	0.7 (33.3)	−2.6 (27.3)	−8.6 (16.5)	−8.6 (16.5)
Average precipitation mm (inches)	26.3 (1.04)	26.5 (1.04)	52.9 (2.08)	89.8 (3.54)	134.0 (5.28)	204.1 (8.04)	170.0 (6.69)	131.1 (5.16)	94.7 (3.73)	88.8 (3.50)	40.3 (1.59)	26.0 (1.02)	1,084.5 (42.71)
Average precipitation days (≥ 0.1 mm)	18.7	16.1	17.5	17.3	17.7	18.2	14.4	14.0	13.8	18.8	15.4	16.8	198.7
Average snowy days	8.1	4.6	1	0	0	0	0	0	0	0	0.5	3.3	17.5
Average relative humidity (%)	87	85	83	81	80	84	79	79	82	86	86	87	83
Mean monthly sunshine hours	31.2	42.4	71.1	99.3	109.0	94.5	172.7	174.1	114.2	57.6	59.6	41.5	1,067.2
Percentage possible sunshine	10	13	19	26	26	23	41	43	31	16	19	13	23
Source 1: China Meteorological Administration
Source 2: Weather China

== Cuisine ==
Xishui county is a home of Chinese liquor (baijiu) xijiu.
