= Yunnan hide-and-seek incident =

Scandal involving alleged police murder in China

The Yunnan hide-and-seek incident (simplified Chinese: 云南躲猫猫事件; traditional Chinese: 雲南躲貓貓事件) also called the 208 case (208案件) was a case where a man was taken into police custody in Jinning, Yunnan, People's Republic of China in 2009 and mysteriously died a few days later. He was reported to have died from playing hide and seek, though netizens claim he was beaten to death by the police. The case was later closed with three suspects receiving different sentences.

== Incident ==
Li Qiaoming (李荞明), aged 24, of Yuxi city, was taken into custody in Jinning county on January 30, 2009 for cutting trees without authorization. He was hospitalized on February 8, and died four days later from severe brain injuries. According to Jinning police bureau, Li died while playing Peekaboo (躲猫猫), a game similar to hide-and-seek. They claimed an inmate reacted angrily when Li found his hiding spot during the game. Li was then pushed and struck a wall as he fell. The incident then appeared in local newspapers in Kunming on February 13.

== Investigation ==
Thousands of netizens responded and said Li died from police beatings. Rather than suppress the accusations, the province officials invited the public to help solve the case. Out of 1000 volunteers, a 15-person committee visited the crime scene. The committee members were given access to the crime scene but were not allowed to view surveillance tapes, examine the autopsy report, or question the guards. They were also not permitted to interview the prime suspect, Pǔ Huá-yǒng (普华永). After disclosing the identities of the volunteers, netizens later found out nearly all the “randomly selected” investigators were current or former employees of the state-run media. The outcome is uncertain.

== Court case ==
The case was closed with three other prison suspects receiving different sentences. Zhāng Hòuhuá (张厚华) received life imprisonment. Zhang Tāo (涛有) received 17 years of prison time and a fine of 1000 yuan. Pǔ Huáyǒng (普华永) received 16 years of prison time.

== See also ==
- List of prisons in Yunnan province
- Forced disappearance
