= ForeUI =

- Developer(s): EaSynth Solutions Inc. Ltd
- Initial release: April 27, 2009; 15 years ago
- Stable release: 5.00 SP1 / April 10, 2019; 5 years ago
- Written in: Java
- Operating system: Microsoft Windows, Mac OS, Linux, Solaris
- Available in: English, German, French, Spanish, Brazilian Portuguese, Russian, Polish
- Website: www.foreui.com

ForeUI is a UI prototyping tool, designed to create mockups, wireframes and prototypes for any application or website. With ForeUI, the prototype project will be skinnable, since the style of the prototype can be changed by switching the UI theme. The behavior of prototypes can be designed by defining flow charts to handle. The prototype can then be exported to wireframe images, PDF documents or HTML5 simulation. This makes ForeUI a tool for sharing ideas, reviewing design concepts, collecting feedback and usability testing.

ForeUI works on Windows, Mac OS X, Linux, and Solaris platforms.

ForeUI has been nominated for the Epsilon Award 2010. Later it won the third place of the award.
