= 2009 Xishui sex trial =

The 2009 Xishui sex trial (Chinese: 贵州习水嫖宿幼女案) is a court case in Xishui County, Guizhou, China involving the rape of under-aged girls by 7 people, 4 of which are government officials from the Chinese Communist Party. The officials were sentenced in a County court and aroused anger on the Chinese blogosphere and drew popular protests.

== Event ==
Between October 2007 to July 2008 a number of underaged teenage girls were raped in Xishui, Guizhou. An unemployed 37-year-old women named Yuan Li offered her own apartment as a hospitality venue for about 100 yuan or 30% of the income. The remaining profit went to a 14-year-old and 15-year-old who helped abduct schoolgirls from one primary school and three junior high schools. Comments from internet chat rooms said underaged girls were forced to have sex with government officials. The mother of an abused girl eventually reported the case to local police bureau on August 15, 2008. Police subsequently began investigating the case. An 8-member team went undercover in the county for 10 days. By the end of October, 7 people were arrested on charges of organizing and forcing 11 girls into prostitution. Three of the girls were under the age of 14.

== Trial ==
The close-door trial started at the People's Court of Xishui County on April 8, 2009. The following people were identified "customers" of the prostitution ring.

Name	Description
Li Shoumin	county migration official
Chen Mengran	land and resource official
Huang Yongliang	social security official
Chen Cun	legal affairs official
Mu Mingzhong	legislator
Feng Zhiyang	vocational school teacher
Feng Yong	taxi driver

The 16-hour trial ended without a verdict. There are two interpretations of the law. According to clause 236, having sex with a girl under the age of 14 should be treated as a rape and punished severely. According to clause 360, visiting a prostitute who is under the age of 14 should carry a jail sentence of five years or more. The rape offence can result in a death penalty while the second offence carries a maximum sentence of 15 years. The government officials received the lesser offense.

More than 1,000 people gathered outside the court and showed anger. The case has provoked nationwide anger at the shame of the officials and the way the trial was handled.

== See also ==
- 2008 Guizhou riot
