= 517 Protest =

2009 protest in Taiwan

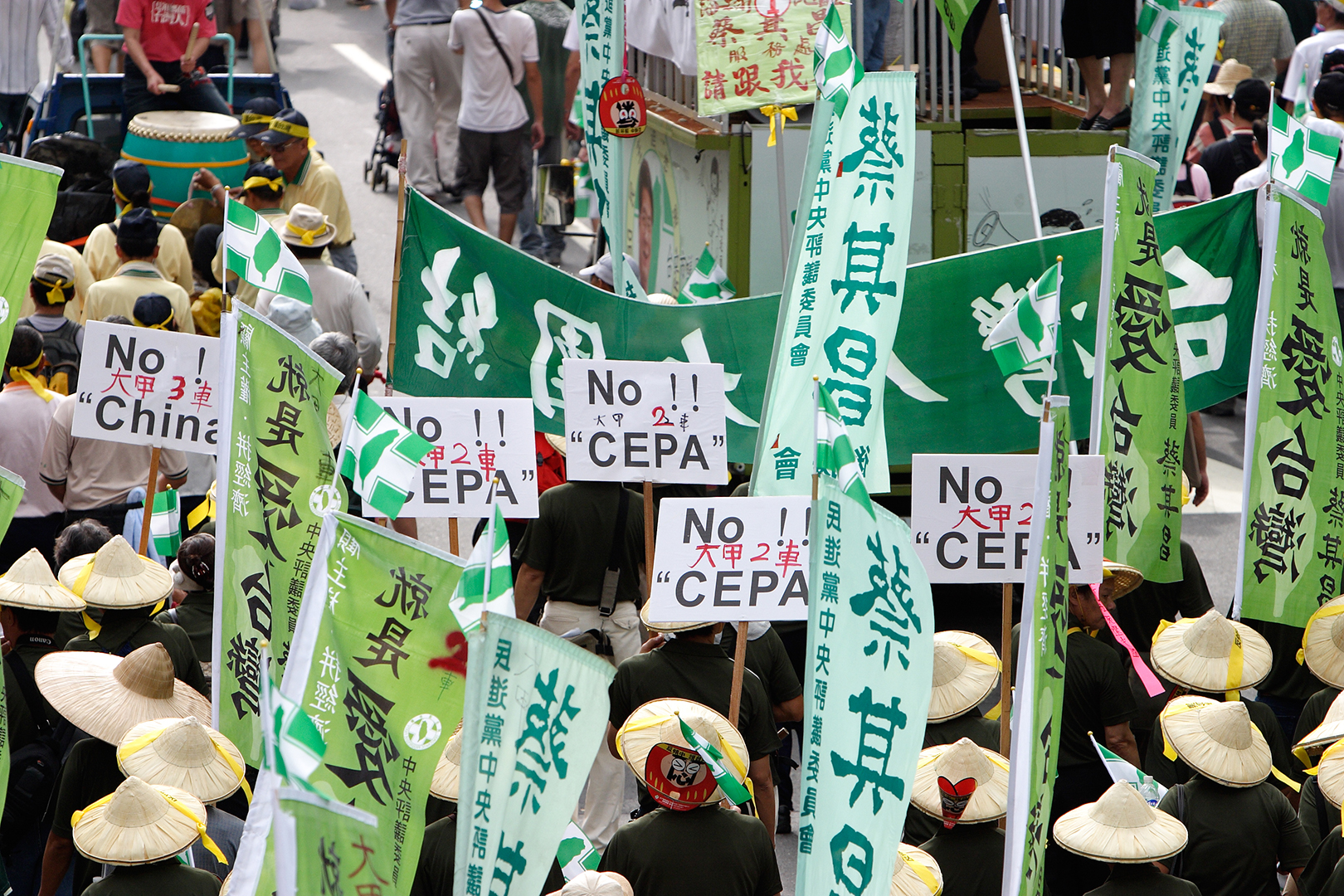
Pictures of the protest

The 517 Protest (Chinese: 517 嗆馬大遊行) was a protest that took place on 17 May 2009 in Taipei and Kaohsiung, Taiwan. The event vented anger at President Ma Ying-jeou for China-friendly policies that were seen as compromising Taiwan's sovereignty.

== Background ==
The protest was led by the Pan-Green Democratic Progressive Party (DPP). The demonstrators wanted a referendum on the "Economic cooperation framework agreement" (ECFA). Some have been made uneasy by the improvement of cross-strait relations with China given China's goal of unification with Taiwan. DPP also objects to the amendments that have been proposed to the Assembly and Parade Act, which the groups believes would restrict the right of people to assemble and put more power into the hands of authorities.

== Protest ==
In both protests, in Taipei and Kaohsiung, protesters assembled in four groups to march separately to a common, central point. The number of protesters involved varies by source, with organizers estimating 600,000 participants in Taipei and police less than 80,000. Organizers estimated 150,000 to 200,000 participants, possibly more, in Kaohsiung, while police placed the number at 30,000.

Two injuries were reported among men from Bade City, Taoyuan County who were struck by a police car, said to be driving very quickly, as they were crossing Hangchou South Road behind Chiang Kai-shek Memorial Hall. 67-year-old Hsu was only slightly injured, but 59-year-old Chang required surgery for his critical injuries.

The protest plan called for a 24-hour sit-in at the end of the marching in front of the Presidential Office to begin at 10:00 p.m. on Sunday. Although the sit-in was not registered, Taipei City Government declared that so long as traffic was not disrupted, it would be permitted.

== See also ==
- 1025 rally to safeguard Taiwan
- Chen Yunlin
- Dang Guo
- Wild Strawberry student movement
