= Xiangzhong Yang =

Xiangzhong "Jerry" Yang (simplified Chinese: 杨向中; traditional Chinese: 楊向中; pinyin: Yáng Xiàngzhōng; July 1959 – 5 February 2009) was a Chinese-American biotechnology scientist, and stem cell research advocate. In 1999 he was credited with creating the first cloned farm animal in the United States – a cow called "Amy".

Born on July 31, 1959, and raised in Wei County, Handan, Hebei, China, Yang attended Beijing Agricultural University (currently China Agricultural University). Upon graduation, he took the entrance exam for graduate study and ranked number one among all applicants in his field. He was therefore awarded a prestigious scholarship from the Ministry of Agriculture to study in the US. He emigrated to the United States in 1983 where he received his PhD under Robert Foote in 1991. Yang became a research faculty member at Cornell University and received multiple grants from the Cornell Biotechnology Center and Easter AI (Genex; http://genex.crinet.com/). In 1996 he joined the faculty at the University of Connecticut as an associate professor, and in 2001, was appointed founding director of the University's Center for Regenerative Biology.

In November 2017 Yang was honored with the naming of the street that leads to the University of Connecticut Dairy Bar from Route 195 as Jerry Yang Road. That same road is the location of the Agricultural Biotechnology Laboratory, where Yang performed countless hours of research that brought international fame to the University University Honors Memory of Research Great Jerry Yang.

In 1996 Yang was first diagnosed with salivary gland adenocarcinoma, a condition that would eventually claim his life. On February 5, 2009, he died at the Brigham and Women's Hospital in Boston, Massachusetts, aged 49. An obituary was published by the scientific magazine Nature.
