= 2010 in China =

- Decades: 1990s; 2000s; 2010s; 2020s
- See also: Other events of 2010; History of China • Timeline • Years

Events in the year 2010 in China.

== Incumbents ==
- Party General Secretary - Hu Jintao
- President – Hu Jintao
- Premier – Wen Jiabao
- Vice President: Xi Jinping
- Vice Premier: Li Keqiang
- Congress Chairman - Wu Bangguo
- Conference Chairman - Jia Qinglin

=== Governors ===
- Governor of Anhui Province – Wang Sanyun
- Governor of Fujian Province – Huang Xiaojing
- Governor of Gansu Province: Xu Shousheng (until July), Xu Shousheng (starting July)
- Governor of Guangdong Province – Huang Huahua
- Governor of Guizhou Province – Lin Shusen (until August), Zhao Kezhi (starting August)
- Governor of Hainan Province – Luo Baoming
- Governor of Hebei Province – Chen Quanguo
- Governor of Heilongjiang Province – Li Zhanshu (until 27 August), Wang Xiankui (starting 27 August)
- Governor of Henan Province – Guo Gengmao
- Governor of Hubei Province – Luo Qingquan
- Governor of Hunan Province – Zhou Qiang (until December), Xu Shousheng (starting December)
- Governor of Jiangsu Province – Luo Zhijun (until December), Li Xueyong (starting December)
- Governor of Jiangxi Province – Wu Xinxiong
- Governor of Jilin Province – Wang Rulin
- Governor of Liaoning Province – Chen Zhenggao
- Governor of Qinghai Province – Song Xiuyan (until unknown), Luo Huining (starting unknown)
- Governor of Shaanxi Province – Yuan Chunqing (until June), Zhao Zhengyong (starting June)
- Governor of Shandong Province – Jiang Daming
- Governor of Shanxi Province – Wang Jun
- Governor of Sichuan Province – Jiang Jufeng
- Governor of Yunnan Province – Qin Guangrong
- Governor of Zhejiang Province – Lü Zushan

== Events ==
=== January ===
- 1 January –
  - ASEAN–China Free Trade Area: China and the Association of Southeast Asian Nations (ASEAN) launch the world's largest Free Trade Area in terms of population.
  - CCTV expand to online channel CNTV (中国网络电视台) with C-box software.
- 4 January – Yellow River oil spill: A diesel fuel leak in Shaanxi, China reaches the Yellow River, a water source for millions of people.
- 6 January – China becomes the largest exporting country, pushing Germany from first place.
- 8 January – China becomes the number one automobile market in the world.
- 11 January – 2010 Chinese anti-ballistic missile test
- 12 January –
  - Google in an unusual move revealed that its servers have been hacked in an attempt to access information about Chinese dissidents, and that Google is no longer willing to censor searches in China and may pull out of the country.
  - China's top search engine Baidu is allegedly attacked by Iranian hackers, sparking a retaliatory attack by Chinese hackers on Iranian sites.
- 15 January – 2010 Suzhou workers riot
- 19 January – Chinese senior judge Huang Songyou is sentenced to life in prison over corruption charges.
- 24 January – The Chinese government denies state involvement in the cyber attacks on Google.
- 25 January – 2008 Melamine milk re-enter supply
- 26 January – Andatee China Marine Fuel begins an initial public offering on NASDAQ
- 31 January – A M_{w} 5.2 earthquake in Sichuan province, China, kills one person and injures 11 others, destroying at least 100 homes.

=== February ===
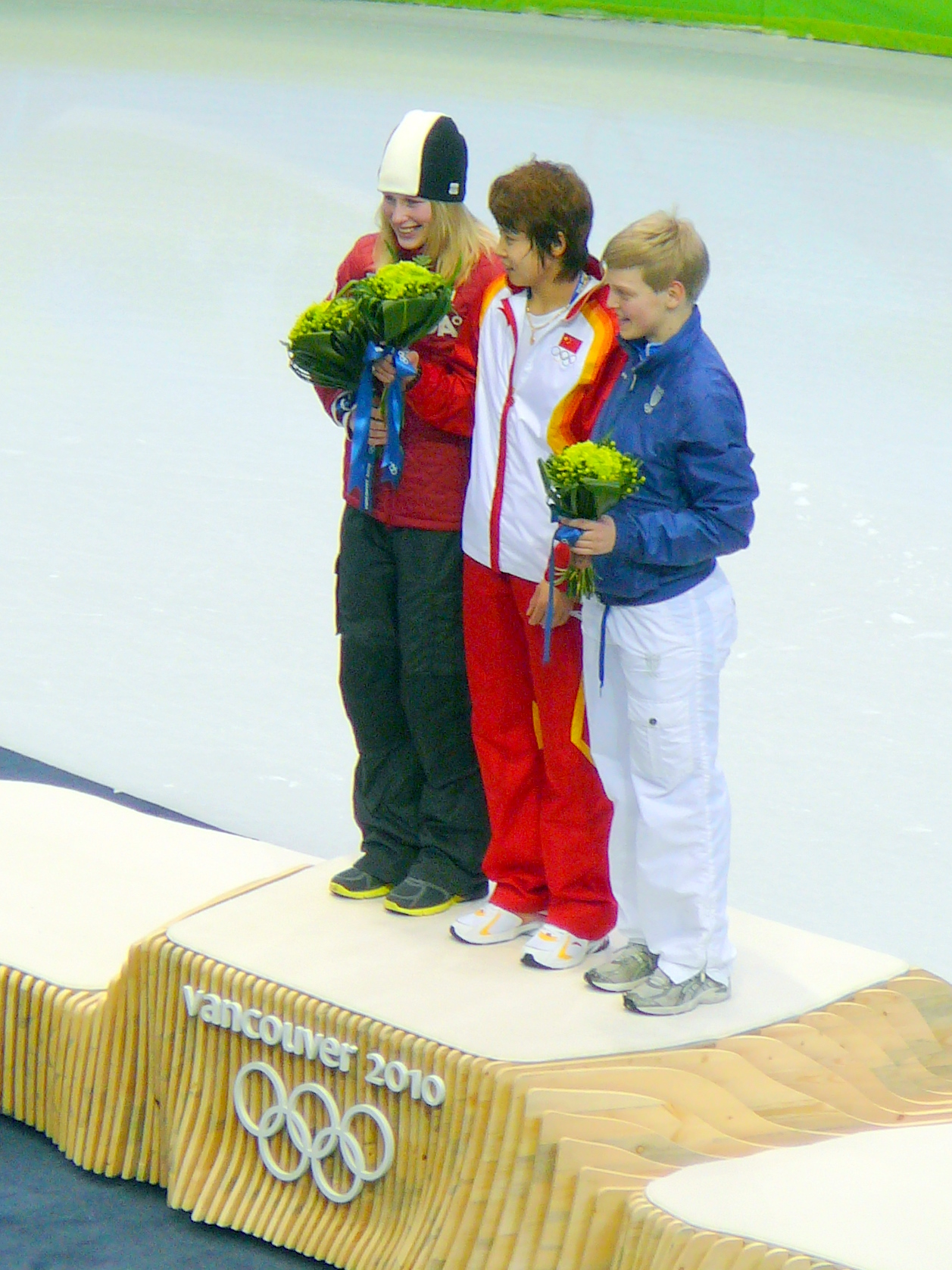
Wang Meng becomes China's first winter Olympian to win three gold medals

- 1 February – Nine people are killed in a bus rampage in Tianjin, northern China.
- 9 – 11 February – Yunnan wildfire
- 18 February –
  - Low profile meeting between 14th Dalai Lama and president Barack Obama in White House Map Room amid opposition from China.
  - Hebei Zhengding old city gate burns down
  - Asia's biggest railway station, the Guangzhou South Railway Station, came into use on the first day of Chinese spring festival transport rush of 2010.
- 23 February –
  - Oxfam Hong Kong boycott
  - Chinese authorities increases controls on the internet, requiring anyone who wishes to set up a website to produce identification and meet regulators.
  - Chinese Communist Party 52 code of ethics
- 26 February –
  - National Defense Mobilization Law is legislated in the National People's Congress (NPC).
  - Wang Meng wins her third gold medal in the 1,000 meters short track at Vancouver 2010 Winter Olympics to become China's first winter Olympian to win three gold medals at one Games and give China all the women's titles.

=== March ===
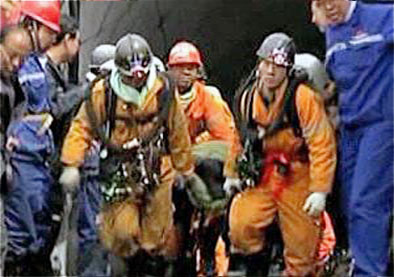
2010 Wangjialing coal mine flood

- 1 March – 2010 Luotuoshan coal mine flood
- 3 March – 2010 Guangxi wildfire
- 5 March – 2010 National People's Congress
- 11 March – Hong Kong 's TVB GM Stephen Chan and four others are arrested on charges of corruption. TVB suspends Chan and two TVB staff were suspended from their duties.
- 13 March – Shenyang zoo scandal
- 14 March – 314 Taipei protest
- 15 March – 2010 Dongxing Coal Mining Co fire
- 19 March – Northern China sandstorm
- 20 March – 2010 China drought
- 23 March –
  - At 3 am Hong Kong Time (UTC+8), Google started to redirect all search queries from Google.cn to Google.com.hk. (Google Hong Kong), thereby bypassing Chinese regulators and allowing uncensored Simplified Chinese search results.
  - Nanping school massacre: A man in Nanping, China, stabs and kills eight children, and wounds another five at an elementary school.
- 27 March – Tao Hui-xi (陶惠西) self-immolation incident in Lianyungang, Jiangsu
- 28 March – 2010 Wangjialing coal mine flood: At least 152 coal miners are trapped after a pit floods in Shanxi, while 109 others escape.

=== April ===
- 1 April – First ever organ trafficking trial in the PRC (est.)
- 4 April – 114 miners trapped in a flooded mine for more than a week in Shanxi, China, are rescued.
- 6 April – One of leading smartphone brand, Xiaomi was founded.
- 10–14 April – 2010 IIHF Women's Challenge Cup of Asia
- 13 April –
  - Hu Jintao, President of the People's Republic of China, meets with President Barack Obama to discuss Iran's nuclear program.
  - Shanghai Oriental Pearl Tower fire
- 14 April – 2010 Yushu earthquake: A magnitude 6.9 earthquake strikes in Qinghai, China, killing at least 2,000 and injuring more than 10,000.
- 16 April – Yan Xiaoling - Fan Yanqiong Case
- 22 April –
  - Emeishan City self-immolation incident
  - Huang Guangyu, founder of GOME Electrical Appliances and formerly China's richest man, goes on trial for bribery in Beijing.
- 24 April – Ben ren Yu (郁伯仁) PRC diplomat assaulted in Houston
- 25 April – 13 June – 2010 earthquake prediction case
- 29 April - Xu Yuyuan mass stabbing incident: Twenty-eight children and three adults are stabbed at a nursery school in China.
- 30 April - 2010 Shanghai Expo opening ceremony

=== May ===
- 1 May – Expo 2010 officially opens.
- 5 May
  - Landslides killed 15 Chinese workers in the Tengchong County, Yunnan Province.
  - Charm Communications domestic television advertising company begins trading on the NASDAQ Stock Market.
- 6 May – A powerful tornado hits Chongqing municipality in south-western China, killing at least 25 and injuring more than 160 people in Dianjiang and Liangping counties.
- 7 May – Ren Zhiqiang (任志强) real estate tycoon shoe throwing incident
- 9 May – At least 115 dead as fierce rainstorms begin ravaging Southern China
- 11 – 9 May trapped miners found dead in coal gas leak in northwest China's Gansu Province Tuesday.
- 12 May –
  - Hanzhong mass stabbing incident: an attacker killed seven children and two adults and injured 11 other persons with a cleaver at a kindergarten in Hanzhong, Shaanxi.
  - The Chengdu-Dujiangyan High-Speed Railway begins operation in Sichuan, China.
- 13 May – 2010 Yuanyang colliery outburst
- 17 May – Six people are attacked with a meat cleaver before the assailant commits suicide at a market in Foshan, China.
- 23 May – 2010 Jiangxi train derailment: A train traveling from Shanghai to Guilin derails in a mountainous area near Fuzhou, Jiangxi, China, and is destroyed, killing at least 19 and injuring 71 others.
- 24 May – HK democrat and Beijing delegate meeting
- 25 May – 2nd round U.S.–China Strategic and Economic Dialogue

=== June ===
- 1 June –
  - 2010 Chinese labour unrest 2010 Foxconn suicides (est. date)
  - Yongzhou courthouse shooting
- 4 June – Dandong shooting incident
- 11 June – 2010 Ma'anshan riot
- 12 June – Chinese Buddhist monks and archaeologists revealed what they believe to be a part of the skull of Siddartha Gautama, the founder of Buddhism, in east China's Jiangsu Province.
- 12 – 20 June – 2010 Shanghai International Film Festival
- 13 June – 2010 South China floods
- 15 June – Heavy rain triggers landslides that leave at least 24 people dead in Sichuan province's Kangding county. In one incident, part of a mountain fell on a construction site in Sichuan province, crushing workers who were sleeping in tents.
- 19 June – 2010 South China floods: Flooding in South China kills at least 88 people, and forces nearly 750,000 people to leave their homes.
- 19 – 25 June - 2nd Straits Forum
- 21 June – At least 46 people are killed and dozens more trapped after a mine blast in Henan, central China.
- 27 June – A coal mine explosion kills 5 in China's Ningxia Hui Autonomous Region.
- 28 June –
  - Heilongjiang wildfire
  - Guizhou landslide
  - Fifth Chen-Chiang summit
- 29 June – Economic Cooperation Framework Agreement (ECFA) signed
- 30 June – Xinjiang UFO intercontinental ballistic missile debate

=== July ===
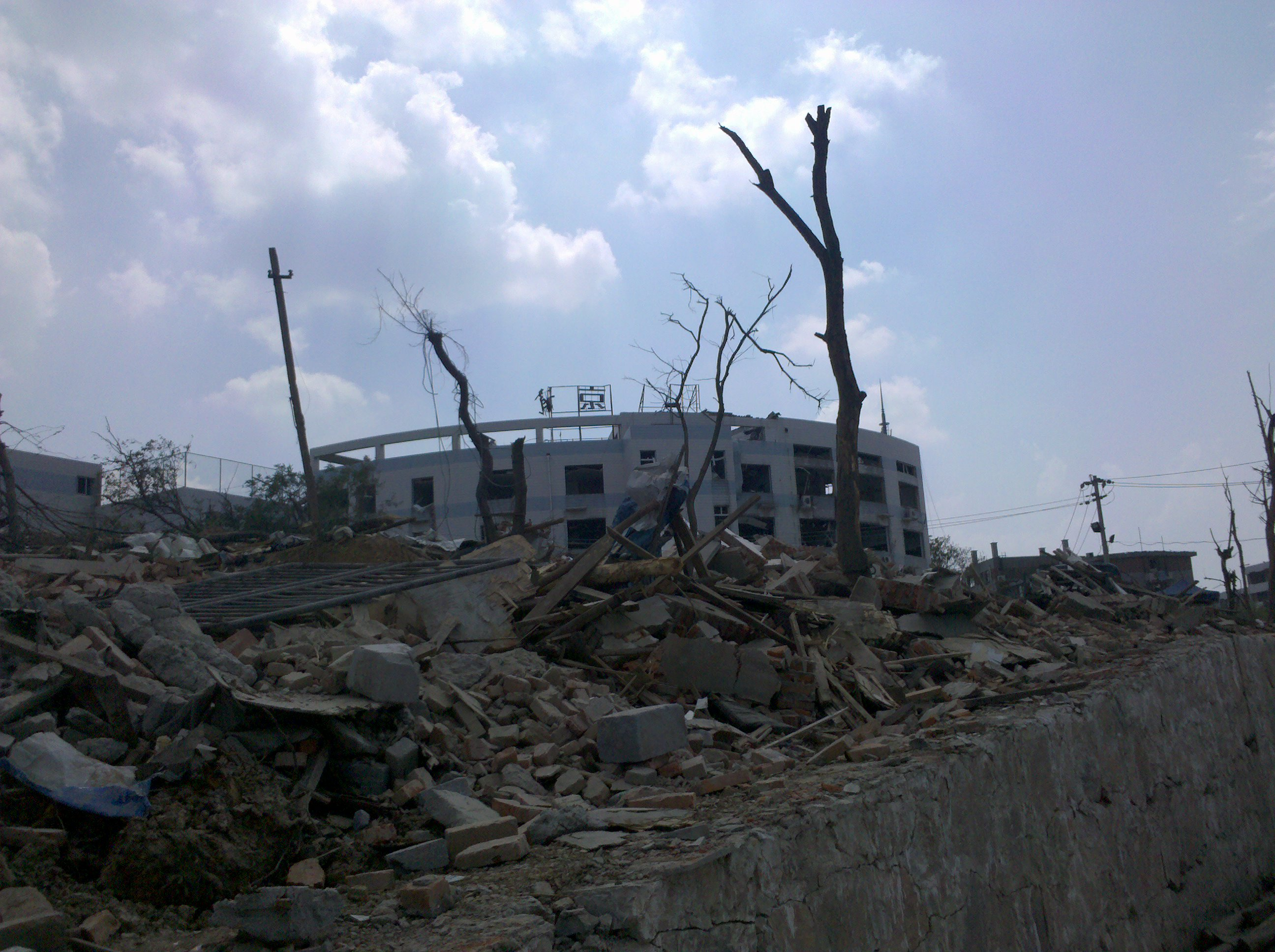
2010 Nanjing chemical plant explosion

- 1 July –
  - China's Xinhua launches a global 24-hour English TV news channel.
  - The Shanghai–Nanjing High-Speed Railway goes into operation.
- 3 July - Zijin acid waste mining disaster
- 5 July - 2010 Asian Men's Club Volleyball Championship
- 6 July – Giant painting (浩氣長流) revealed, featuring Chinese Communist Party and KMT figures together
- 7 July –
  - Taiwan to allow solo-mainland tourists with some flag controversy
  - Hangzhou Xiaoshan International Airport shutdown due to UFO
  - Wen Qiang, the former director of the Chongqing Municipal Bureau of Justice, is executed following the Chongqing gang trials
- 11 July – 2010 Xinfa aluminum plant protest
- 13 – 17 July people die and a further 44 are missing in Chinese landslides.
- 14 July – Typhoon Conson
- 17 July –
  - China National Petroleum Corporation Xingang Port oil spill
  - Twenty-eight coal miners die after a fire in their mine near Hancheng City in China's Shaanxi Province.
- 18 July – A bus falls off a cliff in the Garzê Tibetan Autonomous Prefecture in southwestern China resulting in the death of 23 people.
- 25 July – 2010 Pro-Cantonese rally
- 27 July – South China floods: A bridge collapse in Luanchuan County in Henan Province of China results in at least 37 deaths.
- 28 July – 2010 Nanjing chemical plant explosion – An explosion at a plastics factory in Nanjing, China, kills at least 12 people and injures hundreds.
- 30 July – Changsha IRD Building Bombings
- 31 July – An explosion in a coal mine in Shanxi Province, China leaves 17 people dead while 24 miners are trapped by flooding in a nearby mine.

=== August ===
- 1 August –
  - Floods in northeastern China kill more than 100 people and sweep 3,000 chemical-filled barrels into the Songhua River.
  - Hebei tractor rampage: A drunk man on a tractor kills 17 people and injures many others in a rampage in northern China.
- 3 August - 2010 Weiyuan riot
- 6 August – China suspends traffic on the Yalu River and evacuates more than 40,000 people from Dandong over fears of flooding amid unprecedented levels of rainfall.
- 7 August – At least 16 miners are killed during a fire at a gold mine in Zhaoyuan, Shandong, in China. 23 others are still trapped inside.
- 8 August – 2010 Gansu mudslide: At least 1,471 people have died and 294 missing following landslides caused by heavy rains in China's northwestern Gansu province.
- 14 August - China National Highway 110 traffic jam
- 17 August - North Korean MiG-21 fighter jet crashed in Fushun County, Liaoning
- 19 August – 2010 Aksu bombing: Seven people are killed and fourteen injured in a bomb attack in China's Xinjiang province.
- 21 August – PRC North Korea border flood
- 24 August – Henan Airlines Flight 8387 overruns the runway on landing at Lindu Airport, China. 42 of the 96 people on board were killed.

=== September ===
- 1 September –
  - 2010 China floods: Eight people are killed and 40 missing in landslides that hit Wama village in Yunnan province, near Baoshan.
  - Typhoon Kompasu
- 3 September – Landslides in the village of Wama near Baoshan in China kill at least 12 people with 36 missing.
- 7 September - 2010 Senkaku boat collision incident part of Diaoyu Islands dispute
- 10 September - Yihuang self-immolation incident
- 19–6 September dolphins from Japan arrive at Beijing ocean park
- 21 September - Overseas Chinese World Conference for Promoting Peaceful Reunification of China
- 26 September - "Designed in Hong Kong, made by Cantonese" label discussion

=== October ===
- 1 October - The Chang'e 2 lunar probe launches from the Xichang Satellite Launch Center.
- 6 October – 150th anniversary of Burning of Old Summer Palace
- 7 October - Hainan flood
- 8 October - The imprisoned human rights activist Liu Xiaobo was awarded the 2010 Nobel Peace Prize "for his long and non-violent struggle for fundamental human rights in China"
- 9 October - Chinese basketball team withdrew from 2010 Asian university basketball championship due to ROC flag used instead of Chinese Taipei flag.
- 16 October - Li Gang incident
- 19 October - 2010 Tibetan language protest
- 22 October - Terracotta Army archaeology team wins Spain's Prince of Asturias Awards
- 28 October - China's Tianhe-1 becomes the world's fastest supercomputer, replacing Jaguar in this position, performing at peak computing rate of 2,507 petaflops.

=== November ===
- 1 November - Sixth National Population Census of the People's Republic of China
- 6 November - Jiangmen star park opening
- 12 November – 2010 Asian Games opening ceremony
- 12 – 27 November – 2010 Asian Games held in Guangzhou
- 15 November - 2010 Shanghai fire
- 27 November - Qingdao Metropolis Convenience Daily newspaper assault on journalists

=== December ===
- 5 December -
  - 2010 Dawu fire
  - 2010 Zhangjiagang hospital incident
- 10 December -
  - HK journalists attacked at activist Zhao Lianhai's apartment
  - Liu Xiaobo absent at 2010 Nobel Peace Prize ceremony
- 18 December - 2010 Eocheong boat collision incident

=== Date unknown ===
- Bashan 125R motorcycle begins production by the Bashan Motorcycle Manufacturing Co.Ltd in Chongqing.
- Handheld Culture online bookstore is founded.

== Deaths ==
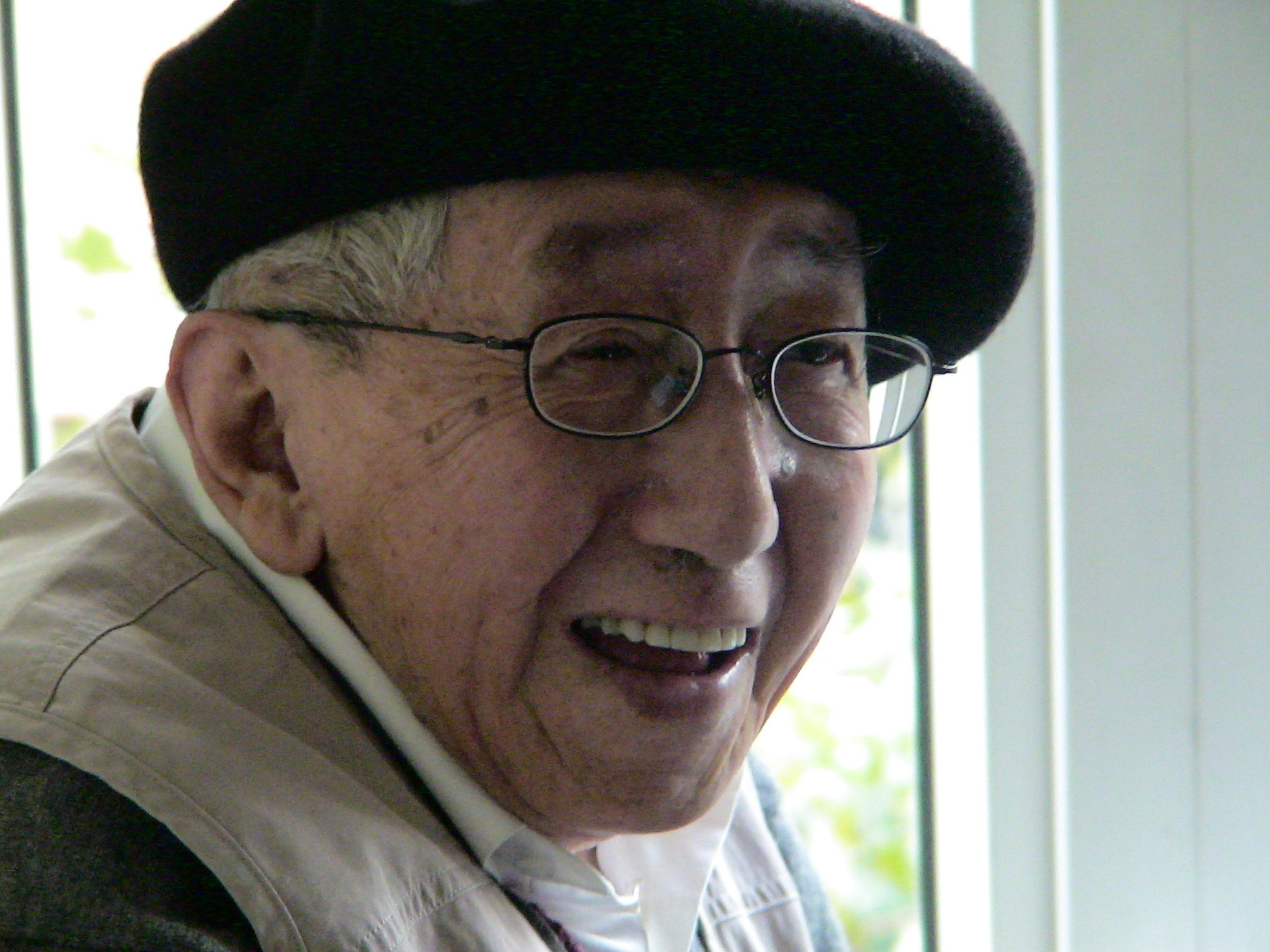
Te Wei

- 2 February –
  - Ng Teng Fong, 82, Chinese-born Singaporean businessman, complications from a cerebral hemorrhage.
  - Raymond Wang Chong Lin, 88, Chinese Roman Catholic prelate, Bishop of Zhaoxian, cerebral hemorrhage.
- 3 February – Qian Chunqi, Chinese doctor and translator (born 1921)
- 4 February – Te Wei, 95, Chinese animator, respiratory failure.
- 14 February – Zhang Yalin, 28, Chinese football player, lymphoma.
- 10 March – Leeann Chin, 77, Chinese-born American restaurateur, founder of Leeann Chin restaurants, after long illness.
- 13 March – He Pingping, 21, Chinese dwarf, shortest man who was able to walk, heart complications.
- 26 April – D.C. Lau, 89, Chinese sinologist.
- 17 May – Walasse Ting, 80, Chinese-born American visual artist.
- 7 June – Chai Zemin, 93, Chinese diplomat.
- 25 June – Wu Guanzhong, 90, Chinese painter.
- 5 July – Jia Hongsheng, 43, Chinese actor, suicide by jumping.
- 15 July – Luo Pinchao, 98, Chinese opera singer.
- 29 July – Zheng Ji, 110, Chinese nutritionist and biochemist, world's oldest professor.
- 30 July – Chien Wei-zang, 96, Chinese physicist and applied mathematician.
- 18 October – Peng Chong, 95, Chinese politician, former Vice Chairperson of the Standing Committee of the National People's Congress.
- 28 October – Liang Congjie, 78, Chinese environmentalist (Friends of Nature), lung infection.

== See also ==
- 2010 in Chinese film
- 2010 in Chinese football
- Chinese Football Association Yi League 2010
- Chinese Football Association Jia League 2010
- Chinese Super League 2010
