= 2010 mining disaster =

2010 mining disaster may refer to:

- Luotuoshan coal mine flood near Wuhai, People's Republic of China (March 1)
- Dongxing Coal Mining Co fire at Xinmi, People's Republic of China (March 15)
- Wangjialing coal mine flood at Shanxi, People's Republic of China (March 28)
- Upper Big Branch Mine disaster at Raleigh County, West Virginia (April 5)
- Raspadskaya mine explosion near Mezhdurechensk, Kemerovo Oblast, Russia (May 8)
- Yuanyang colliery outburst at Puding County, People's Republic of China (May 13)
- Zonguldak mine disaster at Zonguldak Province in Turkey (May 17)
- Copiapó mining accident at Copiapó, Chile (August 5)
- Pike River Mine accident near Greymouth, New Zealand (November 19)
