= Flooded mine =

Excavation for mineral extraction filled by water

A flooded mine is one of the direct results of a mine's closure procedure. When a mine stops operating, its maintenance systems also stop, in which the dewatering systems are included. Without these systems the mine will get flooded by water that naturally occurs in rock formations in the ground.

== Overview ==
A flooded shaft in Ecton Mine, UK.

Mining operations can occur over a long period of time, from several years to several decades, and in order to keep the mining operations running, water has to be removed from the mine as it accumulates. After the mine is closed, when its operational life ends, the maintenance systems stop, including the dewatering systems. Without dewatering, the mines tend to flood with surface and groundwaters in the lower levels and mined spaces, if there is not a drainage adit present.

The flooding process of an open-pit or underground mine can take from a several months period to more than a decade, depending on factors such as volume of open space in the mine, availability of infiltration water and on the nature of flooding - it can be uncontrolled, controlled or monitored.

== Open pit mines ==
Flooding in open pit mines leads to the so-called pit lakes, where a wide range of creatures can be seen. The flooding process happens because the drainage wells or dewatering pumps are stopped and the open spaces are filled with groundwater and surface runoff from precipitation and water bodies (e.g. rivers). Waters quality in flooded open pit mines can range from drinking water quality to acidic waters that can kill animals if drunk.

== Underground mines ==
Flooding in underground mines is usually controlled. These types of mines are not directly influenced by surface waters, so it is mainly underground water that plays a role in the flooding. One of the main reasons to let an underground mine be flooded is to avoid disulfide oxidation, and thus avoid acid mine drainage. Other important reason is safety: people coming to underground mines without safety precautions or the presence of dangerous mine gases.

The controlled flooding of underground mines usually follows these guidelines:

- Removal of potential water hazards
- Fill the surfaces that might collapse during or after the flooding process
- Install water diversion systems
- Install, at both the surface and underground, a system to monitor hydrogeological and geotechnical aspects
- Make a projection of hydrological and hydrogeochemical development of mine waters

== Reasons for mine flooding ==
There are a wide range of factors that lead to mine flooding. Six of those main reasons are:

- The mine ceases to be economically important
- Depletion of raw materials
- Political reasons, war or accidents
- Instability of the mine workings
- Prevention of disulfide oxidation
- Safety reasons

In some locations, there are discussions to use flooded mines for pumped-storage hydroelectric reservoirs, but finished projects are still missing.

== Historical mine flooding disasters ==
- Chasnala mine
- Quecreek Mine
- Wangjialing mine
- Knox Mine
- Milford Mine
- Luotuoshan mine
- Barnes-Hecker Mine Disaster
- Jiangjiawan Mine
