= Mount Longmen (Shanxi) =

Mountain in Shanxi, China

Lóngmén Shān
- Chinese: 龙门山; Chinese: 龍門山 pinyin: Lóngmén Shān
- Location within China

Highest point
- Elevation: 1,087 m (3,566 ft)
- Coordinates: 35°42′15″N 110°38′55″E

Naming
- English translation: dragon gate mountain
- Language of name: Chinese
- Pronunciation: Mandarin: [lʊŋ˧˥mən˧˥ʂ̺an˥]

Geography
- Location: Shanxi, China

Lóngmén Shān, Mount Longmen or Longmen Mountain is a mountain in Shanxi province, China. In March–April 2010, the Wangjialing coal mine flood occurred here.

== Geography ==
Lóngmén Shān is where the Yellow River abruptly leaves the vast, rugged expanse of the Loess Plateau that spreads out in the mountain's north and west to enter a plain which connects both to the nearby Linfen Basin in the east and to the Guanzhong Plain further southwest. The mountain is thus a part of the Loess Plateau's southern edge. At the same time, it forms the south-western extreme point of the Lüliang Mountains, a range that runs parallel to the river as it flows south.

The spot at Lóngmén Shān's southwestern tip where the Yellow River breaks through is called Yǔménkǒu (traditional Chinese: 禹門口; simplified Chinese: 禹门口; pinyin: Yǔménkǒu, "Yu's doorway, or gate"). Here, three bridges span the Yellow River. As there are no other nearby bridges either upstream or downstream, this is the only dry connection from Xiangning County and Hejin (in Shanxi province) across the river to Hancheng (in Shaanxi province), hence the name Xiang-Han Yellow River Bridge(s) (Chinese: 乡韩黄河大桥; pinyin: Xiāng-Hán Huáng Hé Dàqiáo).

From Yǔménkǒu, Lóngmén Shān stretches in a straight northeasterly direction and then slightly bends eastward toward its opposite end, where a ravine (Chinese: 青石峪; pinyin: Qīngshí Yù) breaks through to the plain, separating Lóngmén Shān from the rest of the Lüliang Mountains.

== Administration ==
Administratively, the main part of Lóngmén Shān is in the county-level city of Hejin in the prefecture-level city of Yuncheng; only the mountain's northeastern end reaches into Xiangning County in the prefecture-level city of Linfen. All these are in the province of Shanxi, but the similarly named province of Shaanxi is just across the Yellow River that forms the boundary between these two provinces until much further upstream and downstream.
