= Qinhuangdao Wildlife Park =

Safari park in Qinhuangdao, China

- Date opened: 1995
- Location: Qinhuangdao, China
- Land area: 5,000 acres (2,000 ha)
- No. of animals: 7,000+
- No. of species: 150
- Website: www.qhdzoo.com

Qinhuangdao Wildlife Park (Chinese: 秦皇岛野生动物园; pinyin: Qínhuángdǎo yěshēng dòngwùyuán) is a safari park located in Qinhuangdao in northeast China. It opened in 1995 and is the country's second largest wildlife park. The park covers an area of some 5,000 acres and is home to roughly 7,000 animals of more than 150 species, including tigers, lions, bears, elephants, white tigers and a range of birds. Visitors can travel through the park by foot, car or train.

== History ==
In 2008, The Sunday Telegraph reported that undercover investigators had been offered the chance to buy wine made from the crushed bones of tigers at the park.

On 12 August 2015, a female tourist was killed when she was attacked by one of the tigers while driving through the safari park. She was attacked when she left her car, which is against park rules.
