= Mine dewatering =

Mine dewatering is the action of removing groundwater from a mine. When a mine extends below the water table groundwater will, due to gravity, infiltrate the mine working. On some projects groundwater is a minor impediment that can be dealt with on an ad-hoc basis. In other mines, and in other geological settings, dewatering is fundamental to the viability of the mine and may require the use of very large resources and management.

== History ==
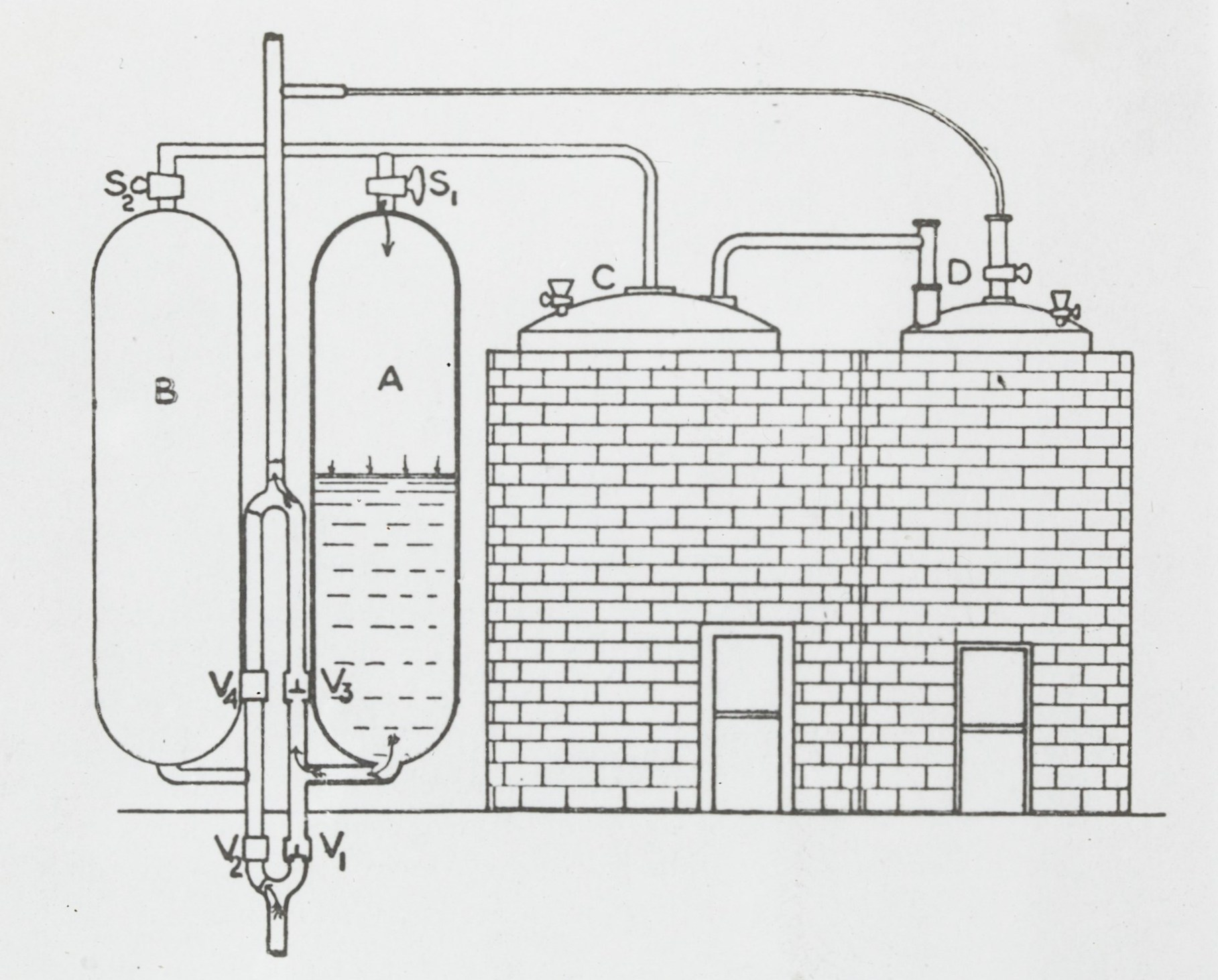
Thomas Savery's mine water pump engine

Schematic Newcomen engine. – Steam (pink), water (blue) – Valves open (blue), valves closed (red)

The act of taking water from a mine that is being operated has been done since Neolithic times. In the past it was done by using a shadoof, digging deeper dikes so that gravity would remove the water, by mounting leather water-filled buckets on water wheels or, if nothing else, carrying water-filled buckets manually. The Archimedes' screw was also historically used to pump water out of mines. Where no dewatering techniques were effective the mine had to be shut down due to flooding.

In the 15th century mine dewatering techniques made some technical advancements as the first mechanized wooden pumps were used in the German Rammelsberg mine (Lower Saxony), and later in the Ehrenfriedersdorf (Saxony) mines in the 16th century.

With the Industrial Revolution, the demand for more coal also demanded dewatering of ever-deeper mines. Water was put in buckets and removed using rope conveyors powered by horses on treadmills. Thomas Savery was the first to realize that a steam engine could be used to pump water out of mines, so he patented an early form of a steam engine. His proposed engine however, was ineffective and problematic in design. It could not pump water higher than 9 metres (30 ft) above water level.

The atmospheric engine, invented by Thomas Newcomen in 1712, combined the ideas of Thomas Savery, who he was forced to go into partnership with due to Savery's patent, and Denis Papin, using his invention of a piston. It was the first practical application of the steam engine in a mine and was used to dewater coal and tin mines. The first reliable metal pump was developed by József Károly Hell and used in Schemnitz in 1749.

In the 20th century submersible pumps offered another innovation in mine dewatering. Currently dewatering techniques and systems are so advanced and well defined for each type of mine - open pit or underground - that even mines thousands of metres deep are successfully dewatered.

== Problems with mine dewatering ==
Dewatering a totally or partially flooded mine, or even as a normal procedure in normal mine activity, may carry a number of problems, most of which are environment related. This can happen in open pit mines as well as in underground mines. Large problems are also developing with abandoned mines that have accumulated acid mine drainage that are growing to become a larger problem as the water sits in the mine and reacts with the exposed rock. There can be mitigation through proper management and with enough funds.

The most relevant concerns with mine dewatering are related to acid mine drainage and the dispersal of contaminated water into other water fonts and the general environment becoming a serious source of pollution.

== Types of dewatering techniques and systems ==
Dewatering open pit mines and underground mines is different. Each method relies on different apparel and techniques.

For dewatering open pit mines the following are used:

- Filter wells
- Disposal wells
- Inverted wells
- Vacuum drainage
- Horizontal drains
- Sealing walls
- Cut off walls
- Guard wells

Underground, the following methods are used:

- Adits
- Sump pumps

== See also ==
- Sough
- Dewatering
