= Tiger bone wine =

Alcoholic beverage originally produced in China using the bones of tigers

Tiger Bone Wine or Hu Gu Jiu
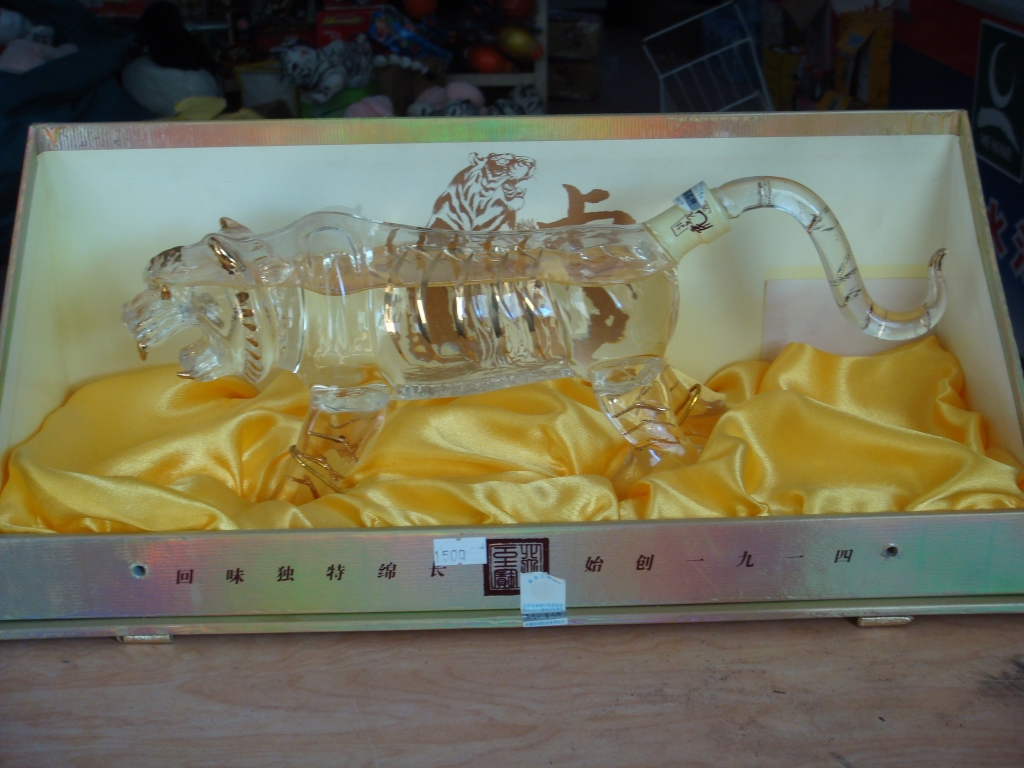
- Bone strengthening wine for sale in Qinhuangdao, China
- Origin: China
- Alcohol by volume: 58%
- Ingredients: Rice wine or white wine, tiger bones, ginger, sage

Tiger bone wine (Chinese: 虎骨酒; pinyin: Hǔ gǔ jiǔ) is an alcoholic beverage originally produced in China using the bones of tigers as a necessary ingredient. The production process takes approximately eight years and results in a high alcohol concentration. According to traditional Chinese medicine, the specific use of certain body parts is capable of healing diseases according to the characteristics of the animal used to obtain the product, that is believed to be connected with the disease of the person.

== History ==
In the Chinese culture, it was a tradition to use wines as a cure for diseases; this practice dates back to the Han dynasty's period of domination. The first reference to the specific involvement of tigers in the creation of the wine is around 500 AD. The demand for products containing animal body parts accelerated in the 1980s, during the process of industrialisation and the concomitant population increase: in this way, the booming of the middle class has led to more affordability to the purchase of these. The decreasing availability of tiger parts resulted in substantially higher prices, with bottles sold for hundreds of dollars each. In the 1990s, biologists and other researchers identified that the number of tigers used to make tiger bone wine (which were mainly from South China) had severely decreased. Traditional medicine's excessive demand for exotic-animal body parts is claimed to be a major factor in the tiger's current state of functional extinction.

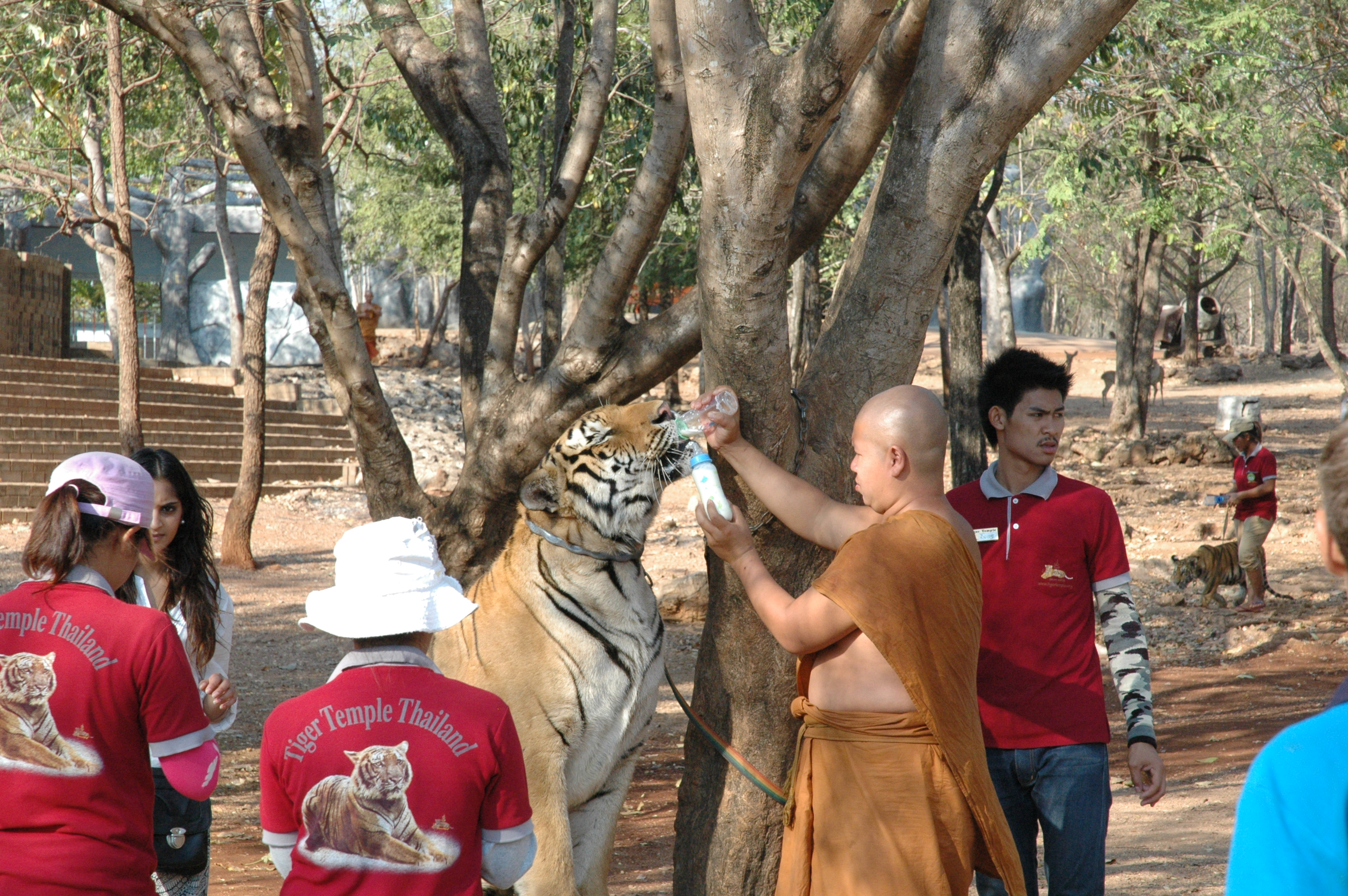
A tiger being fed in Thailand's Tiger Temple.

Tiger wine production and commercialisation continued, although the ingredient of the animal has been omitted from the labels since then: the production of the tonic wine went on despite the ban on trading the animal components due to the existence of tiger farms together with legal shortcomings and few government regulations. In 1986, the first tiger farm was created in South China. This type of facility was classified as a zoo, until it was discovered that its actual function was to breed tigers like livestock. These facilities are managed so that tigers reproduce quickly, and newborns are removed from their mothers soon after birth so that the females can more quickly produce another cub. Tiger farms are located in China, Southeast Asia, and South Africa. In February 2018, these facilities were estimated to host more than 8,000 tigers, double the number in the wild. An investigation in Thailand led to the discovery of a disguised tiger farm with an income of about 3 million dollars a year. In a raid in 2016, Thai authorities seized the 137 tigers in a temple that lead to the discovery of tiger parts and 40 dead tiger cubs which were about to be used for wines and medical purposes. The consumption of tiger bone wine is believed to be limited mostly to the elder part of the population, since traditional medicine is being replaced by more modern, evidence-based medicine among younger people.

== Geography ==
The concept of tiger bone wine originated in China, but its use has spread throughout Asia and worldwide. Although the tigers used to make wine were traded from various places, most countries' import and export operations have been disguised. Since 1992 China has continued to export tigers’ bones to South Korea, as well as to India and Malaysia. Also European countries, such as Czech Republic, are believed to have contributed to the commerce of various parts of the animal in interest to Asia. The tigers used to make Tiger Bone Wine are taken from the farms. The farms are mostly allocated in China, Thailand, Laos and Vietnam. Even if the trade of tigers to make health tonics is said to be furnished by indigenous tigers, many safari and wildlife parks used to promote that the tiger bone wine was produced by captive tigers. Examples of this are the Badaling Safari Park in Beijing (October 2005) and a park in Shanghai, which also sold the wine. In 2007 the tiger breeding center in Heilongjiang was defined as another place where the wine was commercialised. In 2004, it was established a new factory, the Xiongsen Wine Producing Ltd. Co, in the Guilin-based Xiongsen Bear and Tiger Mountain Village, where the wine was produced and sold.

== Typical ingredients ==
The main component of tiger bone wine is tiger bones, which are crushed and then left to macerate for several years in a liqueur made from rice. For each 1 kilogram (2.2 lb) of bones, about 15 litres (3.3 imp gal) of wine are obtained. Their price increases according to the period of ageing.

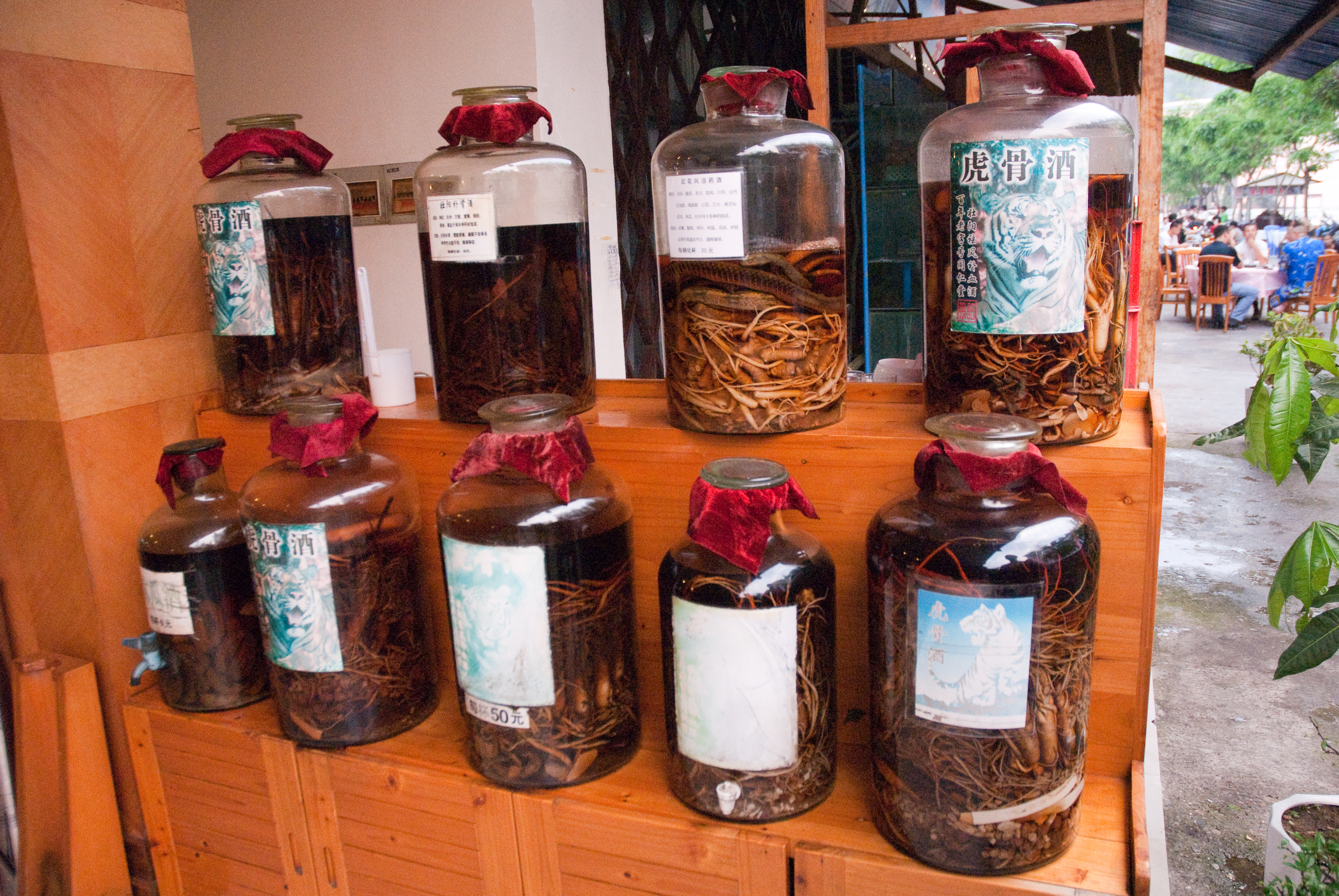
Tiger bones and parts extract sold in Möng La, Shan State, Myanmar

The active ingredient per unit volume is fixed and, therefore, it may be used to control the therapeutic dose. In addition to the bones of the animal, other ingredients are:

- rice wine or baijiu
- ginger;
- sage.

Two kinds of tiger bone wine are sold: the true one, made with the bones of tigers and other felines; and the common tiger bone wine, containing bones obtained from various other species, such as dogs, pigs, bears and horses. The cost of "common" tiger bone wine is significantly cheaper than a "true" one.

=== Variants ===
The original ingredients are often commonly substituted with herbs, similarly as in the case of the liniment Dit Da Jow: even in those cases, the beverage is still referred to as "tiger bone wine." There are more than 200 variants, produced with angelica, licorice, scutellaria, and/or Ligusticum chuanxiong (川芎 chuānxiōng), which generally generate the same effects and reactions in those who use them. Goat blood, python meat, psoralen, cockroaches, bezoars, moss, rhinoceros horns, and Cordyceps sinensis are sometimes included in the beverage.

== Production ==
The production has not changed over the past centuries, using the following steps:

1. After the skin and muscles are peeled off, bones and even entire skeletons arrive at the distillery where they are soaked several times in alcohol.
2. The bones are then removed, and the remaining liquid is put into phials.
3. The phials are stored in batches to mature for a minimum of three years, before they are ready to be distributed.

Tiger bone wine is easier to preserve in its bottle form and, being highly alcoholic, it may be stored for a long time without spoiling.

== Medical purposes ==
Ancient traditional Chinese medicine sources has ascribed the tiger bone with uses, none of which have been proven in any randomized controlled trial. The Beiji qianjin yaofang (652) claims that it helps with rheumatism, arthritis, stiffness or paralysis in lower back and legs, weak "Kidney", and general weakness. The later Compendium of Materia Medica (1578) credits tiger bones with a longer list of functions: driving off evil spirits, ghosts, and poisons; stopping convulsions; and treating acne.

The ancient records have molded into a belief that it increases virility in men and boosts intelligence in whoever consumes it.

== Controversy and conservation issues ==
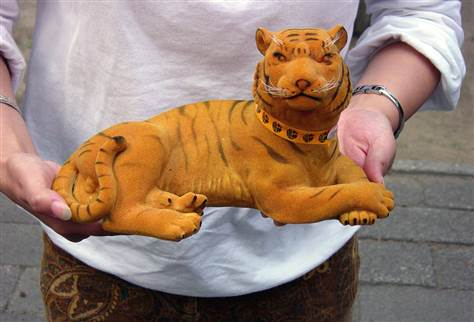
This product is packaged in tiger-shaped bottles.

The trade in endangered species has been subject to international ban since 1987, and has been prohibited by the Chinese government since 1993, when China joined the Convention on Biological Diversity, previously opened for signature for the Earth Summit in 1992.

Examinations conducted by different NGOs, such as the Environmental Investigation Agency, have reported that several 'farms' are closely linked to the production and distribution of the liquor on the black markets.

Around 1,800 tigers are kept in the tiger farms of Xiongsen Bear and Tiger Mountain Village, in Guilin, in southwest China, in order to be used to produce as many as 200,000 bottles every year.

In 2008, the U.K.-based Sunday Telegraph reported that undercover investigators had been offered the chance to buy wine made from the crushed bones of tigers at the Qinhuangdao Wildlife Park rescue centre in north China's Hebei Province, as well as at the Badaling safari park in Beijing.

Starting from January 2017, as suggested by the former Minister of Water and Environmental Affairs of South Africa Edna Molewa, a dispatch of approximately 800 skeletons of lions coming from captive breeding will be sent in Asia in order to be used as a substitute of the traditional local tiger ingredients used.

From 29 October 2018, the commerce of both rhino horns and tiger bones has been legalised in China for medical research and "clinical treatment of critical, severe and difficult diseases". According to the announcement, tiger parts have to be taken from farmed tigers dead from natural causes, and can be used only in "qualified hospitals by qualified doctors recognised by the State Administration of Traditional Chinese Medicine". This unpredicted decision has yet to be explained to the public, but experts believe that it can be considered as an economic move, due to the high value that the commerce of traditional Chinese medicine has on Asian markets.

=== Replacements ===
Modern-day traditional Chinese medicine (TCM) practitioners in China believe in the effects of tiger bone but have also sought less legally-encumbered replacement materials. One is the bones of Eospalax baileyi (or Eospalax fontanierii). The other is a propriety mix of bone powders from three species. Both claim to be very similar to real tiger bone in terms of elemental and peptide composition, animal testing results, and even in clinical trial results.

== Gallery ==
In December 2011, an auction house based in Beijing auctioned about 400 bottles, in the guise of health tonics and liquors. The auction was interrupted due to the intervention of IFAW. Eventually, the Chinese government agreed to stop the sale of hundreds of bottles that were exposed at the auction.

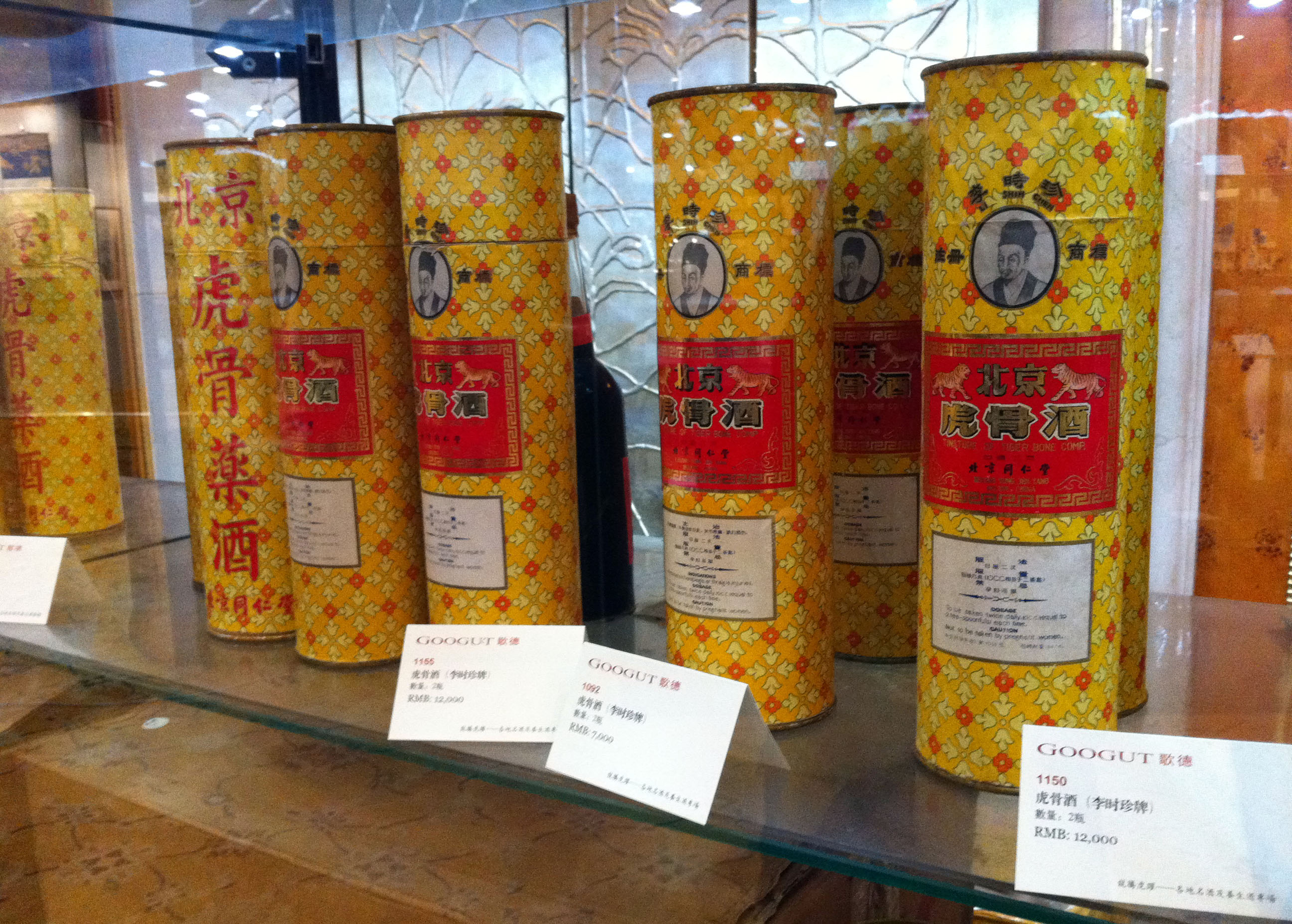

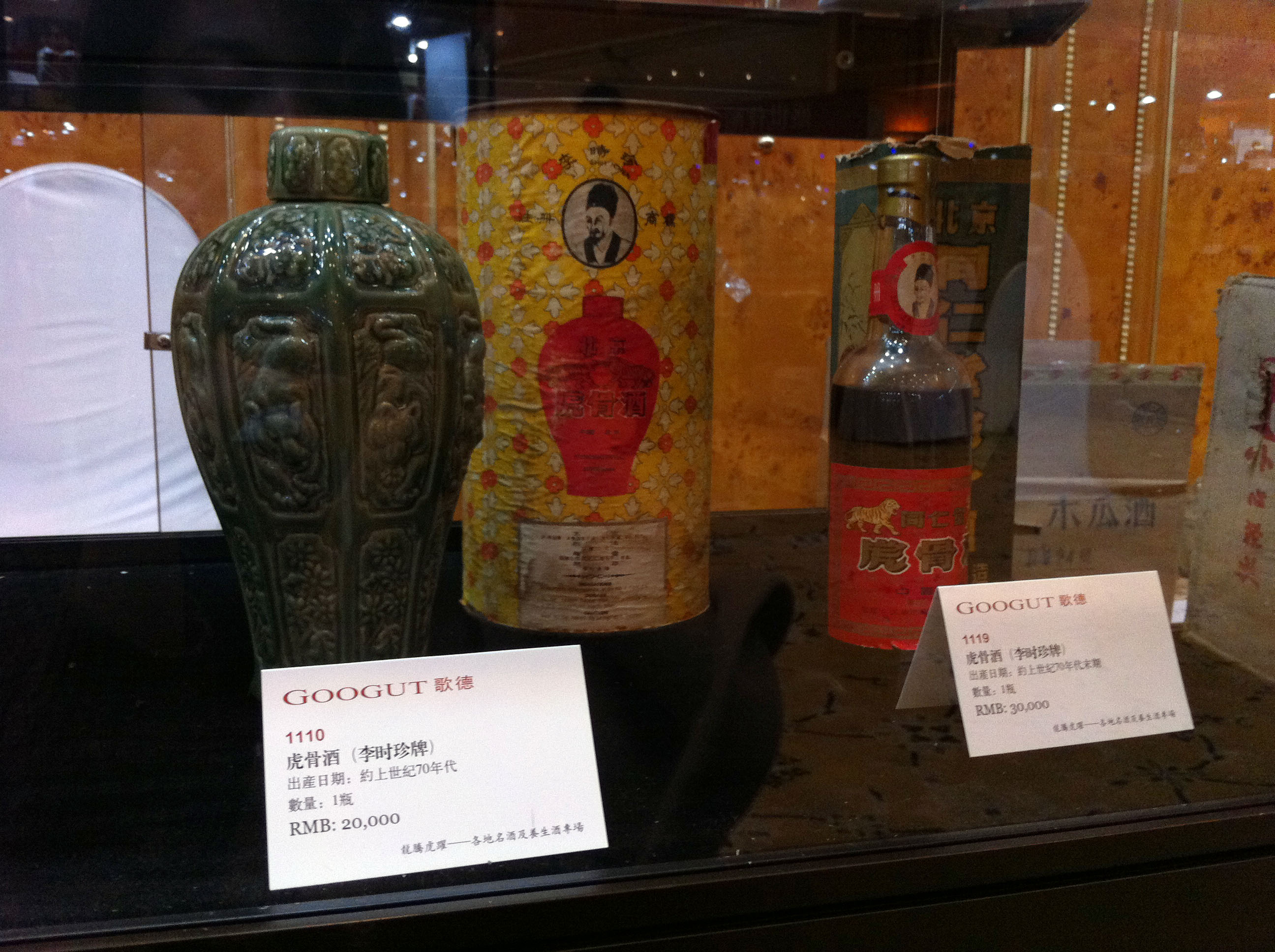
Pictures of Tiger Bone Wine

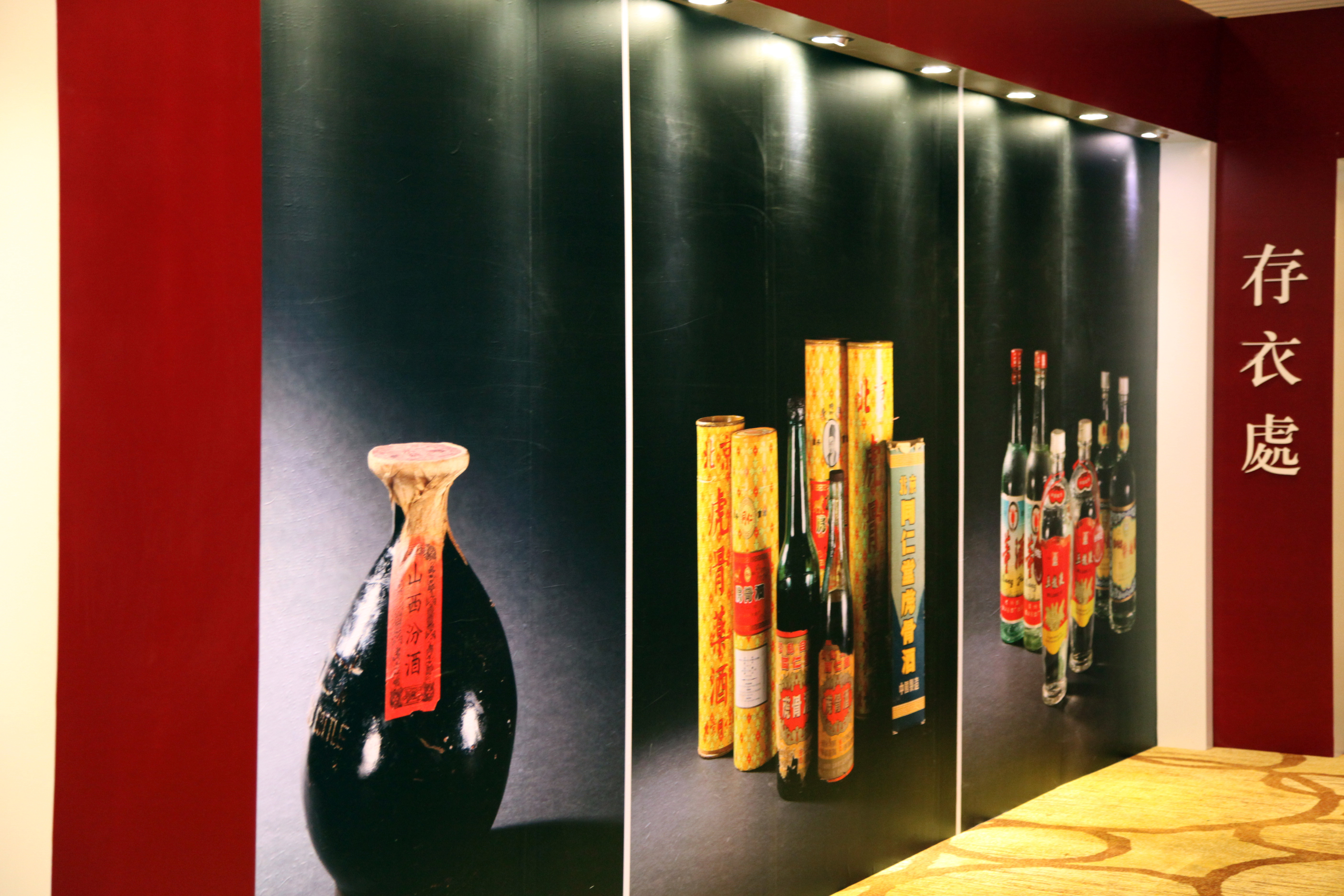

== See also ==
- Alcoholic drinks in China
- Bokeo Province
- CITES
- Edna Molewa
- Shenyang zoo scandal
- Tiger hunting
- Traffic (conservation programme)
- Wildlife smuggling
