= National Defense Mobilization Law =

2010 Chinese law

National Defense Mobilization Law of the People's Republic of China

Standing Committee of the National People's Congress
- Passed by: Standing Committee of the National People's Congress
- Passed: 26 February 2010
- Signed by: President Hu Jintao
- Signed: 26 February 2010
- Commenced: 1 July 2010
- Status: In force

National Defense Mobilization Law
- Simplified Chinese: 中华人民共和国国防动员法
- Traditional Chinese: 中華人民共和國國防動員法
Transcriptions
Standard Mandarin
- Hanyu Pinyin: Zhōnghuá Rénmín Gònghéguó Guófáng Dòngyuán fǎ

The National Defense Mobilization Law of the People's Republic of China is a legislation concerning national defense mobilization in the country. It was adopted by the Standing Committee of the National People's Congress (NPC) on 26 February 2010 and went into effect on 1 July 2010. It was amended on 28 August 2026, which came into effect on 1 October 2026.

The law gives the NPC Standing Committee the power to put the national economy and civilians in China, including foreign assets, in war-time footing if "state sovereignty, unification, territorial integrity or security is threatened."

== Legislative history ==
The National Defense Mobilization Law was adopted on 26 February 2010, by the Standing Committee of the 11th National People's Congress and signed by President Hu Jintao on the same day. It came into effect on 1 July 2010.

On 23 October 2021, the Standing Committee of the 13th National People's Congress adopted the "Decision on Temporarily Adjusting the Application of Relevant Legal Provisions During the Deepening of the Reform of the National Defense Mobilization System", which stated that during the deepening of the reform of the national defense mobilization system, the provisions of this law concerning the leadership and management system, military and local functions, establishment of working institutions, and command and use of national defense mobilization resources related to national defense mobilization, people's armed forces mobilization, economic mobilization, civil air defense, transportation preparedness, and national defense education would be temporarily adjusted.

=== 2026 Revision ===
On 28 August 2026, the 24th session of the Standing Committee of the 14th National People's Congress adopted the decision to revise the National Defense Mobilization Law. President Xi Jinping signed Presidential Order No. 83 promulgating the revision, which took effect on 1 October 2026. In this revision, Chapter III has been changed to: National Defense Mobilization Planning, Implementation Plans, and Potential Statistical Surveys; Chapter V has been changed to: Reserve of Reserve Personnel and Call-up; and Chapter X has been changed to: Requisition, Expropriation, and Compensation of Civilian Resources. The revisions update the law following the institutional reforms of the People's Liberation Army and the national defense mobilization system under the leadership of Xi Jinping, including removing references to military regions, which were replaced by theater commands in 2016.

== Provisions ==
The National Defense Mobilization Law of the People's Republic of China consists of 14 chapters and 82 articles, namely: General Provisions, Organizational Structure and Powers, National Defense Mobilization Planning, Implementation Plan and Potential Statistical Survey, Construction Projects and Important Products Closely Related to National Defense, Reserve and Conscription of Reserve Personnel, Reserve and Transportation of Strategic Materials, Military Product Research, Production and Maintenance Support, Prevention and Relief of War Disasters, National Defense Services, Requisition, Requisition and Compensation of Civilian Resources, Publicity and Education, Special Measures, Legal Liability, and Supplementary Provisions.

The National Defense Mobilization Law defines national defense mobilization as: "Activities in which the state, in accordance with the law, takes necessary measures to ensure a rapid transition between peacetime and wartime, and to transform economic and social strength into national defense strength in order to respond to threats to the state's sovereignty, unity, territorial integrity, security and development interests." Article 3 of the law states that national defense mobilization work adheres to the Xi Jinping Thought on Strengthening the Military and the leadership of the Chinese Communist Party.

== See also ==
- Mobilization
