= 2010 Xinfa aluminum plant protest =

Environmental protest in Guangxi, China

The 2010 Xinfa aluminum plant protest (信发铝厂污染引抗议) occurred when the Chiping County, Shandong Xinfa aluminum & power group (山东信发铝电集团) began when villagers started complaining about pollution created by the factory. A protest broke out in one of the village in Guangxi, People's Republic of China.

== Protest ==
According to an officer with the publicity department of the Chiping county government villagers have been unhappy for a long time due to the plant's aluminum pollution. Particularly the Zhuang people have complained. The event initially started on July 11, 2010.

More than 1,000 villagers marched on the streets in Jingxi County of Guangxi Zhuang autonomous region. On July 13, almost all the residents in Lingwan village were involved in blocking the road to Jingxi county. Some villagers threw stones at the police. One government official was hit by stones and sent to the hospital. They also obstructed the plant gate and damaged some production facilities. After the clash 3 people were killed, 18 were wounded. About 1000 police officers were on the scene to control the situation.
