= Zhang Yalin =

Chinese footballer

Zhang Yalin 张亚林
Personal information
- Full name: Zhang Yalin
- Date of birth: 19 April 1981
- Place of birth: Dalian, Liaoning, China
- Date of death: 14 February 2010 (aged 28)
- Place of death: Dalian, Liaoning, China
- Height: 1.88 m (6 ft 2 in)
- Position: Midfielder

Youth career
- 1990–1997: Dalian Wanda FC
- 1997–1999: Dalian Yiteng

Senior career*
Years	Team	Apps	(Gls)
2000–2009	Dalian Shide F.C.	103	(1)

International career
2003–2004	China U-23		
- * Club domestic league appearances and goals

Zhang Yalin (simplified Chinese: 张亚林; traditional Chinese: 張亞林; pinyin: Zhāng Yàlín; 19 April 1981 – 14 February 2010) was a Chinese football midfielder.

== Biography ==
Zhang Yalin started his football career in the 2000 Chinese league season for Dalian Shide F.C. and would quickly establish himself within the team that won the league title. From then on he would become a vital member of the team and by 2003 he was selected to the China national under-23 football team but was injured in training, which ruled him out from any tournament. By 2006 in his personal life he married Jia Nini (贾妮妮), a Chinese model and actress. They named their daughter, who was born 12 July 2007, Zhang Shijia (张诗伽).

On 14 February 2010, Zhang died of lymphoma in Dalian, aged 28, after two years with the disease.

Since his death, his shirt number of 26 has been retired in his honour by Dalian Shide.

== Honours ==
=== Club ===
Chinese Super League

- Winners (1): 2005

Chinese Jia-A League

- Winners (3): 2000, 2001, 2002

Chinese Super Cup

- Winners (2): 2000, 2002

Chinese FA Cup

- Winners (2): 2001, 2005

Asian Cup Winners' Cup

- Runners-up (1): 2001
