= Changsha IRD Building bombing =

2010 bombing in China

- Location: Changsha, Hunan, China
- Date: 30 July 2010; 16:15 (UTC+8)
- Attack type: Bombings
- Weapon: Bombs
- Deaths: 4
- Injuries: 19
- Perpetrator: Liu Zhuiheng

The Changsha IRD Building bombing (Chinese language: 長沙稅務分局大樓爆炸事件) occurred on 30 July 2010 at about 4:15 pm, and resulted in four deaths and 19 injuries. The site of the blasts was the third floor of the Dongtundu (東屯渡) Inland Revenue Department Branch Building in Furong District, Changsha, Hunan, China.

Police announced that the explosion was deliberate. The bomb exploded under a conference table, and killed two people and seriously injured ten others on the spot; two among the wounded died after being taken to the hospital.

On 30 December 2010, 52-year-old Liu Zhuiheng (刘赘衡) was convicted and sentenced to death by the Changsha Intermediate People's Court, and was subsequently executed on 29 December 2011. Two accomplices received sentences of seven years' imprisonment.
