= 314 Taipei protest =

2010 protest in Taipei, Taiwan

The 314 Taipei protest (Chinese: 314台北大遊行; pinyin: 314 Táiběi Dà Yóuxíng) was a protest that took place in Taipei, Taiwan, on 14 March 2010 for the 51st anniversary of the 1959 Tibetan uprising on 10 March 1959. The date also coincides with the 2008 Tibetan unrest, which took place on 14 March 2008. The event was organized by the Taiwan Friends of Tibet (TFOT).

== Taiwan protest ==
More than 1,000 people participated in the event. According to TFOT vice-chairman Yiong Cong-ziin (楊長鎮), he said “Tibetans believed the Chinese and believed in the 17-point agreement they signed with China in the 1950s, but the Chinese broke their promises and imposed harsh measures on freedom and religion in Tibet.”

The crowd departed from Zhongxiao Fuxing MRT station in Taipei and marched to Taipei 101.

== Hong Kong candlelight vigil ==
About 20 people held a candlelight vigil at the liaison office in Hong Kong. Several activists tried to hang a Tibetan snow lion flag at the office gate. A scuffle broke out between the activists and police officers.

== See also ==
- International Tibet Independence Movement
