= 2010 Nanjing chemical plant explosion =

Industrial incident in Nanjing, China

Coordinates: 32°06′52″N 118°49′20″E

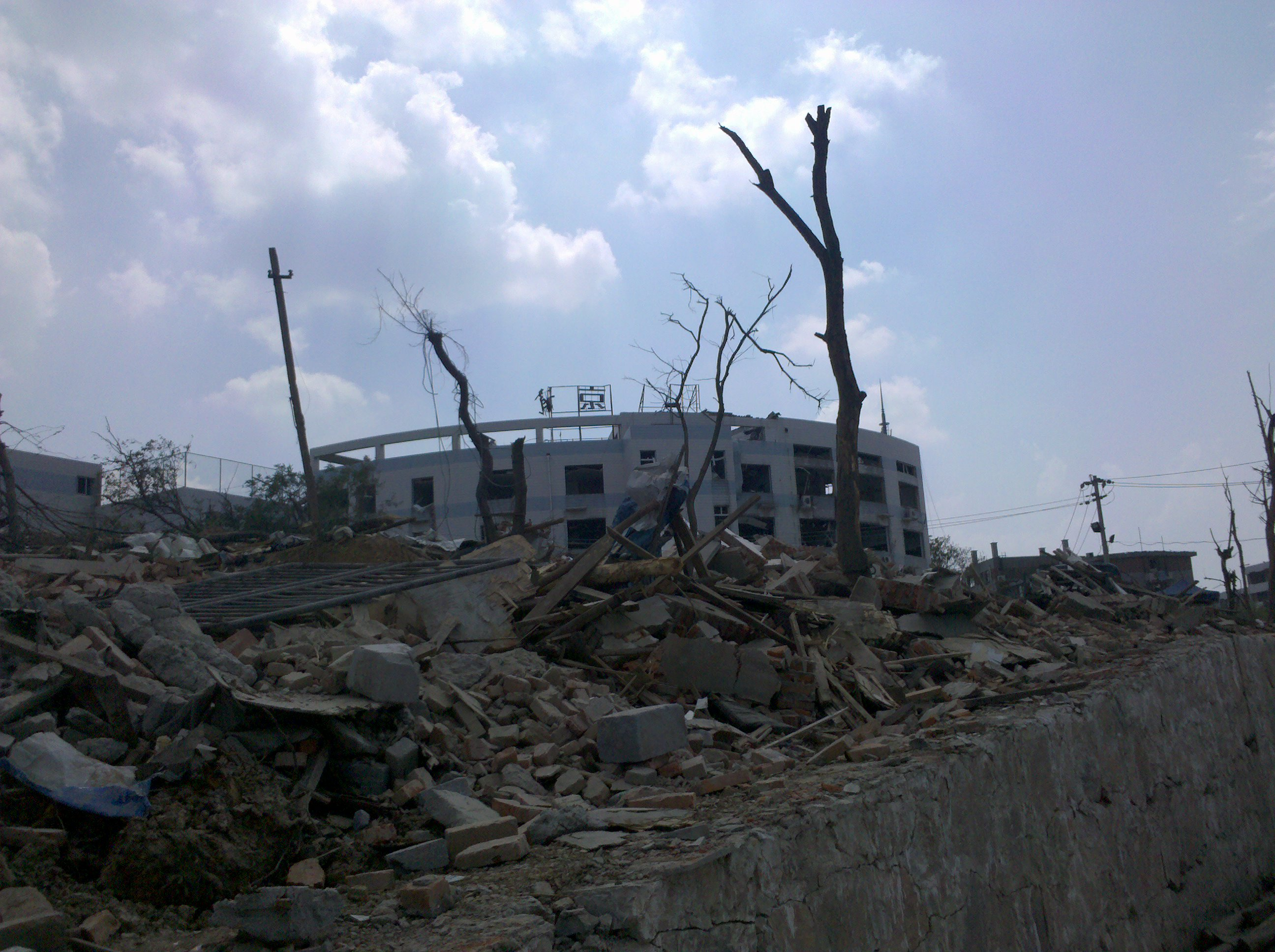
- Damage to the buildings after the explosion
- Location: Nanjing No.4 Plastics factory (abandoned); Qixia District, Nanjing, Jiangsu, China
- Date: July 28, 2010; 10:11 a.m. (UTC+8)
- Deaths: at least 13
- Injuries: 300+

The 2010 Nanjing chemical plant explosion occurred on July 28, 2010, in Qixia District, Nanjing, Jiangsu province, People's Republic of China.

== Explosion ==
The explosion happened at 10:15 am in the abandoned Nanjing No.4 Plastics factory. Most buildings within a 100-metre radius were flattened by the blast, according to China National Radio. According to official news, at least 13 people were killed with as many as 300 people injured. However, eyewitness accounts suggested the total number of deaths was much higher.

== Aftermath ==
A preliminary investigation suggested that the explosion was caused by the rupture of a propylene pipeline.
