= List of Chinese films of the 2010s =

This is a list of films produced in China ordered by year of expected release in the 2010s. For an alphabetical listing of Chinese films see Category:Chinese films

== 2010 ==
- List of Chinese films of 2010

== 2011 ==
- List of Chinese films of 2011

== 2012 ==
- List of Chinese films of 2012

== 2013 ==
- List of Chinese films of 2013

== 2014 ==
- List of Chinese films of 2014

== 2015 ==
- List of Chinese films of 2015

== 2016 ==
- List of Chinese films of 2016

== 2017 ==
- List of Chinese films of 2017

== 2018 ==
- List of Chinese films of 2018

== 2019 ==
- List of Chinese films of 2019
