= Charm Communications =

Chinese television advertising company

Charm Communications Inc.
- Company type: Public
- Traded as: Nasdaq: CHRM
- Industry: Advertising
- Founded: 2008
- Defunct: 2014
- Fate: Unknown
- Headquarters: Beijing, the People's Republic of China
- Revenue: $168.75 million (As of 2013)
- Website: www.charmgroup.com

Charm Communications Inc. (Nasdaq: CHRM) was the largest domestic television advertising company in China. It was incorporated in 2008 and is headquartered in Beijing. The company provides advertising agency services from planning and managing advertising campaigns. The company was listed as a public traded company in NASDAQ in 2010 and delisted in 2014.

== Background ==
The company's television advertising media resources include its exclusive arrangement with four programs on CCTV, two satellite television channels, Shanghai, China Dragon TV and Tianjin, China Satellite TV, etc. It also has an agreement with Beijing Gehua Cable Network to operate digital media advertising on its interactive high definition television (HDTV) digital cable platform. The company operates its business through three segments including Media Investment Management, Advertising Agency, and Branding and Identity Services. The targeted market is still positioned domestically with nine top clients who accounted for 18.1% ratio of the total revenue of the company in 2009. They are China Telecom, PICC, Agricultural Bank of China, China CITIC Bank, Snowbeer, Yunnan Baiyao, C-Bons, Wahaha Joint Venture Company and Midea. In 2012, the company was named as CCTV's Top Advertising Agency for ninth consecutive year.
