= 2010 Dawu Fire =

2010 wildfire in Sichuan, China

The 2010 Dawu Fire was a wildgrass fire incident that occurred in Dawu County, Sichuan, People's Republic of China on December 5, 2010. The fire incident killed 22 people including 15 soldiers and two government workers. More than 2,000 people fought to put out the fire. The fire lasted 17 hours and 30 minutes. The incident occurred on extreme terrain. The situation was dangerous with strong fire, strong wind and smoke in the grassland. The fire rescue equipment could not be reached. Netizens even described this combination of difficult situation and circumstance as "Heaven's natural order in the right place" (天时地利).
