= Handheld Culture =

Chinese online bookstore

Handheld Culture, Ltd.
- Company type: Private company
- Founded: 2010
- Headquarters: Hong Kong and Beijing, China
- Founders: Bonnie Chan, Howard Kwong
- Industry: Electronic commerce

Handheld Culture, Ltd. (“Handheld”, 首尚文化有限公司) is a Chinese online bookstore. It uses cloud technology, mobile app development and web integration. Called by The Wall Street Journal Asia as "the world's Chinese e-bookstore", Handheld is one of the largest online e-bookstores in Hong Kong.
