= Dewatering =

Removal of water from solid material or soil

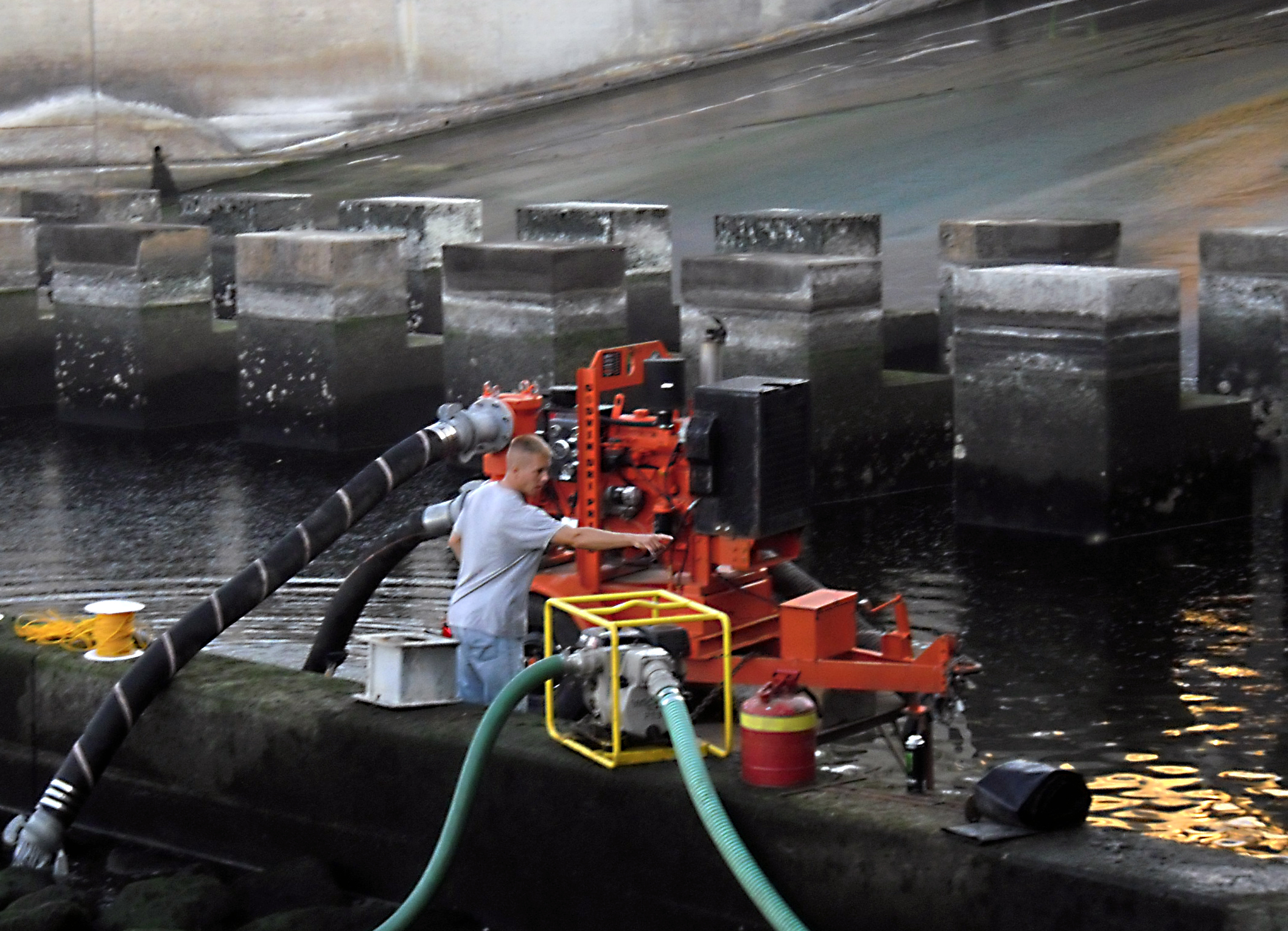
Pumps being used to dewater a spillway at Baldhill Dam

Dewatering /diːˈwɔːtərɪŋ/ is the removal of water from a location. This may be done by wet classification, centrifugation, filtration, or similar solid-liquid separation processes, such as removal of residual liquid from a filter cake by a filter press as part of various industrial processes.

Construction dewatering, unwatering, or water control are common terms used to describe removal or draining groundwater or surface water from a riverbed, construction site, caisson, or mine shaft, by pumping or evaporation. On a construction site, this dewatering may be implemented before subsurface excavation for foundations, shoring, or cellar space to lower the water table. This frequently involves the use of submersible "dewatering" pumps, centrifugal ("trash") pumps, eductors, or application of vacuum to well points. The international business research company Visiongain valued the global dewatering pump market at $6.4 billion in 2018.

== Processes ==
=== Deep wells ===
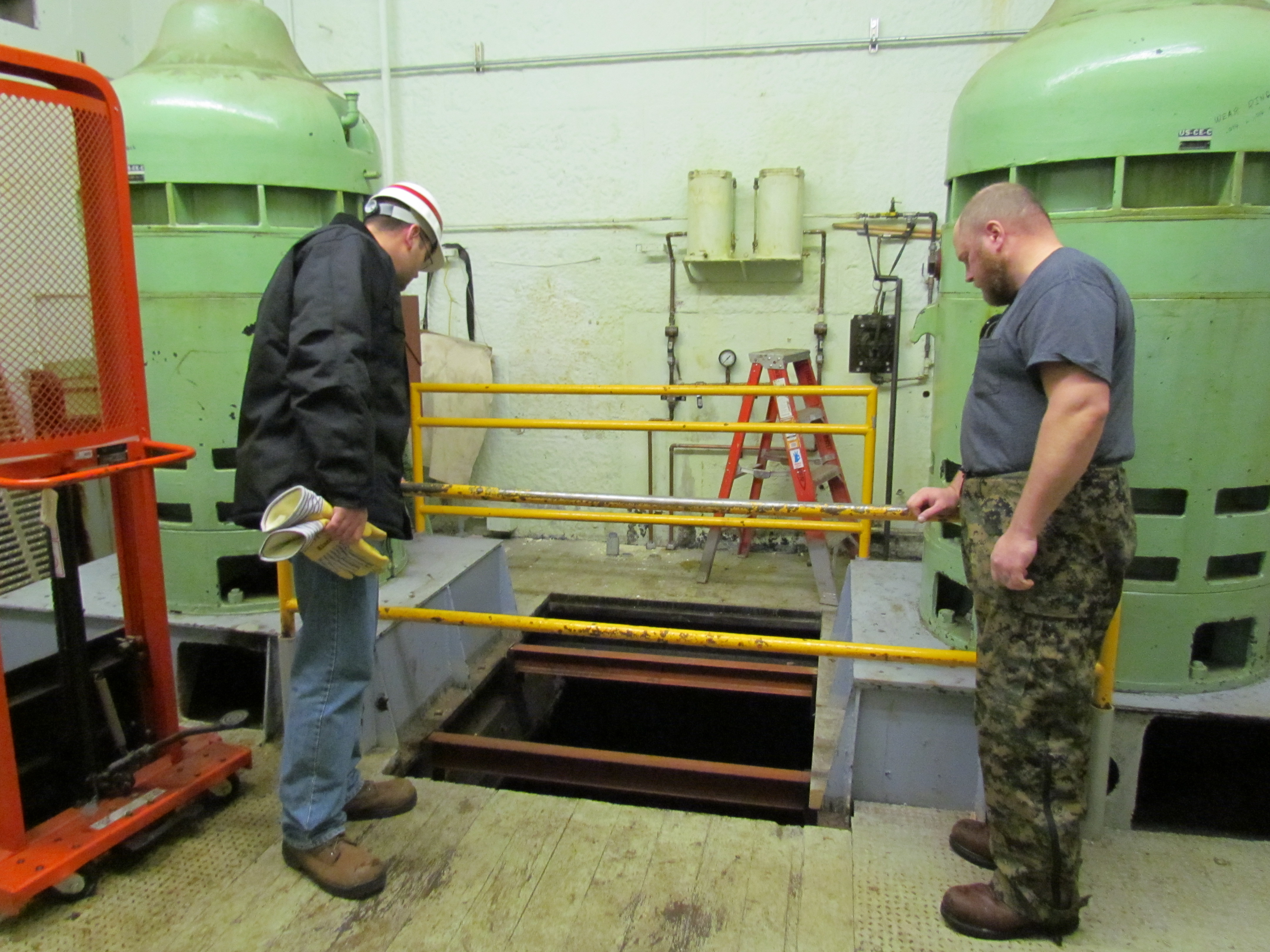
A deep well used to dewater locks at Sault Ste. Marie, Michigan

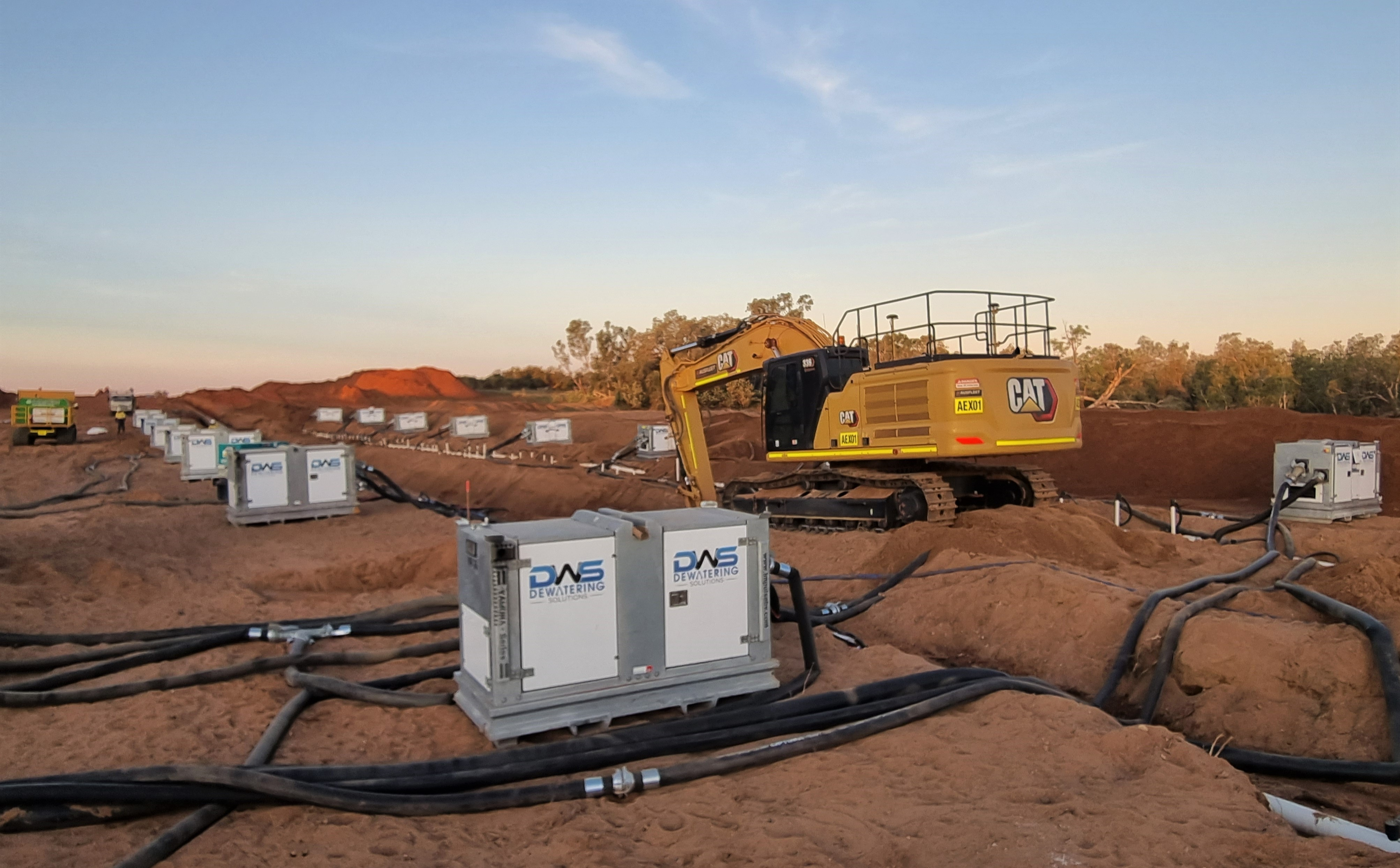
River crossing dewatering in Mine site

A deep well typically consists of a borehole fitted with a slotted liner and an electric submersible pump. As water is pumped from a deep well, a hydraulic gradient is formed and water flows into the well forming a cone of depression around the well in which there is little or no water remaining in the pore spaces of the surrounding soil. Deep wells work best in soils with a permeability of k = 10^{−3} m/s to 10^{−5} m/s; the amount of drawdown that a well can achieve is limited only by the size of the fish pump.

Deep wells can be installed in a ring around an excavation to lower the water level and maintain a safe, dry site. Several equations can be used to design deep well dewatering systems, however many of these are based on empirical data and occasionally fail. Practice and experience, along with a firm understanding of the underlying principles of dewatering, are the best tools for designing a successful system. Some dewatering situations "are so common that they can be designed almost by rule of thumb".

Deep wells are also used for aquifer testing and for groundwater drainage by wells.

=== Wellpoints ===
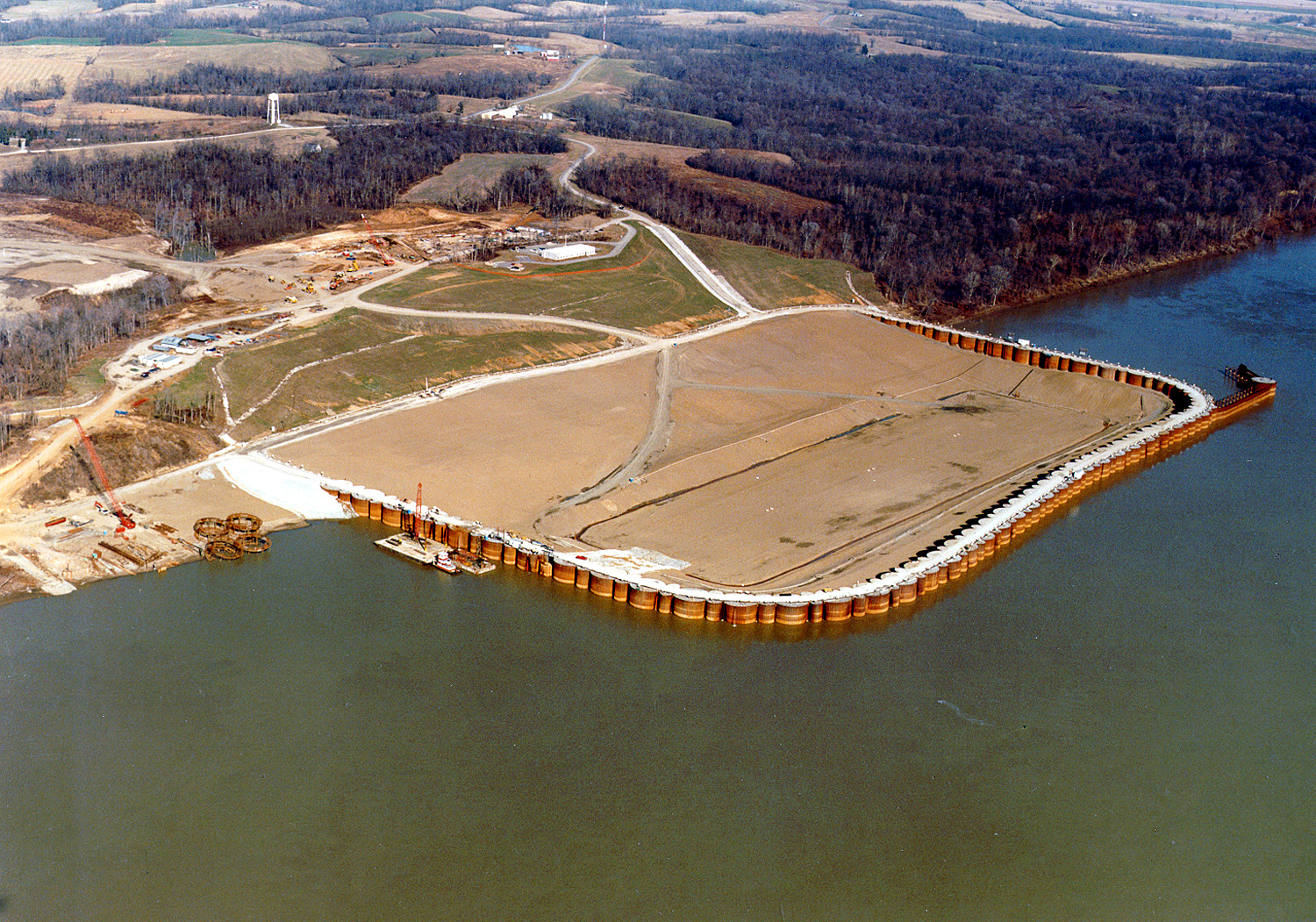
A cofferdam created to allow for dewatering of an area

Wellpoints are small-diameter (about 50 mm) tubes with slots near the bottom that are inserted into the ground from which water is drawn by a vacuum generated by a dewatering piston pump. Wellpoints are typically installed at close centers in a line along or around the edge of an excavation. As a vacuum is limited to 0 bar, the height to which water can be drawn is limited to about 6 meters (in practice). Wellpoints can be installed in stages, with the first reducing the water level by up to five meters, and a second stage, installed at a lower level, lowering it further. The water trickling between the deep wells may be collected by a single row of well point at the toe. This method ensures a much thicker width free from seepage forces.

Wellpoint spears are generally used to draw out groundwater in sandy soil conditions and rocky conditions and are not as effective in clay. Open pumps are sometimes used instead of spears if the ground conditions contain significant clay.

=== Horizontal drainage ===
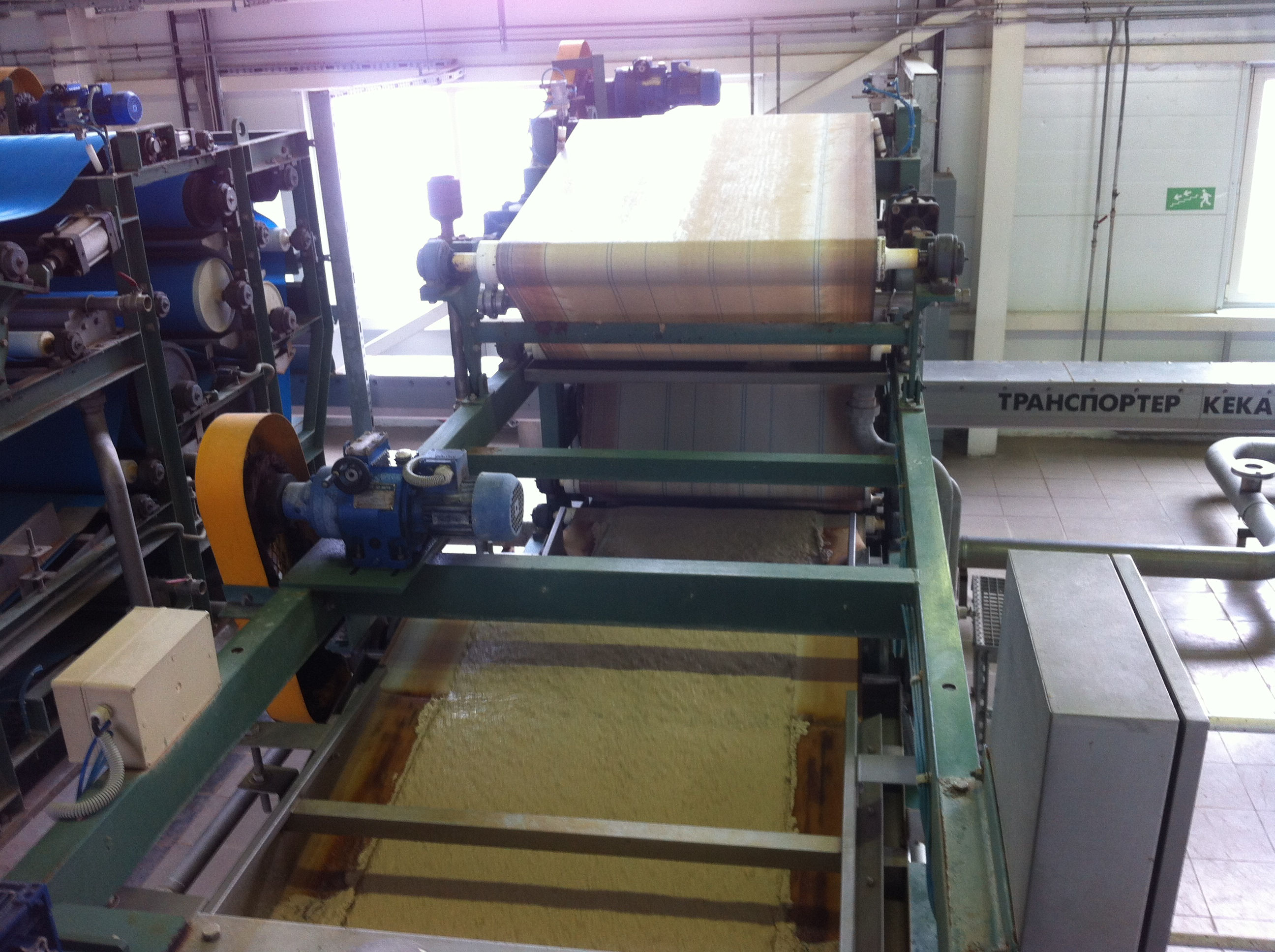
Dewatering of sludge in a wastewater treatment plant

The installation of horizontal dewatering systems is relatively easy. A trencher installs an unperforated pipe followed by a synthetic or organic wrapped perforated pipe. The drain length is determined by the drain diameter, soilconditions and the water table. In general drain lengths of 50 meters is common. After installation of the drainpipe a pump is connected to the drain. After the water table has been lowered, the intended construction can start. After the construction is finished the pumps are stopped, and the water table will rise again. Installation depths up to 6 meters are common.

== Control of pore pressures ==
Whilst engineers can use dewatering to lower a groundwater table, or to drain soils, they can also use the process to control pore pressure in soils and avoid damage to structures by base heave. High pore pressures occur in soils composed of fine silts or clays. Since these soils have a very low permeability, dewatering in a traditional sense (gravity flow into an abstraction well) may prove very costly or even futile. Instead, a vacuum-assisted dewatering scheme, such as ejector wells, or vacuum-sealed deep wells may serve to draw water into a well for abstraction.

== Applications ==
=== Construction ===
Dewatering is often a critical component of construction projects. Dewatering of a site improves safety by preventing the formation of mud and eliminating hazards to electrical equipment posed by water. Removing water also improves the stability of soils and mitigates erosion.

=== Wastewater treatment ===
In wastewater treatment, dewatering may be used to remove solids during the treatment process for separate disposal. This may take the form of thickening, where only some of the water is removed, or full dewatering.

== See also ==
- Geotechnical engineering
- Watertable control
- Mine dewatering
