= Yihuang self-immolation incident =

2010 protest event in Fuzhou, Jiangxi, China

The Yihuang self-immolation incident (宜黄自焚事件) occurred on 10 September 2010 in Yihuang County, Fuzhou, Jiangxi, China. Government authorities with demolition workers came to the home of the Zhong family. Ye Zhongcheng (叶忠诚) and two family members climbed to the roof and burnt themselves in protest. Ye died later.

== History ==
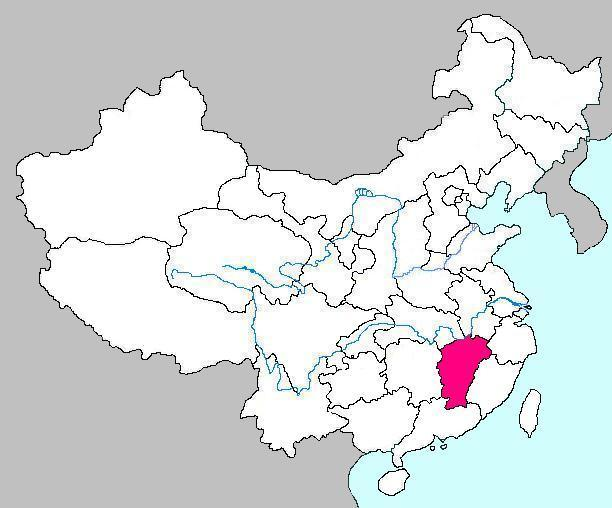
Jiangxi province in China

Yihaung county in Jiangxi province

The Zhong family lived in a three-story house. Several of the family were at home at the time of the incident. They included Luo Zhifeng 罗志凤 and her husband; his brother, Ye Zhongcheng 叶忠诚 and the couple's six children, Zhong Ruman 钟如满, Zhong Rucui 钟如翠, Zhong Rukui 钟如奎, Zhong Ruqin 钟如琴, Zhong Rujiu 钟如九 and Zhong Rutian 钟如田 (who was not at home). The house was held under three licenses belonging to the three brothers, Zhong Rukui, Zhong Rutian and Zhong Ruman.

The father had a chronic lung disease diagnosed in 2007 and used a medical ventilator. On 18 April 2010, the family's electricity was cut off and so they purchased a petrol powered generator.

In 2007, the home of the Zhongs and those of 21 neighbours were to be resumed for the building of a new bus station. The Zhong's refused to accept compensation. The Yihuang Investment and Development Company gave the Zhongs two options: monetary compensation or another house some sixty meters away. It was claimed the Zhongs refused both options and responded with demands to rebuild on site, exchange the site of their home for 480 m^{2} land in four parcels or three million yuan in compensation. This they denied.

At about 9am on 10 September 2010, over 40 police and workers from the Chengguan City Urban Administrative and Law Enforcement Bureau and government officials arrived at the Zhongs' house. They said they needed to enter the house to check the gasoline supply. When Zhong Rucui asked for a search warrant, the officials said they didn't need one as it was a potential emergency. The Zhongs locked their door. Several minutes later, the police broke the door down and entered the building. Ye Zhingcheng and two others went to the roof and burnt themselves with gasoline.

== See also ==
- Tang Fu-zhen self-immolation incident (2009)
