= 2010 Suzhou workers riot =

Labor dispute in Suzhou, Jiangsu, China

2010 Suzhou workers riot (Chinese: 苏州联建事件) occurred on January 15, 2010, in Suzhou, People's Republic of China. Workers were dissatisfied with the company's treatment of its employees and with compensation problems.

== Background ==
The event took place at the Taiwan-owned "United Win Technology" company (联建科技) located at the Suzhou Industrial Park. The company was built in 1999 as a mainland branch of the Taiwan company Wintek (胜华科技股份有限公司). The company manufactures screens for devices for Apple Inc., Nokia, Motorola and many other companies. Apple iPhone screens are an important part of the business.

== Incident ==
For a long time, the company has been suffering from poor staff management, bonus compensation problems and poor catering services. In 2008, the company-wide bonuses were canceled due to the economic downturn. In 2009, a factory employee provided information to a reporter about being poisoned on the job. The company switched from the regularly used alcohol to a more toxic and dangerous ethane solvent. In September 2009, some employees came in contact with the chemicals.

Also, according to a report of the 83 suppliers in China, 45 did not pay overtime costs to their employees. Another 23 suppliers were paying below the minimum wage.

On January 15, 2009, at 8:45 to 9 am, about 2000 factory workers gathered at the company and began destroying the factory properties. The workers also blocked a road and threw stones at the police.
