= 2010 Ma'anshan riot =

Riot in China

The 2010 Ma'anshan riot (马鞍山局长打人事件) or the June 11 incident (6.11 事件) occurred in Anhui Province, Ma'anshan, Huashan District in the People's Republic of China on June 11, 2010. It started out when a Chinese Communist Party official hit a boy with his car followed by a number of angry responses. The city then rioted over the official's action.

== Incident ==
At 6:40 pm on June 11, Communist Party Ma'anshan tourism official Wang Guo-qing ((汪国庆) was driving in a car with another female passenger down Hubei East Road (湖北东路) Darunfa Market ((大润发卖场). A young boy was hit lightly. Instead of apologizing, Wang got out of the car and attacked the boy. The female passenger also agreed and complimented the attack saying it was a "good hit". Wang was talking to the boy, "Do you know who I am? I am the government leader." This stirred anger amongst the crowd. The woman in the passenger side followed by saying she knew where the boy attended school judging by the uniform and that she had the authority to "mess him up".

== Riot ==
Pedestrians started attacking them with bricks on the street. This quickly led to 3,000 to 4,000 people following in the riot. At around 11:30 pm the city's CPC secretary Zheng Wei-wen ((郑为文) arrived on scene to handle the case and gave some visibility. He said if the case was not handled well, the citizens can find Zheng himself.

About 10 minutes later the armed riot-police-unit arrived on the scene. The crowd started throwing all types of objects in complete chaos. The police responded by firing tear gas. Afterward there were some reports that questioned whether Wang Guo-qing was drunk at the time.
