= Shenyang zoo scandal =

Animal welfare scandal in Shenyang, China

The Shenyang zoo scandal refers to a series of incidents in which The Shenyang Forest Wild Animal Zoo (沈阳动物园), a private zoo located in Shenyang, Liaoning, People's Republic of China, was accused of mistreating and starving a number of animals, many of which died of various causes between 2009 and 2010. In March of the same year, a large protest was held by employees of the zoo. The revelations of abuse at the institution shocked animal conservationists around the world.

== History ==
The zoo was originally established in September 1998 as a privately owned enterprise. In 2003 a large number of employees quit the zoo. This was followed by a fatal tiger attack in 2004. In 2006 the zoo was shut down completely for 10 days due to economic problems. Additionally, the park is normally closed for six months each year due to the region's long winters.

== 2009 ==
Between November 2009 and February 2010 at least 11 Siberian tigers died of malnutrition. An average tiger must be fed roughly 20kg of beef each day, while the tigers involved had been fed only chicken bones for months.

On November 13, 2009, a man was attacked and injured by two hungry tigers, forcing the zoo to close for safety reasons.

== 2010 ==
The death toll as of March 2010 is 1 lion, 1 wolf, 1 raccoon dog, 1 macaque, 1 dalmatian dog, 1 yak, 2 camels, 1 przewalski's horse, 1 springbok, 2 ostriches, 1 red-crowned crane, 1 yellow crane, 1 emu. Also missing without an explanation are 1 brown bear, 1 macaque, 2 camels and 1 white stork.

About 20 other Siberian tigers are said to be on the verge of starvation.

On March 10, 2010, about 100 of the remaining workers staged a protest demanding unpaid wages of up to 18 months. More than 100 of the zoo's 260 employees have already quit. Some workers alleged that the zoo routinely used dead animals to make tiger bone wine (Chinese: 虎骨酒; pinyin: Hǔ gǔ jiǔ), but the allegation was denied by an investigator. Hua Ning, the China program manager for the International Fund for Animal Welfare, claims that the zoo's real purpose is the breeding of tigers and the commercial harvesting of their body parts, with conservation and research serving as a convenient cover.

The number of animals in the zoo has dropped by half in a decade, from 1,020 individuals representing 61 species in 2000 to 518 individuals representing only 49 species in 2010.

== Responses ==
The municipal government in northeastern China has allocated 7 million yuan (US$1 million) to improve conditions at the zoo. About 2 million yuan of the funds will be used to pay workers.

A senior employee at the zoo has claimed that the tigers were mistreated deliberately, in order to apply for emergency funds.

The Shenyang government has since taken control of the park and proposed measures to prevent any further deaths. They also plan to grant the media access to the zoo after some additional investigation.

== See also ==
- Animal protection law of the People's Republic of China
