= Andatee China Marine Fuel =

Chinese fuel company

Andatee China Marine Fuel Service Corporation
- Company type: Public
- Traded as: Nasdaq: AMCF
- Industry: Marine Fuel Wholesale and Retail
- Founded: 2009; 17 years ago
- Headquarters: Dalian, China
- Key people: An Fengbin
- Revenue: $279.89 million (As of 2013)
- Number of employees: 197
- Website: www.andatee.com

Andatee China Marine Fuel Service Corporation is a marine fuel wholesale and retail company that is based in Dalian, China. The company sells oil fuel products mainly to one municipality directly under the central government and four big provinces in the Northeast and East of China, namely Tianjin, Liaoning, Shandong, Jiangsu and Zhejiang. The company has subsidiaries including Goodwill Rich International Limited, Dalian Fusheng Petrochemical Company ("Fusheng"), Fusheng's variable interest entity, and Xing Yuan. The company's subsidiary, Xing Yuan, founded in 2001, is a joint-venture with the Dalian subsidiary of CPC Corp. (China Petroleum and Chemical Corporation), which is the largest petroleum company in China.

== Operations ==
The company is the largest private-owned marine-fuel provider in Northern China with about 25% market share of Bohai Bay. The marine fuel production and sales market in China is relatively fragmented and limited. The company is one of the companies that provides blended marine fuel products to ships and vessels in China and has a relatively influential brand in the customer market. On January 7, 2014, the company announced a series of executive management changes including a new chief executive officer, Wang Hao.

== History ==
The company was incorporated in July 2009 and one month later it acquired Goodwill Rich, a company in HongKong, as its wholly owned subsidiary. In March of the same year, Goodwill created a subsidiary named Fusheng Consulting Company in Dalian.

Xing Yuan, another subsidiary of the company, was founded in September 2001. In March 2009, the committee of the company reached an agreement that Goodwill Rich was entitled to the operations and benefits of Xing Yuan and its subsidiaries.

The company completed initial public offering on NASDAQ in January 2010.
