= Bashan 125R =

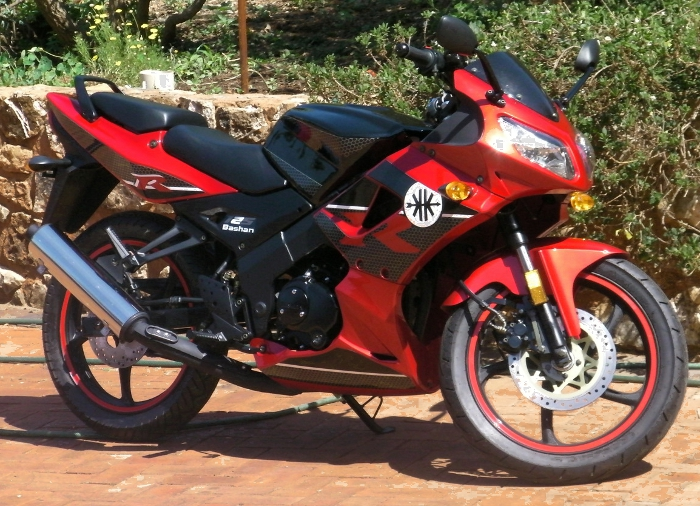
- A red Bashan 125R
- Manufacturer: Bashan Motorcycle Manufacturing Co. Ltd
- Also called: Jonway Bashan 125R (in South Africa)
- Production: 2010–present
- Class: Sport bike
- Engine: 124.6 cc (7.60 cu in) SOHC four-stroke 2-valve balance shaft
- Ignition type: Capacitor discharge ignition electronic ignition (CDI)
- Transmission: 5-speed manual transmission
- Frame type: Steel twin-spar diamond
- Suspension: Front: Inverted telescopic fork Rear: Monoshock swingarm
- Brakes: Disc (front and rear)
- Dimensions: L: 1.975 m (77.8 in); W: 0.690 m (27.2 in); H: 1.100 m (43.3 in)
- Weight: 121 kg (267 lb) (dry)
- Fuel capacity: 11 L (2.4 imp gal; 2.9 US gal)

The Bashan 125R is a 125-cubic-centimetre (7.6 cu in) four-stroke sport bike and commuter motorcycle manufactured by Bashan Motorcycle Manufacturing Co. Ltd in Chongqing, China. Chongqing is the third largest centre of motor vehicle production and the largest for motorcycles in China.

Using the same frame as the Honda CBR125R and CBR150, the Bashan 125R has interchangeable parts with its Honda counterparts, making it possible to mount aftermarket fairings and accessories from the CBR125/150.
