= Luotuoshan coal mine flood =

2010 mining incident in China

The Luotuoshan coal mine flood was an incident that began on Monday, March 1, 2010, when a large amount of water flooded the Luotuoshan coal mine near the city of Wuhai in the Inner Mongolia Autonomous Region of the People's Republic of China. A total of 77 workers were underground when they broke into a large pool of Ordovician limestone water early in the morning. By Monday evening, 45 were rescued and one was confirmed dead. All rescue operations were stopped after 14 days, when medical teams believed that the 31 trapped coal miners had no chance of survival.

The rescue work was the largest coal mine mobilization in China's history with 40 professional rescue teams involved, comprising 20,384 people. Infrared surveillance cameras and echo megaphones were used to try to detect life underground, but were unsuccessful.

Workers continued pumping water out of the mine and attempting to stop the flooding after the rescue efforts were called off. 3,850 cubic meters of water were being pumped out every hour since the rescue efforts began, with around 100,000 cubic meters of water remaining in the mine on March 24. Yi Lan, a spokesperson for the rescue headquarters, said that workers were hoping to seal the mine pit with 50 million cubic meters of cement, rubble and water glass by April 4.

The construction of the mine, which was still underway at the time of the incident, began in 2006 with the goal of producing 1.5 million tons of coal per year. The mine is owned by Wuhai Energy Co. Ltd., a subsidiary of China's largest coal producer Shenhua Group Corp. Ltd.

== See also ==
- 2010 Wangjialing coal mine flood
