= Yan Xiaoling – Fan Yanqiong case =

Chinese criminal case

The Yan Xiaoling – Fan Yanqiong case (simplified Chinese: 严晓玲、范燕琼案件; traditional Chinese: 嚴曉玲、范燕瓊案件), also known as the Fujian Netizen Case (simplified Chinese: 福建网民案; traditional Chinese: 福建網民案), occurred from June 2009 through April 2010 in Fuzhou, Fujian Province, People's Republic of China. Yan Xiaoling (严晓玲), a 25-year-old woman from Minqing County, was found dead in February 2008 and was believed by her mother Lin Xiuying (林秀英) to be murdered after being gang raped by a group of ruffians who had connection with the local police, while the officials insisted that she had died from an ectopic pregnancy. Three human rights activists in Fuzhou, Fan Yanqiong (范燕琼), You Jingyou (游精佑) and Wu Huaying (吴华英), offered assistance by interviewing Yan's mother and putting the filmed footage online on June 24, 2009, but were soon, among several other netizens, arrested by Fuzhou police and thrown into custody. The three were charged with, but never legally convicted of, making false and malicious accusation and had been detained for nine months before the final verdict was announced on April 16, 2010 without any public trial. The case ended with Fan Yanqiong being sentenced to two years in jail and You Jingyou and Wu Huaying to one year. Fujian authorities later asked for the release of the suspects and an appeal was filed, but it was dismissed in court and the original verdict was upheld.
