= Xiangning County =

Coordinates: 35°58′13″N 110°50′49″E

Xiangning County 乡宁县 Siangning
- County
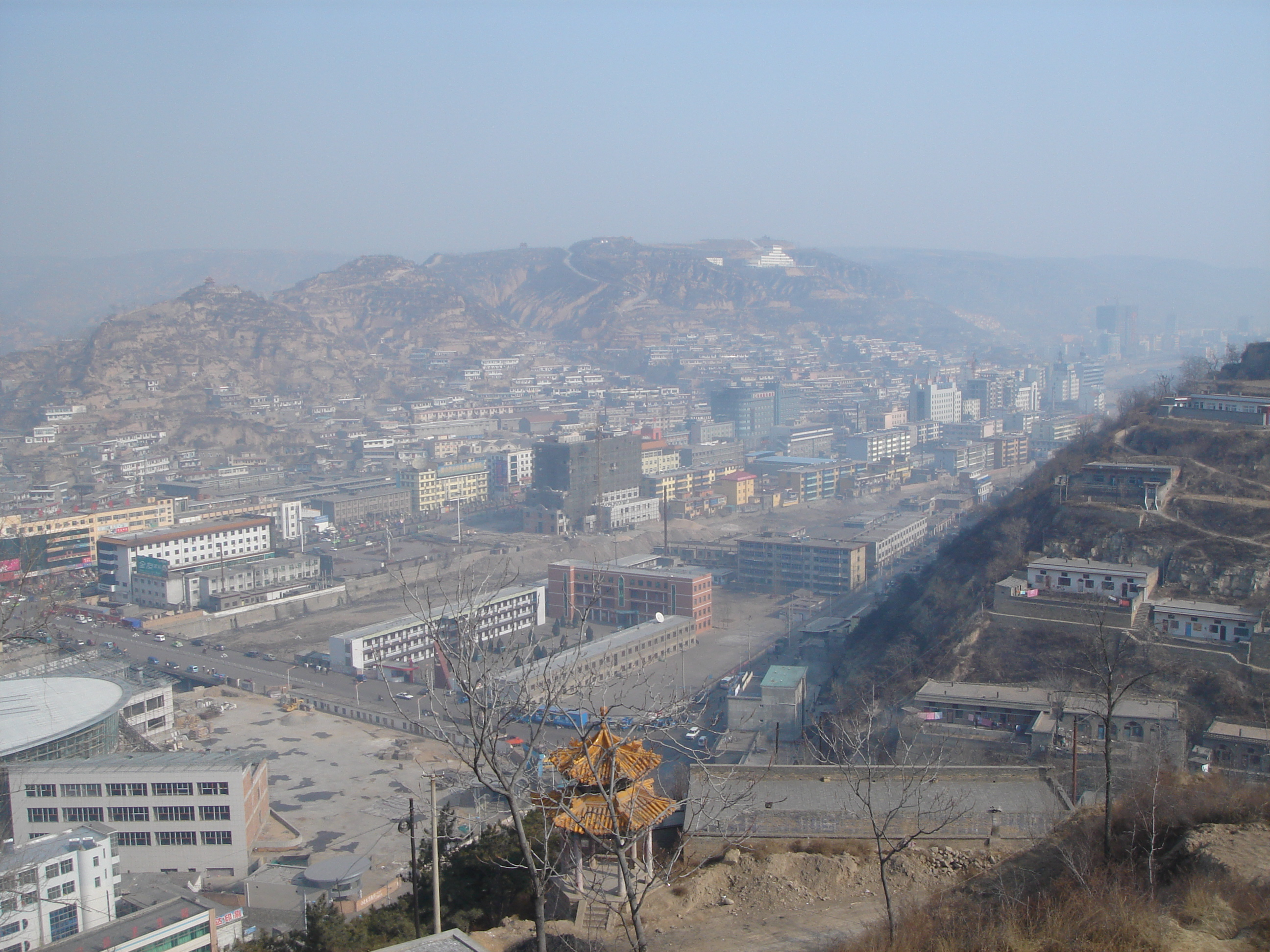

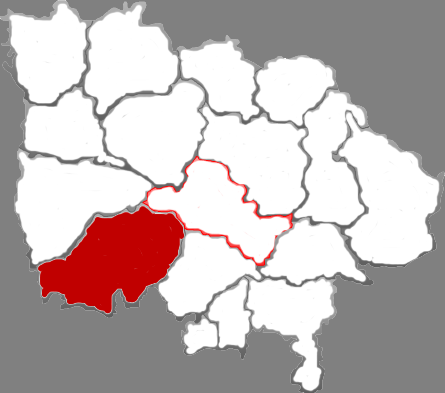
- Country: People's Republic of China
- Province: Shanxi
- Prefecture-level city: Linfen

Area
  - Total: 2,029 km^{2} (783 sq mi)

Population (2013)
  - Total: 240,000
  - Density: 120/km^{2} (310/sq mi)
- Time zone: UTC+8 (China Standard)
- Website: xiangning.gov.cn

Xiangning County (simplified Chinese: 乡宁县; traditional Chinese: 鄉寧縣; pinyin: Xiāngníng Xiàn; lit. 'countryside peace') is a county in the southwest of Shanxi province, China, bordering Shaanxi province across the Yellow River to the west. It is under the administration of the prefecture-level city of Linfen. The county spans an area of 2,029 square kilometres (783 mi^{2}), and is home to a population of 240,000 people as of 2013.

== History ==
During the Spring and Autumn period, Marquis E of Jin lived in what is now present-day Xiangning County.

In the Warring States period, the area had been occupied by both the Han and Zhao states.

During the Northern Wei Dynasty, the area was initially named Changping (Chinese: 昌平), and was later changed to Pingchang (Chinese: 平昌). Eventually, the name was changed to Changning (simplified Chinese: 昌宁; traditional Chinese: 昌寧), but in 923 was changed to Xiangning (simplified Chinese: 乡宁; traditional Chinese: 鄉寧), its present-day name.

From 1958 to 1961, Xiangning County was briefly merged with neighboring Ji County.

== Geography ==
The county is located in the Lüliang Mountains of the Loess Plateau, and has a largely hilly terrain with an average elevation of about 900 metres (3,000 ft). The county's highest point is Gaotian Mountain (Chinese: 高天山), which reaches 1,820.5 metres (5,973 ft) in altitude; the county's lowest point is along the banks of the Yellow River, at 385.1 metres (1,263 ft) in altitude.

38.2% of the county is forested.

== Climate ==
Climate data for Xiangning, elevation 965 m (3,166 ft), (1991–2020 normals, extremes 1981–present)
Month	Jan	Feb	Mar	Apr	May	Jun	Jul	Aug	Sep	Oct	Nov	Dec	Year
Record high °C (°F)	18.4 (65.1)	23.3 (73.9)	28.2 (82.8)	35.2 (95.4)	36.2 (97.2)	37.4 (99.3)	37.7 (99.9)	36.5 (97.7)	36.1 (97.0)	29.1 (84.4)	26.7 (80.1)	18.2 (64.8)	37.7 (99.9)
Mean daily maximum °C (°F)	3.2 (37.8)	7.1 (44.8)	13.0 (55.4)	20.1 (68.2)	24.6 (76.3)	28.7 (83.7)	29.7 (85.5)	27.9 (82.2)	23.5 (74.3)	18.0 (64.4)	11.3 (52.3)	4.9 (40.8)	17.7 (63.8)
Daily mean °C (°F)	−4.1 (24.6)	−0.1 (31.8)	5.7 (42.3)	12.7 (54.9)	17.8 (64.0)	22.1 (71.8)	23.8 (74.8)	22.1 (71.8)	17.2 (63.0)	10.9 (51.6)	3.9 (39.0)	−2.2 (28.0)	10.8 (51.5)
Mean daily minimum °C (°F)	−9.1 (15.6)	−5.2 (22.6)	0.1 (32.2)	6.1 (43.0)	11.0 (51.8)	15.6 (60.1)	18.7 (65.7)	17.5 (63.5)	12.6 (54.7)	5.9 (42.6)	−0.9 (30.4)	−6.9 (19.6)	5.4 (41.8)
Record low °C (°F)	−20.4 (−4.7)	−19.0 (−2.2)	−15.5 (4.1)	−6.0 (21.2)	−0.2 (31.6)	6.1 (43.0)	11.6 (52.9)	8.8 (47.8)	1.3 (34.3)	−6.8 (19.8)	−16.4 (2.5)	−21.6 (−6.9)	−21.6 (−6.9)
Average precipitation mm (inches)	3.7 (0.15)	7.0 (0.28)	11.8 (0.46)	28.7 (1.13)	45.8 (1.80)	62.2 (2.45)	123.2 (4.85)	114.2 (4.50)	73.0 (2.87)	44.4 (1.75)	15.3 (0.60)	3.4 (0.13)	532.7 (20.97)
Average precipitation days (≥ 0.1 mm)	2.5	3.3	4.6	6.0	8.2	9.4	12.5	11.0	10.1	7.6	4.8	2.2	82.2
Average snowy days	4.2	4.7	2.8	0.4	0	0	0	0	0	0.3	2.4	3.8	18.6
Average relative humidity (%)	51	52	50	49	53	59	70	73	73	67	60	53	59
Mean monthly sunshine hours	182.1	168.3	193.0	221.2	234.6	222.6	204.4	191.6	174.8	183.0	175.5	180.6	2,331.7
Percentage possible sunshine	58	54	52	56	54	51	46	46	48	53	58	60	53
Source: China Meteorological Administration

== Administrative divisions ==
Xiangning County is divided into five towns and five townships. These are then divided into 182 village-level divisions.

The county's five towns are Changning, Guanghua, Taitou, Guantou, and Xibo.

The county's five townships are Shuanghe Township, Guanwangmiao Township, Weizhuang Township, Xijiaokou Township, and Zaoling Township.

== Economy ==
The county is home to a large coal field, which covers 1,600 square kilometres (620 mi^{2}) of the county's area. Said coal field is estimated to have 15.3 billion tons of coal in reserve.

Xiangning also has a number of tourist sights, such as the Xiangning Thousand Buddha Cave, Yunqiu Mountain (simplified Chinese: 云丘山; traditional Chinese: 雲丘山), and a number of temples and pagodas.

Major agricultural products from Xiangning include Zanthoxylum, apples, walnuts, Chinese yams, Elaeagnus mollis, and wine.

== Transportation ==
National Highway 209 and National Highway 309 both run through the county, as well as three provincial highways.
