= Dongxing Coal Mining Co fire =

2010 mining incident in Zhengzhou, China

The Dongxing Coal Mining Co. fire was an incident that began on Monday, March 15, 2010, in the main pit of Dongxing Coal Mining Co, Xinmi, Zhengzhou, People's Republic of China. Twenty-five miners died during the incident which, among other things, resulted in four local officials being removed from office.

The fire began at 8:30 p.m. on Monday when electrical cables in the main pit caught on fire. At the time, 31 workers were in the mine and six were saved in the rescue operation that ended at around 2:00 a.m. the following morning. The mine was being renovated to increase its annual output to 150,000 tons from 60,000.

Shuhe Wang, Deputy Director of the State Administration of Coal Mine Safety, said that mines that are being rebuilt were strictly forbidden from producing coal, but the Dongxing Coal Mining Co had ignored the ban and resumed production without a license. Wang blamed the incident on coal safety officials' lack of supervision.

The Xinmi government acted quickly to crack down on company officials and government officials who should have prevented the disaster: Yingxi Su, a vice-mayor of Xinmi, Ruihui Fan, governor of Niudian township, Xinxian Zhu, a township official in charge of work safety, and Guoqi Pei, a deputy director of the Xinmi Coal Mine Bureau, were removed from office; three work safety inspectors who were responsible for overseeing the mine were dismissed; and Mancang Fu of Dongxing Coal Mining Co along with three directors were placed under criminal detention. The personal accounts of Fu and the three company directors were frozen as were the company's accounts.

The dead miners were identified as migrants from Henan, Anhui and Sichuan provinces.
