= Yuanyang colliery outburst =

2010 mining disaster in Guizhou, China

The outburst occurred late Thursday in a mine in Puding County, Anshun, Guizhou province of China.

The Yuanyang colliery outburst occurred at the privately run Yuanyang colliery in Puding County, Anshun, Guizhou, People's Republic of China, at 9:40 p.m. on 13 May 2010. At least 21 people were killed and at least five were wounded.

Thirty-one miners were inside the shaft at the time of the outburst, and ten of them walked out alive. Rescuers searched in vain for others. There were genuine fears that an unknown quantity of unregistered miners may have been underground at the time. Half of the fleeing ten were still hospitalised and receiving treatment for carbon monoxide poisoning the following day. 24 miners were initially reported as being trapped, with seven escaping the mine.

An early investigation revealed explosives were responsible for the burst. The explosives were used for illegal mining which had been underway in the colliery. According to deputy director of the State Administration of Coal Mine Safety Wang Shuhe, "local authorities did not fully perform their duties, and occasionally even abetted or sheltered illegal activities". He visited the scene as part of the investigation. Work at all of Puding's collieries was suspended. Guizhou surveyed its coal mines for safety reasons on 15 May 2010. Guizhou's vice-governor Sun Guoqiang said authorities should have checked the mine and asked officials after the burst: "Did anyone of you visit the mine after approving the shaft maintenance project"?

The incident had severe consequences for county-level and township officials: five were suspended or fired altogether when the full extent of what had occurred was realised. Vice head of Puding, Wu Guohong: county director of work safety supervision administration, Xu Dongfeng: county director of coal mining administration, Hu Yingze, were among these. The mine's owner, Li Renjie, vanished without a trace as authorities attempted to find him.

== See also ==
- Coal power in China
