= Wangjialing coal mine flood =

2010 mining incident in Shanxi, China

- Simplified Chinese: 王家岭煤矿“3·28”透水事故
- Traditional Chinese: 王家嶺煤礦“3·28”透水事故
Transcriptions
Standard Mandarin
- Hanyu Pinyin: Wángjiālíng méikuàng sānèrbā tòushuǐ shìgù

The Wangjialing coal mine flood was an incident that began on Sunday, March 28, 2010, when underground water flooded parts of the Wangjialing coal mine in the Shanxi province of People's Republic of China. A total of 261 people were in the mine when workers first broke through an abandoned shaft that was filled with water. Over 100 managed to escape, but 153 workers were trapped in nine different platforms of the mine.

Television reports spoke of the survivors attaching themselves by belts to the wall of the mine as waters rushed in. They hung there for three days until a mine cart drifted by and they got in. Most workers are safe with a few dozen still trapped as of 5 April, if the official numbers are correct; families claim the actual number is higher.

The mine belongs to state-owned Huajin Coking Coal Co. Ltd. At the time, workers were building the mine's infrastructure to allow it to produce 6 million tons of coal per year at full production.

== Location ==
Wangjialing (王家嶺/王家岭) is in Shanxi province's south-west. More specifically, it sits on Mount Longmen. The mine is located between the town of Fancun (樊村镇) southeast of the mountain) and Xiahua Township (下化乡; northwest of the mountain) in Hejin City and Xipo (西坡镇; northeast of the mountain) in Xiangning County. Hejin and Xiangning are both in Shanxi province but belong to different prefecture-level cities: Hejin is in Yuncheng while Xiangning belongs to Linfen.

The mine is located near bridges that span the Yellow River between Shanxi and Shaanxi provinces.

== Rescue efforts ==
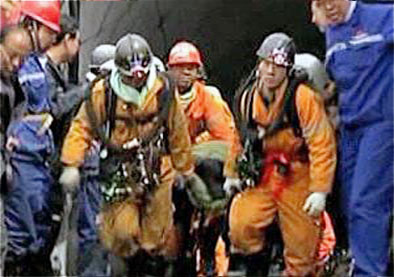
Workers carry a rescued miner to safety

More than 3,000 rescue workers are working to pump out the water, equivalent in volume to 55 Olympic swimming pools. Rescuers are facing black, murky water and a high concentration of toxic gas.

After a week of being trapped, 9 workers were rescued during the early morning hours of April 5, and sent to a hospital in Hejin. In the same day, a total of 115 trapped workers had been rescued and were quickly sent to hospitals; 26 of them were in a poor state of health. According to survivors, some ate paper and chewed on coal for hunger relief.

Until April 9 morning (local time), 23 victims have been confirmed dead. It is said that the remaining 15 trapped people had been located, but there are difficulties in approaching them. Rescuers said on April 8 that the chance of surviving for 14 workers in those 15 was "nearly zero" for they were quite near the point where the underground flood began to pour into the tunnel. However, the search for them is still ongoing.

== See also ==
- 2006 Nanshan Colliery disaster, a mine explosion in Shanxi
- 2008 Shanxi mudslide caused by the collapse of an unlicensed mine landfill
- 2009 Shanxi mine blast
- 2010 mine incident death toll list (Chinese)

== Additional source ==
- (in Yue Chinese)NOW TV - 災難救援可以做假,中國共產黨會唔會都係假?
