= List of minor planets: 448001–449000 =

The following is a partial list of minor planets, running from minor-planet number 448001 through 449000, inclusive. The primary data for this and other partial lists is based on JPL's "Small-Body Orbital Elements" and data available from the Minor Planet Center. Critical list information is also provided by the MPC, unless otherwise specified from Lowell Observatory. A detailed description of the table's columns and additional sources are given on the main page including a complete list of every page in this series, and a statistical break-up on the dynamical classification of minor planets.

Also see the summary list of all named bodies in numerical and alphabetical order, and the corresponding naming citations for the number range of this particular list. New namings may only be added to this list after official publication, as the preannouncement of names is condemned by the Working Group for Small Bodies Nomenclature of the International Astronomical Union.

Near-Earth obj.	MBA (inner)	MBA (outer)	Centaur
Mars-crosser	MBA (middle)	Jupiter trojan	Trans-Neptunian obj.
Unclassified

== 448001–448100 ==
Designation			Discovery			Properties		Ref
Permanent	Provisional	Named after	Date	Site	Discoverer(s)	Category	Diam.	Ref
448001	2008 CS_{207}	—	February 8, 2008	Kitt Peak	Spacewatch	HOF	2.5 km	MPC · JPL
448002	2008 CV_{213}	—	February 10, 2008	Mount Lemmon	Mount Lemmon Survey	·	1.6 km	MPC · JPL
448003	2008 DE	—	February 12, 2008	Catalina	CSS	AMO · APO · PHA	430 m	MPC · JPL
448004	2008 DR_{2}	—	February 24, 2008	Kitt Peak	Spacewatch	·	1.9 km	MPC · JPL
448005	2008 DH_{3}	—	February 24, 2008	Mount Lemmon	Mount Lemmon Survey	·	1.4 km	MPC · JPL
448006	2008 DS_{17}	—	February 26, 2008	Mount Lemmon	Mount Lemmon Survey	MRX	1.2 km	MPC · JPL
448007	2008 DK_{18}	—	January 31, 2008	Mount Lemmon	Mount Lemmon Survey	·	1.7 km	MPC · JPL
448008	2008 DW_{21}	—	February 28, 2008	Catalina	CSS	·	2.0 km	MPC · JPL
448009	2008 DC_{32}	—	February 2, 2008	Kitt Peak	Spacewatch	·	2.0 km	MPC · JPL
448010	2008 DP_{33}	—	February 3, 2008	Catalina	CSS	·	1.9 km	MPC · JPL
448011	2008 DL_{38}	—	February 13, 2008	Mount Lemmon	Mount Lemmon Survey	·	2.3 km	MPC · JPL
448012	2008 DY_{43}	—	February 28, 2008	Mount Lemmon	Mount Lemmon Survey	EOS	1.6 km	MPC · JPL
448013	2008 DT_{45}	—	February 28, 2008	Kitt Peak	Spacewatch	·	1.8 km	MPC · JPL
448014	2008 DQ_{53}	—	January 20, 2008	Mount Lemmon	Mount Lemmon Survey	CLO	1.9 km	MPC · JPL
448015	2008 DF_{61}	—	January 30, 2008	Kitt Peak	Spacewatch	·	1.5 km	MPC · JPL
448016	2008 DG_{69}	—	February 29, 2008	Purple Mountain	PMO NEO Survey Program	·	1.4 km	MPC · JPL
448017	2008 DB_{73}	—	February 26, 2008	Mount Lemmon	Mount Lemmon Survey	·	1.4 km	MPC · JPL
448018	2008 DY_{80}	—	February 26, 2008	Kitt Peak	Spacewatch	·	1.5 km	MPC · JPL
448019	2008 DT_{86}	—	February 28, 2008	Mount Lemmon	Mount Lemmon Survey	·	2.7 km	MPC · JPL
448020	2008 DO_{89}	—	February 29, 2008	Mount Lemmon	Mount Lemmon Survey	JUN	1.1 km	MPC · JPL
448021	2008 EF_{11}	—	March 1, 2008	Kitt Peak	Spacewatch	·	1.9 km	MPC · JPL
448022	2008 ET_{14}	—	March 1, 2008	Kitt Peak	Spacewatch	·	1.6 km	MPC · JPL
448023	2008 EV_{25}	—	February 8, 2008	Mount Lemmon	Mount Lemmon Survey	·	1.7 km	MPC · JPL
448024	2008 EF_{26}	—	February 3, 2008	Catalina	CSS	JUN	1.0 km	MPC · JPL
448025	2008 EV_{38}	—	March 4, 2008	Kitt Peak	Spacewatch	·	2.4 km	MPC · JPL
448026	2008 EK_{39}	—	March 4, 2008	Kitt Peak	Spacewatch	·	3.7 km	MPC · JPL
448027	2008 ED_{42}	—	March 4, 2008	Mount Lemmon	Mount Lemmon Survey	·	2.1 km	MPC · JPL
448028	2008 EC_{47}	—	March 5, 2008	Mount Lemmon	Mount Lemmon Survey	·	2.8 km	MPC · JPL
448029	2008 EX_{50}	—	March 6, 2008	Kitt Peak	Spacewatch	·	2.3 km	MPC · JPL
448030	2008 EJ_{55}	—	March 6, 2008	Mount Lemmon	Mount Lemmon Survey	BRA	1.6 km	MPC · JPL
448031	2008 EQ_{55}	—	March 7, 2008	Mount Lemmon	Mount Lemmon Survey	·	2.2 km	MPC · JPL
448032	2008 EO_{59}	—	March 8, 2008	Mount Lemmon	Mount Lemmon Survey	·	1.8 km	MPC · JPL
448033	2008 EP_{69}	—	February 1, 2008	Mount Lemmon	Mount Lemmon Survey	·	1.9 km	MPC · JPL
448034	2008 EB_{89}	—	March 8, 2008	Socorro	LINEAR	·	3.9 km	MPC · JPL
448035	2008 ER_{100}	—	December 17, 2007	Mount Lemmon	Mount Lemmon Survey	·	1.6 km	MPC · JPL
448036	2008 EV_{113}	—	March 8, 2008	Mount Lemmon	Mount Lemmon Survey	·	1.9 km	MPC · JPL
448037	2008 EX_{115}	—	March 8, 2008	Mount Lemmon	Mount Lemmon Survey	(18466)	1.7 km	MPC · JPL
448038	2008 EV_{116}	—	February 29, 2008	Kitt Peak	Spacewatch	·	1.8 km	MPC · JPL
448039	2008 ER_{143}	—	March 3, 2008	XuYi	PMO NEO Survey Program	·	3.3 km	MPC · JPL
448040	2008 ER_{153}	—	March 13, 2008	Kitt Peak	Spacewatch	·	1.4 km	MPC · JPL
448041	2008 EX_{156}	—	March 11, 2008	Kitt Peak	Spacewatch	KOR	1.2 km	MPC · JPL
448042	2008 EA_{159}	—	March 13, 2008	Catalina	CSS	T_{j} (2.97)	3.7 km	MPC · JPL
448043	2008 EQ_{162}	—	March 13, 2008	Kitt Peak	Spacewatch	·	1.9 km	MPC · JPL
448044	2008 EA_{168}	—	March 10, 2008	Kitt Peak	Spacewatch	·	1.6 km	MPC · JPL
448045	2008 FH_{6}	—	January 18, 2008	Mount Lemmon	Mount Lemmon Survey	·	2.6 km	MPC · JPL
448046	2008 FU_{19}	—	March 27, 2008	Mount Lemmon	Mount Lemmon Survey	KOR	1.5 km	MPC · JPL
448047	2008 FY_{41}	—	November 20, 2006	Kitt Peak	Spacewatch	AGN	1.2 km	MPC · JPL
448048	2008 FK_{45}	—	March 28, 2008	Mount Lemmon	Mount Lemmon Survey	AEO	940 m	MPC · JPL
448049	2008 FE_{47}	—	March 28, 2008	Kitt Peak	Spacewatch	(18466)	2.8 km	MPC · JPL
448050	2008 FR_{61}	—	March 30, 2008	Kitt Peak	Spacewatch	·	4.0 km	MPC · JPL
448051 Pepisensi	2008 FW_{61}	Pepisensi	March 31, 2008	La Murta	Pastor, S., Reyes, J. A.	·	2.6 km	MPC · JPL
448052	2008 FS_{65}	—	March 28, 2008	Mount Lemmon	Mount Lemmon Survey	·	3.2 km	MPC · JPL
448053	2008 FL_{66}	—	March 28, 2008	Kitt Peak	Spacewatch	·	3.9 km	MPC · JPL
448054	2008 FZ_{83}	—	March 10, 2008	Kitt Peak	Spacewatch	·	2.7 km	MPC · JPL
448055	2008 FG_{88}	—	March 28, 2008	Mount Lemmon	Mount Lemmon Survey	EOS	1.5 km	MPC · JPL
448056	2008 FV_{94}	—	March 29, 2008	Kitt Peak	Spacewatch	LIX	2.7 km	MPC · JPL
448057	2008 FW_{100}	—	March 30, 2008	Kitt Peak	Spacewatch	·	2.4 km	MPC · JPL
448058	2008 FC_{117}	—	March 31, 2008	Kitt Peak	Spacewatch	BRA	1.4 km	MPC · JPL
448059	2008 FS_{131}	—	March 27, 2008	Mount Lemmon	Mount Lemmon Survey	L5	8.3 km	MPC · JPL
448060	2008 FK_{134}	—	March 29, 2008	Kitt Peak	Spacewatch	THM	2.4 km	MPC · JPL
448061	2008 FX_{137}	—	March 31, 2008	Mount Lemmon	Mount Lemmon Survey	·	550 m	MPC · JPL
448062	2008 GT_{24}	—	April 1, 2008	Mount Lemmon	Mount Lemmon Survey	·	2.9 km	MPC · JPL
448063	2008 GG_{39}	—	April 3, 2008	Kitt Peak	Spacewatch	·	3.1 km	MPC · JPL
448064	2008 GY_{39}	—	April 4, 2008	Mount Lemmon	Mount Lemmon Survey	·	1.9 km	MPC · JPL
448065	2008 GB_{50}	—	March 28, 2008	Mount Lemmon	Mount Lemmon Survey	·	2.7 km	MPC · JPL
448066	2008 GY_{51}	—	April 5, 2008	Mount Lemmon	Mount Lemmon Survey	·	2.3 km	MPC · JPL
448067	2008 GV_{55}	—	April 5, 2008	Mount Lemmon	Mount Lemmon Survey	·	1.8 km	MPC · JPL
448068	2008 GU_{70}	—	March 1, 2008	Kitt Peak	Spacewatch	BRA	1.5 km	MPC · JPL
448069	2008 GT_{73}	—	April 7, 2008	Mount Lemmon	Mount Lemmon Survey	EOS	1.6 km	MPC · JPL
448070	2008 GV_{80}	—	April 7, 2008	Mount Lemmon	Mount Lemmon Survey	·	2.0 km	MPC · JPL
448071	2008 GC_{84}	—	April 8, 2008	Mount Lemmon	Mount Lemmon Survey	·	1.5 km	MPC · JPL
448072	2008 GW_{87}	—	March 5, 2008	Mount Lemmon	Mount Lemmon Survey	·	2.8 km	MPC · JPL
448073	2008 GA_{91}	—	April 6, 2008	Mount Lemmon	Mount Lemmon Survey	·	1.4 km	MPC · JPL
448074	2008 GQ_{93}	—	March 25, 2008	Kitt Peak	Spacewatch	·	1.9 km	MPC · JPL
448075	2008 GC_{121}	—	September 29, 2005	Kitt Peak	Spacewatch	KOR	1.2 km	MPC · JPL
448076	2008 GW_{132}	—	April 14, 2008	Mount Lemmon	Mount Lemmon Survey	·	2.1 km	MPC · JPL
448077	2008 GF_{138}	—	April 15, 2008	Kitt Peak	Spacewatch	·	420 m	MPC · JPL
448078	2008 GL_{139}	—	April 4, 2008	Kitt Peak	Spacewatch	EOS	1.6 km	MPC · JPL
448079	2008 GV_{139}	—	April 6, 2008	Kitt Peak	Spacewatch	THB	2.9 km	MPC · JPL
448080	2008 GY_{139}	—	April 6, 2008	Kitt Peak	Spacewatch	EOS	1.6 km	MPC · JPL
448081	2008 HA_{16}	—	April 3, 2008	Kitt Peak	Spacewatch	·	2.9 km	MPC · JPL
448082	2008 HZ_{20}	—	March 15, 2008	Mount Lemmon	Mount Lemmon Survey	·	640 m	MPC · JPL
448083	2008 HD_{29}	—	March 13, 2008	Kitt Peak	Spacewatch	·	1.5 km	MPC · JPL
448084	2008 HN_{29}	—	April 28, 2008	Mount Lemmon	Mount Lemmon Survey	·	1.8 km	MPC · JPL
448085	2008 HF_{36}	—	March 29, 2008	Kitt Peak	Spacewatch	·	2.1 km	MPC · JPL
448086	2008 HW_{50}	—	April 29, 2008	Kitt Peak	Spacewatch	·	2.4 km	MPC · JPL
448087	2008 HO_{52}	—	April 29, 2008	Kitt Peak	Spacewatch	EOS	1.8 km	MPC · JPL
448088	2008 JT_{15}	—	May 4, 2005	Mount Lemmon	Mount Lemmon Survey	·	810 m	MPC · JPL
448089	2008 JQ_{22}	—	April 10, 2008	Kitt Peak	Spacewatch	·	2.6 km	MPC · JPL
448090	2008 JK_{23}	—	April 15, 2008	Kitt Peak	Spacewatch	·	590 m	MPC · JPL
448091	2008 JD_{24}	—	May 8, 2008	Kitt Peak	Spacewatch	EOS	1.7 km	MPC · JPL
448092	2008 JP_{33}	—	April 16, 2008	Mount Lemmon	Mount Lemmon Survey	·	2.3 km	MPC · JPL
448093	2008 JB_{37}	—	May 12, 2008	Siding Spring	SSS	·	4.4 km	MPC · JPL
448094	2008 JK_{38}	—	May 14, 2008	Kitt Peak	Spacewatch	·	560 m	MPC · JPL
448095	2008 KL_{4}	—	April 30, 2008	Mount Lemmon	Mount Lemmon Survey	·	2.4 km	MPC · JPL
448096	2008 KB_{5}	—	April 30, 2008	Mount Lemmon	Mount Lemmon Survey	·	3.9 km	MPC · JPL
448097	2008 KQ_{8}	—	April 3, 2008	Mount Lemmon	Mount Lemmon Survey	·	2.4 km	MPC · JPL
448098	2008 KR_{12}	—	April 15, 2008	Kitt Peak	Spacewatch	·	600 m	MPC · JPL
448099	2008 KF_{13}	—	April 1, 2008	Kitt Peak	Spacewatch	THM	2.0 km	MPC · JPL
448100	2008 KM_{16}	—	May 5, 2008	Kitt Peak	Spacewatch	·	3.4 km	MPC · JPL

== 448101–448200 ==
back to top

Designation			Discovery			Properties		Ref
Permanent	Provisional	Named after	Date	Site	Discoverer(s)	Category	Diam.	Ref
448101	2008 KA_{18}	—	May 2, 2008	Kitt Peak	Spacewatch	·	2.4 km	MPC · JPL
448102	2008 KJ_{18}	—	May 28, 2008	Kitt Peak	Spacewatch	THB	3.4 km	MPC · JPL
448103	2008 KQ_{33}	—	May 7, 2008	Kitt Peak	Spacewatch	·	2.3 km	MPC · JPL
448104	2008 KU_{37}	—	May 30, 2008	Kitt Peak	Spacewatch	·	2.5 km	MPC · JPL
448105	2008 KC_{39}	—	October 8, 2004	Kitt Peak	Spacewatch	·	3.2 km	MPC · JPL
448106	2008 KV_{39}	—	May 31, 2008	Kitt Peak	Spacewatch	·	3.2 km	MPC · JPL
448107	2008 LH_{13}	—	June 7, 2008	Kitt Peak	Spacewatch	·	3.1 km	MPC · JPL
448108	2008 MY_{4}	—	June 26, 2008	Cerro Burek	Burek, Cerro	·	4.1 km	MPC · JPL
448109	2008 NZ_{1}	—	July 7, 2008	La Sagra	OAM	·	730 m	MPC · JPL
448110	2008 NF_{5}	—	July 1, 2008	Catalina	CSS	·	960 m	MPC · JPL
448111	2008 NL_{5}	—	July 1, 2008	Catalina	CSS	·	1.0 km	MPC · JPL
448112	2008 OA_{25}	—	July 30, 2008	Kitt Peak	Spacewatch	·	670 m	MPC · JPL
448113	2008 PR_{7}	—	August 5, 2008	La Sagra	OAM	·	770 m	MPC · JPL
448114	2008 PD_{15}	—	August 10, 2008	La Sagra	OAM	·	610 m	MPC · JPL
448115	2008 QU	—	June 28, 2008	Siding Spring	SSS	PHO	1.6 km	MPC · JPL
448116	2008 QG_{12}	—	August 25, 2008	La Sagra	OAM	·	1.0 km	MPC · JPL
448117	2008 RU_{1}	—	August 23, 2008	Kitt Peak	Spacewatch	·	700 m	MPC · JPL
448118	2008 RU_{5}	—	September 2, 2008	Kitt Peak	Spacewatch	·	950 m	MPC · JPL
448119	2008 RU_{73}	—	August 21, 2008	Kitt Peak	Spacewatch	·	630 m	MPC · JPL
448120	2008 RF_{80}	—	September 2, 2008	Siding Spring	SSS	·	1.2 km	MPC · JPL
448121	2008 RE_{103}	—	September 5, 2008	Kitt Peak	Spacewatch	·	610 m	MPC · JPL
448122	2008 RE_{115}	—	September 6, 2008	Mount Lemmon	Mount Lemmon Survey	·	1.1 km	MPC · JPL
448123	2008 RN_{127}	—	September 6, 2008	Kitt Peak	Spacewatch	·	800 m	MPC · JPL
448124	2008 RG_{128}	—	September 7, 2008	Mount Lemmon	Mount Lemmon Survey	·	620 m	MPC · JPL
448125	2008 RM_{139}	—	September 7, 2008	Mount Lemmon	Mount Lemmon Survey	·	640 m	MPC · JPL
448126	2008 SJ_{10}	—	September 22, 2008	Socorro	LINEAR	V	610 m	MPC · JPL
448127	2008 SF_{15}	—	July 29, 2008	Kitt Peak	Spacewatch	·	590 m	MPC · JPL
448128	2008 SR_{16}	—	July 29, 2008	Kitt Peak	Spacewatch	·	750 m	MPC · JPL
448129	2008 SA_{18}	—	September 19, 2008	Kitt Peak	Spacewatch	·	770 m	MPC · JPL
448130	2008 SO_{22}	—	September 19, 2008	Kitt Peak	Spacewatch	·	670 m	MPC · JPL
448131	2008 SS_{22}	—	September 19, 2008	Kitt Peak	Spacewatch	·	610 m	MPC · JPL
448132	2008 SX_{40}	—	September 6, 2008	Mount Lemmon	Mount Lemmon Survey	·	630 m	MPC · JPL
448133	2008 SG_{59}	—	September 20, 2008	Kitt Peak	Spacewatch	·	1.1 km	MPC · JPL
448134	2008 SJ_{75}	—	August 24, 2008	Kitt Peak	Spacewatch	·	720 m	MPC · JPL
448135	2008 SF_{82}	—	September 4, 2008	Kitt Peak	Spacewatch	(1338) (FLO)	520 m	MPC · JPL
448136	2008 SW_{101}	—	September 7, 2008	Mount Lemmon	Mount Lemmon Survey	·	840 m	MPC · JPL
448137	2008 SV_{115}	—	September 22, 2008	Kitt Peak	Spacewatch	·	1.0 km	MPC · JPL
448138	2008 SN_{117}	—	September 22, 2008	Mount Lemmon	Mount Lemmon Survey	·	780 m	MPC · JPL
448139	2008 SB_{125}	—	September 22, 2008	Mount Lemmon	Mount Lemmon Survey	·	1.1 km	MPC · JPL
448140	2008 SM_{128}	—	September 22, 2008	Kitt Peak	Spacewatch	·	960 m	MPC · JPL
448141	2008 SH_{135}	—	July 29, 2008	Kitt Peak	Spacewatch	·	560 m	MPC · JPL
448142	2008 SG_{137}	—	September 23, 2008	Catalina	CSS	·	680 m	MPC · JPL
448143	2008 SJ_{153}	—	September 22, 2008	Socorro	LINEAR	·	600 m	MPC · JPL
448144	2008 SS_{158}	—	September 24, 2008	Socorro	LINEAR	·	670 m	MPC · JPL
448145	2008 SE_{159}	—	September 24, 2008	Socorro	LINEAR	V	610 m	MPC · JPL
448146	2008 SS_{161}	—	September 28, 2008	Socorro	LINEAR	·	650 m	MPC · JPL
448147	2008 SY_{177}	—	September 23, 2008	Mount Lemmon	Mount Lemmon Survey	NYS	760 m	MPC · JPL
448148	2008 SD_{184}	—	September 24, 2008	Kitt Peak	Spacewatch	·	1.0 km	MPC · JPL
448149	2008 SM_{189}	—	September 21, 2008	Kitt Peak	Spacewatch	·	800 m	MPC · JPL
448150	2008 SZ_{197}	—	September 25, 2008	Kitt Peak	Spacewatch	·	1.0 km	MPC · JPL
448151	2008 ST_{203}	—	September 26, 2008	Kitt Peak	Spacewatch	·	610 m	MPC · JPL
448152	2008 SN_{205}	—	September 26, 2008	Kitt Peak	Spacewatch	V	550 m	MPC · JPL
448153	2008 SC_{214}	—	September 3, 2008	Kitt Peak	Spacewatch	·	480 m	MPC · JPL
448154	2008 SQ_{222}	—	September 25, 2008	Mount Lemmon	Mount Lemmon Survey	V	520 m	MPC · JPL
448155	2008 SA_{241}	—	September 29, 2008	Catalina	CSS	·	660 m	MPC · JPL
448156	2008 SB_{241}	—	September 4, 2008	Kitt Peak	Spacewatch	MAS	680 m	MPC · JPL
448157	2008 SM_{243}	—	September 11, 2004	Kitt Peak	Spacewatch	·	1.1 km	MPC · JPL
448158	2008 SB_{254}	—	September 22, 2008	Kitt Peak	Spacewatch	·	670 m	MPC · JPL
448159	2008 SV_{300}	—	September 23, 2008	Mount Lemmon	Mount Lemmon Survey	·	660 m	MPC · JPL
448160	2008 TX_{14}	—	October 1, 2008	Mount Lemmon	Mount Lemmon Survey	NYS	740 m	MPC · JPL
448161	2008 TG_{24}	—	October 2, 2008	Catalina	CSS	·	980 m	MPC · JPL
448162	2008 TT_{30}	—	October 1, 2008	Kitt Peak	Spacewatch	PHO	1.3 km	MPC · JPL
448163	2008 TN_{36}	—	October 1, 2008	Mount Lemmon	Mount Lemmon Survey	·	610 m	MPC · JPL
448164	2008 TO_{45}	—	October 1, 2008	Mount Lemmon	Mount Lemmon Survey	·	1.0 km	MPC · JPL
448165	2008 TP_{46}	—	October 1, 2008	Kitt Peak	Spacewatch	·	1.0 km	MPC · JPL
448166	2008 TY_{52}	—	September 20, 2008	Kitt Peak	Spacewatch	·	680 m	MPC · JPL
448167	2008 TU_{53}	—	October 2, 2008	Kitt Peak	Spacewatch	V	640 m	MPC · JPL
448168	2008 TN_{57}	—	September 6, 2008	Mount Lemmon	Mount Lemmon Survey	·	810 m	MPC · JPL
448169	2008 TH_{64}	—	October 2, 2008	Kitt Peak	Spacewatch	·	880 m	MPC · JPL
448170	2008 TX_{67}	—	October 2, 2008	Kitt Peak	Spacewatch	·	1.3 km	MPC · JPL
448171	2008 TC_{71}	—	April 7, 2006	Mount Lemmon	Mount Lemmon Survey	·	1.3 km	MPC · JPL
448172	2008 TS_{108}	—	October 6, 2008	Mount Lemmon	Mount Lemmon Survey	·	700 m	MPC · JPL
448173	2008 TM_{129}	—	September 22, 2008	Kitt Peak	Spacewatch	·	970 m	MPC · JPL
448174	2008 TJ_{147}	—	October 9, 2008	Mount Lemmon	Mount Lemmon Survey	·	690 m	MPC · JPL
448175	2008 TC_{148}	—	October 9, 2008	Mount Lemmon	Mount Lemmon Survey	·	560 m	MPC · JPL
448176	2008 TS_{158}	—	October 10, 2008	Kitt Peak	Spacewatch	·	910 m	MPC · JPL
448177	2008 TB_{163}	—	October 1, 2008	Catalina	CSS	·	810 m	MPC · JPL
448178	2008 TG_{167}	—	October 8, 2008	Mount Lemmon	Mount Lemmon Survey	·	650 m	MPC · JPL
448179	2008 TW_{168}	—	October 3, 2008	Mount Lemmon	Mount Lemmon Survey	·	830 m	MPC · JPL
448180	2008 TB_{171}	—	October 9, 2008	Mount Lemmon	Mount Lemmon Survey	NYS	1.2 km	MPC · JPL
448181	2008 TO_{186}	—	October 15, 2001	Kitt Peak	Spacewatch	·	530 m	MPC · JPL
448182	2008 UO_{4}	—	October 25, 2008	Catalina	CSS	·	970 m	MPC · JPL
448183	2008 UT_{7}	—	October 17, 2008	Kitt Peak	Spacewatch	·	740 m	MPC · JPL
448184	2008 UA_{15}	—	October 18, 2008	Kitt Peak	Spacewatch	·	1.1 km	MPC · JPL
448185	2008 UK_{17}	—	October 18, 2008	Kitt Peak	Spacewatch	(2076)	650 m	MPC · JPL
448186	2008 UA_{39}	—	October 20, 2008	Kitt Peak	Spacewatch	·	1.8 km	MPC · JPL
448187	2008 UH_{39}	—	October 20, 2008	Kitt Peak	Spacewatch	·	1.4 km	MPC · JPL
448188	2008 UT_{40}	—	October 20, 2008	Kitt Peak	Spacewatch	V	520 m	MPC · JPL
448189	2008 US_{41}	—	October 20, 2008	Kitt Peak	Spacewatch	·	880 m	MPC · JPL
448190	2008 UW_{46}	—	October 20, 2008	Kitt Peak	Spacewatch	·	1 km	MPC · JPL
448191	2008 UV_{47}	—	October 20, 2008	Kitt Peak	Spacewatch	V	720 m	MPC · JPL
448192	2008 UQ_{80}	—	October 22, 2008	Kitt Peak	Spacewatch	V	510 m	MPC · JPL
448193	2008 UP_{85}	—	September 21, 2008	Kitt Peak	Spacewatch	·	770 m	MPC · JPL
448194	2008 UN_{88}	—	December 2, 2005	Kitt Peak	Spacewatch	·	1.1 km	MPC · JPL
448195	2008 UT_{101}	—	September 23, 2008	Kitt Peak	Spacewatch	·	800 m	MPC · JPL
448196	2008 US_{115}	—	October 22, 2008	Kitt Peak	Spacewatch	(2076)	860 m	MPC · JPL
448197	2008 US_{130}	—	September 6, 2008	Mount Lemmon	Mount Lemmon Survey	NYS	900 m	MPC · JPL
448198	2008 UY_{131}	—	September 23, 2008	Mount Lemmon	Mount Lemmon Survey	NYS	980 m	MPC · JPL
448199	2008 UC_{135}	—	October 23, 2008	Kitt Peak	Spacewatch	·	690 m	MPC · JPL
448200	2008 UP_{135}	—	October 23, 2008	Kitt Peak	Spacewatch	·	1.3 km	MPC · JPL

== 448201–448300 ==
back to top

Designation			Discovery			Properties		Ref
Permanent	Provisional	Named after	Date	Site	Discoverer(s)	Category	Diam.	Ref
448201	2008 UD_{143}	—	October 23, 2008	Kitt Peak	Spacewatch	·	900 m	MPC · JPL
448202	2008 UF_{151}	—	October 23, 2008	Kitt Peak	Spacewatch	·	910 m	MPC · JPL
448203	2008 UH_{167}	—	October 24, 2008	Kitt Peak	Spacewatch	3:2 · SHU	4.6 km	MPC · JPL
448204	2008 UV_{174}	—	September 22, 2008	Mount Lemmon	Mount Lemmon Survey	MAS	680 m	MPC · JPL
448205	2008 US_{188}	—	October 25, 2008	Kitt Peak	Spacewatch	·	910 m	MPC · JPL
448206	2008 UA_{193}	—	October 25, 2008	Mount Lemmon	Mount Lemmon Survey	V	680 m	MPC · JPL
448207	2008 UM_{206}	—	October 22, 2008	Kitt Peak	Spacewatch	·	1.3 km	MPC · JPL
448208	2008 UG_{212}	—	September 22, 2008	Kitt Peak	Spacewatch	·	990 m	MPC · JPL
448209	2008 UF_{227}	—	September 7, 2008	Mount Lemmon	Mount Lemmon Survey	·	920 m	MPC · JPL
448210	2008 UP_{233}	—	October 26, 2008	Kitt Peak	Spacewatch	V	640 m	MPC · JPL
448211	2008 UH_{247}	—	October 26, 2008	Kitt Peak	Spacewatch	·	880 m	MPC · JPL
448212	2008 UK_{248}	—	October 26, 2008	Kitt Peak	Spacewatch	MAS	600 m	MPC · JPL
448213	2008 UO_{258}	—	October 23, 2008	Kitt Peak	Spacewatch	ERI	1.3 km	MPC · JPL
448214	2008 UK_{262}	—	October 27, 2008	Kitt Peak	Spacewatch	·	1.1 km	MPC · JPL
448215	2008 UF_{274}	—	February 4, 2006	Kitt Peak	Spacewatch	·	1.1 km	MPC · JPL
448216	2008 UO_{276}	—	October 28, 2008	Mount Lemmon	Mount Lemmon Survey	·	750 m	MPC · JPL
448217	2008 UY_{276}	—	October 28, 2008	Mount Lemmon	Mount Lemmon Survey	·	670 m	MPC · JPL
448218	2008 UA_{283}	—	October 28, 2008	Mount Lemmon	Mount Lemmon Survey	NYS	940 m	MPC · JPL
448219	2008 UW_{294}	—	October 29, 2008	Kitt Peak	Spacewatch	·	1.4 km	MPC · JPL
448220	2008 UJ_{327}	—	September 28, 2008	Catalina	CSS	PHO	1.3 km	MPC · JPL
448221	2008 UH_{329}	—	October 31, 2008	Kitt Peak	Spacewatch	·	710 m	MPC · JPL
448222	2008 UO_{354}	—	October 27, 2008	Mount Lemmon	Mount Lemmon Survey	·	800 m	MPC · JPL
448223	2008 UK_{355}	—	October 23, 2008	Mount Lemmon	Mount Lemmon Survey	NYS	840 m	MPC · JPL
448224	2008 UK_{357}	—	October 24, 2008	Kitt Peak	Spacewatch	·	960 m	MPC · JPL
448225	2008 VP_{3}	—	November 3, 2008	Bisei SG Center	BATTeRS	·	1.6 km	MPC · JPL
448226	2008 VV_{6}	—	November 1, 2008	Mount Lemmon	Mount Lemmon Survey	NYS	900 m	MPC · JPL
448227	2008 VL_{20}	—	November 1, 2008	Mount Lemmon	Mount Lemmon Survey	·	970 m	MPC · JPL
448228	2008 VM_{24}	—	November 1, 2008	Kitt Peak	Spacewatch	·	1.6 km	MPC · JPL
448229	2008 VJ_{46}	—	November 3, 2008	Kitt Peak	Spacewatch	MAS	680 m	MPC · JPL
448230	2008 VY_{68}	—	November 6, 2008	Mount Lemmon	Mount Lemmon Survey	·	1.6 km	MPC · JPL
448231	2008 VY_{71}	—	November 1, 2008	Mount Lemmon	Mount Lemmon Survey	·	980 m	MPC · JPL
448232	2008 VC_{73}	—	November 1, 2008	Mount Lemmon	Mount Lemmon Survey	V	610 m	MPC · JPL
448233	2008 WN_{8}	—	November 17, 2008	Kitt Peak	Spacewatch	·	2.3 km	MPC · JPL
448234	2008 WY_{22}	—	November 18, 2008	Catalina	CSS	NYS	1 km	MPC · JPL
448235	2008 WT_{23}	—	November 18, 2008	Catalina	CSS	·	800 m	MPC · JPL
448236	2008 WS_{28}	—	September 22, 2008	Mount Lemmon	Mount Lemmon Survey	·	840 m	MPC · JPL
448237	2008 WF_{30}	—	November 19, 2008	Mount Lemmon	Mount Lemmon Survey	·	990 m	MPC · JPL
448238	2008 WK_{31}	—	November 19, 2008	Mount Lemmon	Mount Lemmon Survey	·	970 m	MPC · JPL
448239	2008 WK_{40}	—	September 27, 2008	Mount Lemmon	Mount Lemmon Survey	NYS	920 m	MPC · JPL
448240	2008 WK_{42}	—	September 9, 2008	Mount Lemmon	Mount Lemmon Survey	NYS	800 m	MPC · JPL
448241	2008 WL_{43}	—	October 21, 2008	Mount Lemmon	Mount Lemmon Survey	·	880 m	MPC · JPL
448242	2008 WX_{48}	—	November 18, 2008	Catalina	CSS	·	970 m	MPC · JPL
448243	2008 WR_{51}	—	November 19, 2008	Kitt Peak	Spacewatch	·	580 m	MPC · JPL
448244	2008 WK_{65}	—	October 1, 2008	Mount Lemmon	Mount Lemmon Survey	·	980 m	MPC · JPL
448245	2008 WS_{68}	—	November 7, 2008	Mount Lemmon	Mount Lemmon Survey	·	740 m	MPC · JPL
448246	2008 WH_{91}	—	April 18, 2007	Mount Lemmon	Mount Lemmon Survey	V	550 m	MPC · JPL
448247	2008 WJ_{92}	—	September 24, 2008	Mount Lemmon	Mount Lemmon Survey	MAS	610 m	MPC · JPL
448248	2008 WY_{104}	—	October 24, 2008	Kitt Peak	Spacewatch	·	1.1 km	MPC · JPL
448249	2008 WQ_{111}	—	November 30, 2008	Kitt Peak	Spacewatch	·	800 m	MPC · JPL
448250	2008 WC_{115}	—	November 30, 2008	Mount Lemmon	Mount Lemmon Survey	·	890 m	MPC · JPL
448251	2008 WU_{117}	—	November 30, 2008	Mount Lemmon	Mount Lemmon Survey	·	1.4 km	MPC · JPL
448252	2008 WA_{140}	—	November 24, 2008	Mount Lemmon	Mount Lemmon Survey	MAS	740 m	MPC · JPL
448253	2008 WG_{141}	—	November 6, 2008	Kitt Peak	Spacewatch	·	820 m	MPC · JPL
448254	2008 XF_{6}	—	December 4, 2008	Socorro	LINEAR	·	1.3 km	MPC · JPL
448255	2008 XJ_{17}	—	December 1, 2008	Kitt Peak	Spacewatch	·	1.0 km	MPC · JPL
448256	2008 XK_{50}	—	December 4, 2008	Mount Lemmon	Mount Lemmon Survey	·	1.3 km	MPC · JPL
448257	2008 XG_{52}	—	December 4, 2008	Kitt Peak	Spacewatch	·	1.2 km	MPC · JPL
448258	2008 YV	—	December 7, 2008	Mount Lemmon	Mount Lemmon Survey	·	810 m	MPC · JPL
448259	2008 YZ_{6}	—	December 23, 2008	Dauban	Kugel, F.	·	1.2 km	MPC · JPL
448260	2008 YE_{14}	—	December 4, 2008	Mount Lemmon	Mount Lemmon Survey	·	1.3 km	MPC · JPL
448261	2008 YX_{16}	—	December 21, 2008	Mount Lemmon	Mount Lemmon Survey	·	1.7 km	MPC · JPL
448262	2008 YC_{19}	—	December 21, 2008	Mount Lemmon	Mount Lemmon Survey	NYS	980 m	MPC · JPL
448263	2008 YQ_{46}	—	December 29, 2008	Mount Lemmon	Mount Lemmon Survey	·	850 m	MPC · JPL
448264	2008 YD_{51}	—	December 29, 2008	Mount Lemmon	Mount Lemmon Survey	·	1.2 km	MPC · JPL
448265	2008 YW_{52}	—	December 29, 2008	Mount Lemmon	Mount Lemmon Survey	·	950 m	MPC · JPL
448266	2008 YK_{56}	—	October 23, 2008	Mount Lemmon	Mount Lemmon Survey	NYS	1.1 km	MPC · JPL
448267	2008 YM_{58}	—	December 30, 2008	Kitt Peak	Spacewatch	·	1.1 km	MPC · JPL
448268	2008 YF_{62}	—	October 30, 2008	Kitt Peak	Spacewatch	·	1 km	MPC · JPL
448269	2008 YA_{83}	—	December 21, 2008	Kitt Peak	Spacewatch	MAS	740 m	MPC · JPL
448270	2008 YO_{99}	—	December 29, 2008	Kitt Peak	Spacewatch	·	900 m	MPC · JPL
448271	2008 YS_{99}	—	December 29, 2008	Kitt Peak	Spacewatch	3:2	4.6 km	MPC · JPL
448272	2008 YG_{102}	—	December 29, 2008	Kitt Peak	Spacewatch	MAS	590 m	MPC · JPL
448273	2008 YJ_{108}	—	December 29, 2008	Kitt Peak	Spacewatch	MAS	700 m	MPC · JPL
448274	2008 YB_{111}	—	April 2, 2006	Kitt Peak	Spacewatch	·	1.0 km	MPC · JPL
448275	2008 YN_{123}	—	December 30, 2008	Kitt Peak	Spacewatch	NYS	1.2 km	MPC · JPL
448276	2008 YP_{141}	—	November 24, 2008	Mount Lemmon	Mount Lemmon Survey	MAS	670 m	MPC · JPL
448277	2008 YA_{146}	—	December 30, 2008	Kitt Peak	Spacewatch	·	980 m	MPC · JPL
448278	2008 YW_{152}	—	December 30, 2008	Mount Lemmon	Mount Lemmon Survey	·	1 km	MPC · JPL
448279	2008 YB_{153}	—	December 30, 2008	Kitt Peak	Spacewatch	NYS	1.2 km	MPC · JPL
448280	2008 YB_{158}	—	December 30, 2008	Mount Lemmon	Mount Lemmon Survey	·	1.2 km	MPC · JPL
448281	2008 YH_{160}	—	December 31, 2008	XuYi	PMO NEO Survey Program	·	1.1 km	MPC · JPL
448282	2008 YG_{164}	—	November 24, 2008	Mount Lemmon	Mount Lemmon Survey	·	1.8 km	MPC · JPL
448283	2008 YJ_{170}	—	December 22, 2008	Kitt Peak	Spacewatch	·	1.1 km	MPC · JPL
448284	2009 AH_{8}	—	January 1, 2009	Kitt Peak	Spacewatch	3:2	4.4 km	MPC · JPL
448285	2009 AA_{12}	—	December 22, 2008	Kitt Peak	Spacewatch	MAS	530 m	MPC · JPL
448286	2009 AR_{20}	—	January 2, 2009	Mount Lemmon	Mount Lemmon Survey	NYS	1.1 km	MPC · JPL
448287	2009 AK_{23}	—	January 3, 2009	Kitt Peak	Spacewatch	MAS	540 m	MPC · JPL
448288	2009 AM_{26}	—	November 24, 2008	Mount Lemmon	Mount Lemmon Survey	·	1.2 km	MPC · JPL
448289	2009 BA_{8}	—	January 8, 2009	Kitt Peak	Spacewatch	·	1.6 km	MPC · JPL
448290	2009 BS_{11}	—	January 18, 2009	Catalina	CSS	·	1.6 km	MPC · JPL
448291	2009 BV_{13}	—	January 27, 2009	Socorro	LINEAR	·	1.6 km	MPC · JPL
448292	2009 BH_{14}	—	January 24, 2009	Calar Alto	F. Hormuth	ERI	1.0 km	MPC · JPL
448293	2009 BQ_{18}	—	December 30, 2008	Kitt Peak	Spacewatch	·	870 m	MPC · JPL
448294	2009 BB_{21}	—	January 16, 2009	Mount Lemmon	Mount Lemmon Survey	·	950 m	MPC · JPL
448295	2009 BS_{21}	—	January 17, 2009	Kitt Peak	Spacewatch	·	1.3 km	MPC · JPL
448296	2009 BE_{30}	—	January 2, 2009	Kitt Peak	Spacewatch	NYS	980 m	MPC · JPL
448297	2009 BL_{33}	—	January 16, 2009	Kitt Peak	Spacewatch	·	870 m	MPC · JPL
448298	2009 BG_{35}	—	January 16, 2009	Kitt Peak	Spacewatch	·	1.0 km	MPC · JPL
448299	2009 BR_{42}	—	January 16, 2009	Kitt Peak	Spacewatch	NYS	890 m	MPC · JPL
448300	2009 BN_{60}	—	January 17, 2009	Mount Lemmon	Mount Lemmon Survey	(2076)	980 m	MPC · JPL

== 448301–448400 ==
back to top

Designation			Discovery			Properties		Ref
Permanent	Provisional	Named after	Date	Site	Discoverer(s)	Category	Diam.	Ref
448301	2009 BE_{62}	—	January 18, 2009	Kitt Peak	Spacewatch	EUN	1.2 km	MPC · JPL
448302	2009 BN_{72}	—	January 28, 2009	Dauban	Kugel, F.	·	1.4 km	MPC · JPL
448303	2009 BM_{82}	—	December 1, 2008	Mount Lemmon	Mount Lemmon Survey	·	1.2 km	MPC · JPL
448304	2009 BD_{98}	—	January 26, 2009	Mount Lemmon	Mount Lemmon Survey	NYS	1.3 km	MPC · JPL
448305	2009 BL_{101}	—	January 20, 2009	Catalina	CSS	·	1.4 km	MPC · JPL
448306	2009 BH_{126}	—	January 15, 2009	Kitt Peak	Spacewatch	·	1.1 km	MPC · JPL
448307	2009 BW_{131}	—	October 23, 2004	Kitt Peak	Spacewatch	·	1.1 km	MPC · JPL
448308	2009 BP_{136}	—	January 29, 2009	Kitt Peak	Spacewatch	·	770 m	MPC · JPL
448309	2009 BL_{141}	—	January 30, 2009	Kitt Peak	Spacewatch	·	1.1 km	MPC · JPL
448310	2009 BQ_{141}	—	January 30, 2009	Kitt Peak	Spacewatch	·	1.3 km	MPC · JPL
448311	2009 BV_{163}	—	January 31, 2009	Kitt Peak	Spacewatch	·	1.4 km	MPC · JPL
448312	2009 BA_{173}	—	January 20, 2009	Kitt Peak	Spacewatch	·	1.3 km	MPC · JPL
448313	2009 BX_{184}	—	January 20, 2009	Socorro	LINEAR	·	1.4 km	MPC · JPL
448314	2009 BX_{185}	—	January 28, 2009	Catalina	CSS	BRG	1.8 km	MPC · JPL
448315	2009 CJ_{1}	—	February 3, 2009	Socorro	LINEAR	H	700 m	MPC · JPL
448316	2009 CJ_{25}	—	October 7, 1996	Kitt Peak	Spacewatch	MAS	770 m	MPC · JPL
448317	2009 CU_{54}	—	January 19, 2009	Mount Lemmon	Mount Lemmon Survey	·	1.3 km	MPC · JPL
448318	2009 CU_{65}	—	February 4, 2009	Mount Lemmon	Mount Lemmon Survey	·	1.2 km	MPC · JPL
448319	2009 DV_{11}	—	January 24, 2009	XuYi	PMO NEO Survey Program	·	1.6 km	MPC · JPL
448320	2009 DY_{51}	—	January 18, 2009	Kitt Peak	Spacewatch	·	1.0 km	MPC · JPL
448321	2009 DW_{53}	—	February 22, 2009	Kitt Peak	Spacewatch	MAS	640 m	MPC · JPL
448322	2009 DG_{56}	—	February 22, 2009	Kitt Peak	Spacewatch	·	1.1 km	MPC · JPL
448323	2009 DK_{58}	—	February 22, 2009	Kitt Peak	Spacewatch	·	1 km	MPC · JPL
448324	2009 DN_{70}	—	February 3, 2009	Kitt Peak	Spacewatch	·	970 m	MPC · JPL
448325	2009 DQ_{72}	—	February 22, 2009	Mount Lemmon	Mount Lemmon Survey	(5)	910 m	MPC · JPL
448326	2009 DU_{108}	—	February 20, 2009	Kitt Peak	Spacewatch	·	1.2 km	MPC · JPL
448327	2009 DQ_{110}	—	February 21, 2009	Catalina	CSS	·	2.4 km	MPC · JPL
448328	2009 DW_{110}	—	January 29, 2009	Catalina	CSS	·	1.8 km	MPC · JPL
448329	2009 DJ_{124}	—	February 19, 2009	Kitt Peak	Spacewatch	·	2.1 km	MPC · JPL
448330	2009 DZ_{136}	—	February 26, 2009	Catalina	CSS	·	1.6 km	MPC · JPL
448331	2009 DX_{141}	—	February 20, 2009	Catalina	CSS	·	1.6 km	MPC · JPL
448332	2009 DF_{142}	—	February 26, 2009	Kitt Peak	Spacewatch	·	2.0 km	MPC · JPL
448333	2009 EC_{17}	—	January 29, 2009	Mount Lemmon	Mount Lemmon Survey	H	420 m	MPC · JPL
448334	2009 EG_{30}	—	March 3, 2009	Catalina	CSS	H	590 m	MPC · JPL
448335	2009 EJ_{30}	—	March 3, 2009	Kitt Peak	Spacewatch	·	1.4 km	MPC · JPL
448336	2009 FU_{15}	—	March 17, 2009	Kitt Peak	Spacewatch	·	880 m	MPC · JPL
448337	2009 FA_{24}	—	March 18, 2009	La Sagra	OAM	·	3.2 km	MPC · JPL
448338	2009 FP_{24}	—	March 20, 2009	La Sagra	OAM	·	3.3 km	MPC · JPL
448339	2009 FQ_{31}	—	March 28, 2009	Siding Spring	SSS	H	530 m	MPC · JPL
448340	2009 FM_{38}	—	March 18, 2009	Catalina	CSS	EUN	1.6 km	MPC · JPL
448341	2009 FO_{46}	—	March 19, 2009	Kitt Peak	Spacewatch	H	690 m	MPC · JPL
448342	2009 FS_{46}	—	March 27, 2009	Catalina	CSS	EUN	1.5 km	MPC · JPL
448343	2009 FJ_{48}	—	March 24, 2009	Mount Lemmon	Mount Lemmon Survey	·	1.5 km	MPC · JPL
448344	2009 FX_{57}	—	March 17, 2009	Kitt Peak	Spacewatch	·	1.8 km	MPC · JPL
448345	2009 FN_{58}	—	March 21, 2009	Mount Lemmon	Mount Lemmon Survey	·	940 m	MPC · JPL
448346	2009 FK_{59}	—	March 26, 2009	Kitt Peak	Spacewatch	·	1.7 km	MPC · JPL
448347	2009 FZ_{62}	—	March 26, 2009	Kitt Peak	Spacewatch	·	1.8 km	MPC · JPL
448348	2009 FB_{64}	—	March 31, 2009	Kitt Peak	Spacewatch	·	1.7 km	MPC · JPL
448349	2009 FU_{65}	—	March 19, 2009	Mount Lemmon	Mount Lemmon Survey	H	490 m	MPC · JPL
448350	2009 FA_{72}	—	March 17, 2009	Kitt Peak	Spacewatch	·	1.7 km	MPC · JPL
448351	2009 GR	—	April 4, 2009	Cerro Burek	Burek, Cerro	H	620 m	MPC · JPL
448352	2009 GY	—	April 3, 2009	Cerro Burek	Burek, Cerro	·	2.7 km	MPC · JPL
448353	2009 HE_{1}	—	February 20, 2009	Mount Lemmon	Mount Lemmon Survey	·	1.4 km	MPC · JPL
448354	2009 HN_{9}	—	March 24, 2009	Mount Lemmon	Mount Lemmon Survey	·	2.2 km	MPC · JPL
448355	2009 HL_{12}	—	March 31, 2009	Kitt Peak	Spacewatch	GEF	1.1 km	MPC · JPL
448356	2009 HS_{13}	—	March 16, 2009	Kitt Peak	Spacewatch	·	1.9 km	MPC · JPL
448357	2009 HV_{14}	—	March 28, 2009	Kitt Peak	Spacewatch	·	1.4 km	MPC · JPL
448358	2009 HD_{18}	—	March 31, 2009	Kitt Peak	Spacewatch	·	1.9 km	MPC · JPL
448359	2009 HZ_{21}	—	March 23, 2009	XuYi	PMO NEO Survey Program	H	490 m	MPC · JPL
448360	2009 HS_{27}	—	March 17, 2009	Kitt Peak	Spacewatch	·	1.8 km	MPC · JPL
448361	2009 HA_{44}	—	April 20, 2009	Kitt Peak	Spacewatch	·	1.5 km	MPC · JPL
448362	2009 HX_{47}	—	March 18, 2009	Kitt Peak	Spacewatch	·	2.0 km	MPC · JPL
448363	2009 HA_{48}	—	April 19, 2009	Kitt Peak	Spacewatch	EUN	1.2 km	MPC · JPL
448364	2009 HO_{51}	—	April 21, 2009	Kitt Peak	Spacewatch	·	2.0 km	MPC · JPL
448365	2009 HB_{52}	—	February 19, 2009	Kitt Peak	Spacewatch	·	2.0 km	MPC · JPL
448366	2009 HF_{60}	—	April 26, 2009	Catalina	CSS	H	560 m	MPC · JPL
448367	2009 HB_{65}	—	April 20, 2009	Mount Lemmon	Mount Lemmon Survey	·	1.4 km	MPC · JPL
448368	2009 HV_{71}	—	April 24, 2009	Kitt Peak	Spacewatch	·	1.5 km	MPC · JPL
448369	2009 HH_{74}	—	April 1, 2009	Catalina	CSS	·	1.8 km	MPC · JPL
448370	2009 HX_{97}	—	April 19, 2009	Kitt Peak	Spacewatch	·	2.0 km	MPC · JPL
448371	2009 JK_{12}	—	May 15, 2009	La Sagra	OAM	·	1.6 km	MPC · JPL
448372	2009 KJ_{1}	—	May 18, 2009	La Sagra	OAM	H	650 m	MPC · JPL
448373	2009 KM_{4}	—	May 24, 2009	Kitt Peak	Spacewatch	T_{j} (2.98)	4.4 km	MPC · JPL
448374	2009 KL_{5}	—	April 24, 2009	Kitt Peak	Spacewatch	·	1.5 km	MPC · JPL
448375	2009 KB_{11}	—	May 25, 2009	Kitt Peak	Spacewatch	·	2.4 km	MPC · JPL
448376	2009 KL_{14}	—	May 26, 2009	Kitt Peak	Spacewatch	H	510 m	MPC · JPL
448377	2009 KC_{16}	—	May 1, 2009	Kitt Peak	Spacewatch	·	1.8 km	MPC · JPL
448378	2009 KL_{24}	—	May 1, 2009	Kitt Peak	Spacewatch	·	2.3 km	MPC · JPL
448379	2009 LV_{1}	—	June 12, 2009	Kitt Peak	Spacewatch	·	1.5 km	MPC · JPL
448380	2009 LX_{1}	—	June 12, 2009	Kitt Peak	Spacewatch	·	2.9 km	MPC · JPL
448381	2009 ML_{10}	—	May 28, 2008	Kitt Peak	Spacewatch	·	3.4 km	MPC · JPL
448382	2009 OD	—	June 21, 2009	Mount Lemmon	Mount Lemmon Survey	·	2.7 km	MPC · JPL
448383	2009 OX_{10}	—	July 28, 2009	Catalina	CSS	·	3.2 km	MPC · JPL
448384	2009 OH_{14}	—	July 29, 2009	Catalina	CSS	·	4.4 km	MPC · JPL
448385	2009 PS_{8}	—	August 15, 2009	Catalina	CSS	·	5.4 km	MPC · JPL
448386	2009 PP_{17}	—	August 1, 2009	Kitt Peak	Spacewatch	·	2.2 km	MPC · JPL
448387	2009 PW_{19}	—	August 15, 2009	Catalina	CSS	·	4.1 km	MPC · JPL
448388	2009 QS_{7}	—	August 18, 2009	Bergisch Gladbach	W. Bickel	·	2.4 km	MPC · JPL
448389	2009 QX_{14}	—	August 16, 2009	Kitt Peak	Spacewatch	EOS	2.3 km	MPC · JPL
448390	2009 QJ_{16}	—	August 16, 2009	Kitt Peak	Spacewatch	·	3.1 km	MPC · JPL
448391	2009 QM_{17}	—	August 17, 2009	Kitt Peak	Spacewatch	·	3.4 km	MPC · JPL
448392	2009 QK_{19}	—	August 18, 2009	Kitt Peak	Spacewatch	·	2.8 km	MPC · JPL
448393	2009 QM_{28}	—	July 14, 2009	Kitt Peak	Spacewatch	·	2.7 km	MPC · JPL
448394	2009 QP_{37}	—	August 15, 2009	Kitt Peak	Spacewatch	·	2.7 km	MPC · JPL
448395	2009 QM_{45}	—	August 28, 2009	La Sagra	OAM	·	2.7 km	MPC · JPL
448396	2009 QN_{45}	—	August 28, 2009	La Sagra	OAM	·	3.8 km	MPC · JPL
448397	2009 QV_{60}	—	January 30, 2008	Mount Lemmon	Mount Lemmon Survey	·	3.6 km	MPC · JPL
448398	2009 RD_{3}	—	September 10, 2009	La Sagra	OAM	·	3.3 km	MPC · JPL
448399	2009 RF_{10}	—	September 12, 2009	Kitt Peak	Spacewatch	·	2.9 km	MPC · JPL
448400	2009 RL_{11}	—	September 12, 2009	Kitt Peak	Spacewatch	·	2.4 km	MPC · JPL

== 448401–448500 ==
back to top

Designation			Discovery			Properties		Ref
Permanent	Provisional	Named after	Date	Site	Discoverer(s)	Category	Diam.	Ref
448401	2009 RV_{17}	—	September 12, 2009	Kitt Peak	Spacewatch	·	2.6 km	MPC · JPL
448402	2009 RD_{61}	—	May 30, 2009	Mount Lemmon	Mount Lemmon Survey	·	1.3 km	MPC · JPL
448403	2009 RQ_{65}	—	September 15, 2009	Siding Spring	SSS	·	4.2 km	MPC · JPL
448404	2009 RY_{67}	—	September 15, 2009	Kitt Peak	Spacewatch	·	3.0 km	MPC · JPL
448405	2009 RV_{74}	—	September 15, 2009	Kitt Peak	Spacewatch	·	3.4 km	MPC · JPL
448406	2009 SZ_{3}	—	September 16, 2009	Kitt Peak	Spacewatch	·	2.2 km	MPC · JPL
448407	2009 SS_{10}	—	August 17, 2009	Catalina	CSS	·	3.9 km	MPC · JPL
448408	2009 SJ_{16}	—	August 29, 2009	Catalina	CSS	·	2.5 km	MPC · JPL
448409	2009 SB_{26}	—	March 13, 2007	Kitt Peak	Spacewatch	·	3.5 km	MPC · JPL
448410	2009 SL_{66}	—	September 17, 2009	Kitt Peak	Spacewatch	·	3.1 km	MPC · JPL
448411	2009 SR_{91}	—	August 27, 2009	Kitt Peak	Spacewatch	·	2.1 km	MPC · JPL
448412	2009 SS_{109}	—	September 17, 2009	Kitt Peak	Spacewatch	LIX	3.5 km	MPC · JPL
448413	2009 SE_{138}	—	September 18, 2009	Kitt Peak	Spacewatch	·	2.5 km	MPC · JPL
448414	2009 SE_{139}	—	March 13, 2007	Mount Lemmon	Mount Lemmon Survey	·	3.2 km	MPC · JPL
448415	2009 SQ_{139}	—	September 19, 2009	Kitt Peak	Spacewatch	·	3.6 km	MPC · JPL
448416	2009 SK_{152}	—	August 17, 2009	Catalina	CSS	·	2.3 km	MPC · JPL
448417	2009 SQ_{157}	—	September 20, 2009	Kitt Peak	Spacewatch	·	2.8 km	MPC · JPL
448418	2009 SA_{168}	—	August 29, 2009	Kitt Peak	Spacewatch	·	3.6 km	MPC · JPL
448419	2009 SP_{207}	—	December 10, 2004	Socorro	LINEAR	·	4.2 km	MPC · JPL
448420	2009 SZ_{220}	—	September 25, 2009	La Sagra	OAM	·	4.4 km	MPC · JPL
448421	2009 SD_{255}	—	April 6, 2008	Kitt Peak	Spacewatch	·	3.6 km	MPC · JPL
448422	2009 SJ_{255}	—	September 16, 2009	Siding Spring	SSS	·	3.9 km	MPC · JPL
448423	2009 SG_{270}	—	September 24, 2009	Kitt Peak	Spacewatch	·	4.7 km	MPC · JPL
448424	2009 SY_{273}	—	September 25, 2009	Kitt Peak	Spacewatch	·	3.9 km	MPC · JPL
448425	2009 SV_{279}	—	September 17, 2009	Kitt Peak	Spacewatch	·	3.4 km	MPC · JPL
448426	2009 SY_{346}	—	September 25, 2009	Kitt Peak	Spacewatch	·	2.9 km	MPC · JPL
448427	2009 UZ_{51}	—	October 22, 2009	Mount Lemmon	Mount Lemmon Survey	·	510 m	MPC · JPL
448428	2009 UF_{82}	—	October 22, 2009	Catalina	CSS	·	710 m	MPC · JPL
448429	2009 UK_{105}	—	October 25, 2009	Kitt Peak	Spacewatch	CYB	3.2 km	MPC · JPL
448430	2009 UB_{116}	—	October 21, 2009	Mount Lemmon	Mount Lemmon Survey	VER	2.7 km	MPC · JPL
448431	2009 VV_{48}	—	November 10, 2009	Catalina	CSS	T_{j} (2.98)	4.9 km	MPC · JPL
448432	2009 VJ_{115}	—	November 11, 2009	Socorro	LINEAR	CYB	4.2 km	MPC · JPL
448433	2009 WM_{46}	—	October 11, 2009	Mount Lemmon	Mount Lemmon Survey	·	2.7 km	MPC · JPL
448434	2009 WA_{72}	—	October 25, 2009	Kitt Peak	Spacewatch	·	680 m	MPC · JPL
448435	2009 WM_{76}	—	November 10, 2009	Kitt Peak	Spacewatch	·	690 m	MPC · JPL
448436	2009 WX_{85}	—	November 19, 2009	Kitt Peak	Spacewatch	·	810 m	MPC · JPL
448437	2009 WS_{86}	—	November 19, 2009	Kitt Peak	Spacewatch	CYB	3.2 km	MPC · JPL
448438	2009 WL_{113}	—	September 20, 2009	Kitt Peak	Spacewatch	·	2.9 km	MPC · JPL
448439	2009 WE_{177}	—	November 11, 2009	Kitt Peak	Spacewatch	·	730 m	MPC · JPL
448440	2009 WU_{235}	—	October 23, 2009	Kitt Peak	Spacewatch	·	640 m	MPC · JPL
448441	2009 WP_{245}	—	November 21, 2009	Mount Lemmon	Mount Lemmon Survey	·	800 m	MPC · JPL
448442	2009 WF_{254}	—	November 17, 2009	Mount Lemmon	Mount Lemmon Survey	·	1.4 km	MPC · JPL
448443	2009 YL_{24}	—	December 17, 2009	Mount Lemmon	Mount Lemmon Survey	·	570 m	MPC · JPL
448444	2010 AP_{96}	—	September 30, 2009	Mount Lemmon	Mount Lemmon Survey	·	3.5 km	MPC · JPL
448445	2010 BU_{74}	—	December 4, 2008	Kitt Peak	Spacewatch	·	2.7 km	MPC · JPL
448446	2010 CL_{183}	—	February 15, 2010	Haleakala	Pan-STARRS 1	·	850 m	MPC · JPL
448447	2010 DA_{45}	—	September 11, 2004	Kitt Peak	Spacewatch	V	800 m	MPC · JPL
448448	2010 DU_{57}	—	February 24, 2010	WISE	WISE	·	2.0 km	MPC · JPL
448449	2010 DX_{75}	—	September 6, 2008	Kitt Peak	Spacewatch	·	640 m	MPC · JPL
448450	2010 DB_{77}	—	February 17, 2010	Catalina	CSS	PHO	1.2 km	MPC · JPL
448451	2010 DX_{77}	—	February 16, 2010	Mount Lemmon	Mount Lemmon Survey	PHO	2.7 km	MPC · JPL
448452	2010 EX_{29}	—	March 5, 2010	Catalina	CSS	·	2.2 km	MPC · JPL
448453	2010 ES_{44}	—	March 13, 2010	Dauban	Kugel, F.	·	1.1 km	MPC · JPL
448454	2010 EW_{70}	—	March 12, 2010	Kitt Peak	Spacewatch	·	1.1 km	MPC · JPL
448455	2010 EG_{71}	—	March 4, 2010	Kitt Peak	Spacewatch	MAS	720 m	MPC · JPL
448456	2010 ET_{79}	—	September 23, 2008	Mount Lemmon	Mount Lemmon Survey	·	660 m	MPC · JPL
448457	2010 EZ_{84}	—	March 13, 2010	Kitt Peak	Spacewatch	·	960 m	MPC · JPL
448458	2010 EC_{87}	—	March 13, 2010	Kitt Peak	Spacewatch	NYS	820 m	MPC · JPL
448459	2010 EY_{107}	—	March 12, 2010	Mount Lemmon	Mount Lemmon Survey	V	850 m	MPC · JPL
448460	2010 EO_{109}	—	March 4, 2010	Kitt Peak	Spacewatch	·	770 m	MPC · JPL
448461	2010 ER_{110}	—	March 12, 2010	Kitt Peak	Spacewatch	·	1.4 km	MPC · JPL
448462	2010 EH_{129}	—	March 12, 2010	Kitt Peak	Spacewatch	·	1.2 km	MPC · JPL
448463	2010 EB_{130}	—	March 13, 2010	Kitt Peak	Spacewatch	·	990 m	MPC · JPL
448464	2010 EK_{137}	—	March 15, 2010	Mount Lemmon	Mount Lemmon Survey	PHO	2.7 km	MPC · JPL
448465	2010 ES_{143}	—	March 13, 2010	Mount Lemmon	Mount Lemmon Survey	·	1.3 km	MPC · JPL
448466	2010 FJ_{20}	—	May 21, 2006	Kitt Peak	Spacewatch	·	1.2 km	MPC · JPL
448467	2010 FQ_{29}	—	March 16, 2010	Kitt Peak	Spacewatch	MAS	780 m	MPC · JPL
448468	2010 FR_{29}	—	March 16, 2010	Kitt Peak	Spacewatch	MAS	710 m	MPC · JPL
448469	2010 FH_{47}	—	February 18, 2010	Mount Lemmon	Mount Lemmon Survey	·	840 m	MPC · JPL
448470	2010 GP_{25}	—	September 19, 2007	Kitt Peak	Spacewatch	·	1.3 km	MPC · JPL
448471	2010 GA_{28}	—	April 6, 2010	Kitt Peak	Spacewatch	PHO	2.2 km	MPC · JPL
448472	2010 GP_{29}	—	April 8, 2010	Mount Lemmon	Mount Lemmon Survey	·	1.5 km	MPC · JPL
448473	2010 GO_{30}	—	April 4, 2010	Kitt Peak	Spacewatch	·	950 m	MPC · JPL
448474	2010 GV_{65}	—	January 22, 2006	Catalina	CSS	·	1.5 km	MPC · JPL
448475	2010 GZ_{97}	—	March 18, 2010	Kitt Peak	Spacewatch	·	1.3 km	MPC · JPL
448476	2010 GJ_{103}	—	April 6, 2010	Kitt Peak	Spacewatch	EUN	1.0 km	MPC · JPL
448477	2010 GG_{107}	—	April 8, 2010	Kitt Peak	Spacewatch	·	810 m	MPC · JPL
448478	2010 GM_{112}	—	April 10, 2010	Kitt Peak	Spacewatch	·	1.9 km	MPC · JPL
448479	2010 GU_{119}	—	April 11, 2010	Mount Lemmon	Mount Lemmon Survey	·	1.5 km	MPC · JPL
448480	2010 GZ_{141}	—	March 12, 2010	Kitt Peak	Spacewatch	V	610 m	MPC · JPL
448481	2010 GM_{145}	—	September 10, 2007	Mount Lemmon	Mount Lemmon Survey	·	1.5 km	MPC · JPL
448482	2010 HJ_{55}	—	April 25, 2010	WISE	WISE	·	2.1 km	MPC · JPL
448483	2010 JP_{45}	—	May 7, 2010	Kitt Peak	Spacewatch	(5)	1.1 km	MPC · JPL
448484	2010 JQ_{68}	—	May 9, 2010	WISE	WISE	·	3.5 km	MPC · JPL
448485	2010 JR_{73}	—	November 16, 2003	Kitt Peak	Spacewatch	·	1.3 km	MPC · JPL
448486	2010 JU_{73}	—	May 8, 2010	Mount Lemmon	Mount Lemmon Survey	NYS	1.2 km	MPC · JPL
448487	2010 JN_{75}	—	May 4, 2010	Kitt Peak	Spacewatch	·	1.2 km	MPC · JPL
448488	2010 JG_{78}	—	November 7, 2007	Kitt Peak	Spacewatch	AEO	1.3 km	MPC · JPL
448489	2010 JS_{80}	—	April 9, 2010	Mount Lemmon	Mount Lemmon Survey	·	1.2 km	MPC · JPL
448490	2010 JG_{120}	—	November 4, 2007	Kitt Peak	Spacewatch	·	1.7 km	MPC · JPL
448491	2010 JM_{135}	—	May 14, 2010	WISE	WISE	·	3.3 km	MPC · JPL
448492	2010 JQ_{153}	—	April 9, 2010	Kitt Peak	Spacewatch	·	1.8 km	MPC · JPL
448493	2010 JV_{154}	—	November 18, 2003	Kitt Peak	Spacewatch	·	1.8 km	MPC · JPL
448494	2010 KY_{9}	—	May 13, 2010	Kitt Peak	Spacewatch	MAR	1.0 km	MPC · JPL
448495	2010 KD_{49}	—	May 22, 2010	WISE	WISE	·	1.8 km	MPC · JPL
448496	2010 KX_{119}	—	May 30, 2010	WISE	WISE	·	2.2 km	MPC · JPL
448497	2010 KR_{128}	—	May 19, 2010	Mount Lemmon	Mount Lemmon Survey	·	1.4 km	MPC · JPL
448498	2010 LK_{31}	—	June 6, 2010	WISE	WISE	·	1.9 km	MPC · JPL
448499	2010 LE_{35}	—	May 11, 2010	Mount Lemmon	Mount Lemmon Survey	·	1.6 km	MPC · JPL
448500	2010 LM_{77}	—	June 10, 2010	WISE	WISE	·	2.8 km	MPC · JPL

== 448501–448600 ==
back to top

Designation			Discovery			Properties		Ref
Permanent	Provisional	Named after	Date	Site	Discoverer(s)	Category	Diam.	Ref
448501	2010 LO_{82}	—	June 11, 2010	WISE	WISE	·	2.8 km	MPC · JPL
448502	2010 LZ_{112}	—	June 15, 2010	Kitt Peak	Spacewatch	·	3.0 km	MPC · JPL
448503	2010 LW_{116}	—	June 14, 2010	WISE	WISE	DOR	2.7 km	MPC · JPL
448504	2010 LE_{119}	—	June 14, 2010	WISE	WISE	·	3.1 km	MPC · JPL
448505	2010 MJ_{4}	—	June 20, 2010	Mount Lemmon	Mount Lemmon Survey	·	1.8 km	MPC · JPL
448506	2010 MZ_{45}	—	June 23, 2010	WISE	WISE	·	2.1 km	MPC · JPL
448507	2010 MY_{82}	—	June 27, 2010	WISE	WISE	HOF	2.7 km	MPC · JPL
448508	2010 MX_{84}	—	June 27, 2010	WISE	WISE	·	3.4 km	MPC · JPL
448509	2010 ME_{100}	—	June 29, 2010	WISE	WISE	EOS	3.1 km	MPC · JPL
448510	2010 MF_{102}	—	June 29, 2010	WISE	WISE	·	3.8 km	MPC · JPL
448511	2010 NU_{13}	—	July 5, 2010	WISE	WISE	·	3.4 km	MPC · JPL
448512	2010 NT_{16}	—	October 7, 2005	Kitt Peak	Spacewatch	·	2.6 km	MPC · JPL
448513	2010 NU_{45}	—	July 9, 2010	WISE	WISE	·	1.7 km	MPC · JPL
448514	2010 NV_{46}	—	July 9, 2010	WISE	WISE	·	2.8 km	MPC · JPL
448515	2010 NH_{56}	—	July 10, 2010	WISE	WISE	·	2.6 km	MPC · JPL
448516	2010 OG_{3}	—	July 16, 2010	WISE	WISE	·	3.0 km	MPC · JPL
448517	2010 OP_{10}	—	July 16, 2010	WISE	WISE	HYG	2.7 km	MPC · JPL
448518	2010 OV_{15}	—	July 17, 2010	WISE	WISE	·	4.4 km	MPC · JPL
448519	2010 ON_{23}	—	July 18, 2010	WISE	WISE	·	4.0 km	MPC · JPL
448520	2010 OA_{43}	—	July 21, 2010	WISE	WISE	EMA	3.4 km	MPC · JPL
448521	2010 OL_{49}	—	July 22, 2010	WISE	WISE	·	2.1 km	MPC · JPL
448522	2010 OU_{50}	—	April 4, 2008	Mount Lemmon	Mount Lemmon Survey	·	3.5 km	MPC · JPL
448523	2010 OM_{59}	—	July 23, 2010	WISE	WISE	·	3.2 km	MPC · JPL
448524	2010 OO_{73}	—	July 25, 2010	WISE	WISE	·	4.7 km	MPC · JPL
448525	2010 OM_{89}	—	July 27, 2010	WISE	WISE	·	4.5 km	MPC · JPL
448526	2010 OJ_{93}	—	October 10, 2005	Kitt Peak	Spacewatch	TRE	2.7 km	MPC · JPL
448527	2010 OO_{99}	—	October 8, 2004	Kitt Peak	Spacewatch	·	3.1 km	MPC · JPL
448528	2010 OO_{110}	—	November 18, 2006	Mount Lemmon	Mount Lemmon Survey	·	3.6 km	MPC · JPL
448529	2010 OO_{111}	—	July 29, 2010	WISE	WISE	·	2.8 km	MPC · JPL
448530	2010 PK_{2}	—	August 2, 2010	Socorro	LINEAR	·	2.2 km	MPC · JPL
448531	2010 PL_{10}	—	August 4, 2010	Socorro	LINEAR	·	2.8 km	MPC · JPL
448532	2010 PT_{10}	—	August 4, 2010	Socorro	LINEAR	·	2.6 km	MPC · JPL
448533	2010 PD_{33}	—	January 3, 2009	Kitt Peak	Spacewatch	·	2.7 km	MPC · JPL
448534	2010 PP_{33}	—	December 21, 2006	Mount Lemmon	Mount Lemmon Survey	·	2.4 km	MPC · JPL
448535	2010 PY_{36}	—	August 6, 2010	WISE	WISE	·	3.9 km	MPC · JPL
448536	2010 PP_{51}	—	August 7, 2010	WISE	WISE	·	4.3 km	MPC · JPL
448537	2010 PV_{60}	—	August 10, 2010	Kitt Peak	Spacewatch	·	2.0 km	MPC · JPL
448538	2010 PO_{68}	—	August 9, 2010	WISE	WISE	·	3.2 km	MPC · JPL
448539	2010 PW_{70}	—	August 10, 2010	WISE	WISE	·	3.9 km	MPC · JPL
448540	2010 PZ_{79}	—	June 8, 2005	Kitt Peak	Spacewatch	·	2.3 km	MPC · JPL
448541	2010 RL_{10}	—	March 27, 2008	Mount Lemmon	Mount Lemmon Survey	AGN	1 km	MPC · JPL
448542	2010 RN_{11}	—	April 13, 2004	Kitt Peak	Spacewatch	·	1.7 km	MPC · JPL
448543	2010 RM_{12}	—	February 21, 2007	Mount Lemmon	Mount Lemmon Survey	·	4.0 km	MPC · JPL
448544	2010 RQ_{13}	—	September 1, 2010	Mount Lemmon	Mount Lemmon Survey	·	2.0 km	MPC · JPL
448545	2010 RV_{36}	—	September 2, 2010	Socorro	LINEAR	H	610 m	MPC · JPL
448546	2010 RH_{57}	—	November 25, 2006	Kitt Peak	Spacewatch	·	2.1 km	MPC · JPL
448547	2010 RF_{61}	—	February 8, 2008	Mount Lemmon	Mount Lemmon Survey	·	1.9 km	MPC · JPL
448548	2010 RJ_{61}	—	September 6, 2010	Kitt Peak	Spacewatch	EOS	1.6 km	MPC · JPL
448549	2010 RU_{67}	—	September 5, 2010	Mount Lemmon	Mount Lemmon Survey	·	1.8 km	MPC · JPL
448550	2010 RQ_{73}	—	September 20, 2001	Kitt Peak	Spacewatch	·	2.3 km	MPC · JPL
448551	2010 RT_{83}	—	February 10, 2008	Mount Lemmon	Mount Lemmon Survey	·	1.8 km	MPC · JPL
448552	2010 RZ_{91}	—	July 11, 2005	Kitt Peak	Spacewatch	·	1.8 km	MPC · JPL
448553	2010 RJ_{100}	—	February 22, 2007	Kitt Peak	Spacewatch	·	2.0 km	MPC · JPL
448554	2010 RM_{102}	—	September 10, 2010	Kitt Peak	Spacewatch	AGN	950 m	MPC · JPL
448555	2010 RY_{105}	—	September 10, 2010	Kitt Peak	Spacewatch	·	2.2 km	MPC · JPL
448556	2010 RQ_{108}	—	September 10, 2010	Mount Lemmon	Mount Lemmon Survey	·	1.9 km	MPC · JPL
448557	2010 RT_{108}	—	September 11, 2010	Kitt Peak	Spacewatch	BRA	1.5 km	MPC · JPL
448558	2010 RD_{118}	—	September 11, 2010	Kitt Peak	Spacewatch	·	1.9 km	MPC · JPL
448559	2010 RD_{124}	—	September 11, 2010	Mount Lemmon	Mount Lemmon Survey	·	1.8 km	MPC · JPL
448560	2010 RZ_{124}	—	December 9, 2006	Kitt Peak	Spacewatch	KOR	1.5 km	MPC · JPL
448561	2010 RN_{128}	—	September 14, 2010	Kitt Peak	Spacewatch	·	2.4 km	MPC · JPL
448562	2010 RZ_{143}	—	September 26, 1998	Socorro	LINEAR	·	460 m	MPC · JPL
448563	2010 RO_{150}	—	September 15, 2010	Kitt Peak	Spacewatch	GEF	1.3 km	MPC · JPL
448564	2010 RC_{151}	—	September 15, 2010	Kitt Peak	Spacewatch	·	2.0 km	MPC · JPL
448565	2010 RY_{151}	—	September 15, 2010	Kitt Peak	Spacewatch	KOR	1.4 km	MPC · JPL
448566	2010 RP_{152}	—	April 3, 2008	Mount Lemmon	Mount Lemmon Survey	·	1.7 km	MPC · JPL
448567	2010 RB_{174}	—	October 9, 2005	Kitt Peak	Spacewatch	·	1.8 km	MPC · JPL
448568	2010 SL_{2}	—	September 16, 2010	Mount Lemmon	Mount Lemmon Survey	·	1.9 km	MPC · JPL
448569	2010 SR_{5}	—	September 16, 2010	Kitt Peak	Spacewatch	·	2.1 km	MPC · JPL
448570	2010 SL_{7}	—	February 3, 2008	Kitt Peak	Spacewatch	·	3.3 km	MPC · JPL
448571	2010 SZ_{14}	—	September 12, 2005	Kitt Peak	Spacewatch	KOR	1.5 km	MPC · JPL
448572	2010 SB_{18}	—	October 9, 1994	Kitt Peak	Spacewatch	·	2.1 km	MPC · JPL
448573	2010 SJ_{24}	—	March 27, 2008	Mount Lemmon	Mount Lemmon Survey	·	2.8 km	MPC · JPL
448574	2010 ST_{40}	—	August 28, 2005	Kitt Peak	Spacewatch	AGN	1.2 km	MPC · JPL
448575	2010 TA_{9}	—	September 13, 2005	Kitt Peak	Spacewatch	KOR	1.3 km	MPC · JPL
448576	2010 TH_{12}	—	September 19, 2010	Kitt Peak	Spacewatch	·	1.7 km	MPC · JPL
448577	2010 TG_{17}	—	October 3, 2010	Kitt Peak	Spacewatch	BRA	1.3 km	MPC · JPL
448578	2010 TC_{18}	—	September 15, 2010	Mount Lemmon	Mount Lemmon Survey	·	2.5 km	MPC · JPL
448579	2010 TD_{18}	—	September 13, 2005	Kitt Peak	Spacewatch	·	1.6 km	MPC · JPL
448580	2010 TV_{19}	—	March 29, 2008	Mount Lemmon	Mount Lemmon Survey	·	2.9 km	MPC · JPL
448581	2010 TE_{22}	—	August 30, 2005	Kitt Peak	Spacewatch	KOR	1.3 km	MPC · JPL
448582	2010 TG_{28}	—	September 2, 2010	Mount Lemmon	Mount Lemmon Survey	·	1.6 km	MPC · JPL
448583	2010 TQ_{38}	—	June 14, 2010	WISE	WISE	BRA	1.7 km	MPC · JPL
448584	2010 TE_{44}	—	September 9, 2010	Kitt Peak	Spacewatch	NAE	1.7 km	MPC · JPL
448585	2010 TU_{44}	—	October 3, 2010	Kitt Peak	Spacewatch	·	2.4 km	MPC · JPL
448586	2010 TC_{53}	—	October 5, 2005	Mount Lemmon	Mount Lemmon Survey	KOR	1.2 km	MPC · JPL
448587	2010 TA_{68}	—	September 29, 2005	Mount Lemmon	Mount Lemmon Survey	·	2.0 km	MPC · JPL
448588	2010 TR_{71}	—	May 2, 2008	Kitt Peak	Spacewatch	·	2.3 km	MPC · JPL
448589	2010 TK_{77}	—	September 17, 2010	Kitt Peak	Spacewatch	BRA	1.4 km	MPC · JPL
448590	2010 TH_{82}	—	October 1, 2010	Mount Lemmon	Mount Lemmon Survey	BRA	1.6 km	MPC · JPL
448591	2010 TC_{90}	—	March 31, 2008	Mount Lemmon	Mount Lemmon Survey	KOR	1.1 km	MPC · JPL
448592	2010 TA_{95}	—	September 1, 2005	Kitt Peak	Spacewatch	KOR	1.1 km	MPC · JPL
448593	2010 TU_{96}	—	February 28, 2008	Mount Lemmon	Mount Lemmon Survey	KOR	1.5 km	MPC · JPL
448594	2010 TH_{99}	—	September 11, 2010	Kitt Peak	Spacewatch	THM	1.8 km	MPC · JPL
448595	2010 TR_{101}	—	October 9, 2005	Kitt Peak	Spacewatch	·	1.9 km	MPC · JPL
448596	2010 TW_{114}	—	August 21, 2004	Siding Spring	SSS	·	3.1 km	MPC · JPL
448597	2010 TU_{124}	—	September 25, 2005	Kitt Peak	Spacewatch	·	1.5 km	MPC · JPL
448598	2010 TT_{143}	—	October 11, 2010	Mount Lemmon	Mount Lemmon Survey	·	1.7 km	MPC · JPL
448599	2010 TZ_{145}	—	March 15, 2008	Kitt Peak	Spacewatch	·	3.0 km	MPC · JPL
448600	2010 TH_{146}	—	September 16, 2010	Mount Lemmon	Mount Lemmon Survey	·	2.0 km	MPC · JPL

== 448601–448700 ==
back to top

Designation			Discovery			Properties		Ref
Permanent	Provisional	Named after	Date	Site	Discoverer(s)	Category	Diam.	Ref
448601	2010 TM_{156}	—	September 10, 2010	Mount Lemmon	Mount Lemmon Survey	·	2.6 km	MPC · JPL
448602	2010 TQ_{168}	—	March 14, 2004	Kitt Peak	Spacewatch	H	470 m	MPC · JPL
448603	2010 TN_{180}	—	October 3, 2010	Kitt Peak	Spacewatch	·	1.9 km	MPC · JPL
448604	2010 UX_{9}	—	October 24, 2005	Kitt Peak	Spacewatch	·	1.7 km	MPC · JPL
448605	2010 UK_{14}	—	October 27, 2005	Mount Lemmon	Mount Lemmon Survey	KOR	980 m	MPC · JPL
448606	2010 UG_{25}	—	April 24, 2003	Kitt Peak	Spacewatch	·	3.0 km	MPC · JPL
448607	2010 UA_{31}	—	December 1, 2005	Mount Lemmon	Mount Lemmon Survey	·	2.4 km	MPC · JPL
448608	2010 UT_{34}	—	October 29, 2005	Catalina	CSS	·	2.0 km	MPC · JPL
448609	2010 UE_{36}	—	October 29, 2010	Mount Lemmon	Mount Lemmon Survey	·	2.7 km	MPC · JPL
448610	2010 UT_{36}	—	July 27, 2009	Kitt Peak	Spacewatch	·	2.7 km	MPC · JPL
448611	2010 UG_{45}	—	October 13, 2010	Mount Lemmon	Mount Lemmon Survey	·	2.2 km	MPC · JPL
448612	2010 UH_{47}	—	September 16, 2010	Mount Lemmon	Mount Lemmon Survey	·	2.7 km	MPC · JPL
448613	2010 UX_{52}	—	December 30, 2005	Kitt Peak	Spacewatch	·	2.7 km	MPC · JPL
448614	2010 UL_{53}	—	August 12, 2010	Kitt Peak	Spacewatch	·	3.2 km	MPC · JPL
448615	2010 UK_{57}	—	March 20, 2007	Mount Lemmon	Mount Lemmon Survey	·	2.3 km	MPC · JPL
448616	2010 UW_{58}	—	October 29, 2010	Kitt Peak	Spacewatch	·	4.0 km	MPC · JPL
448617	2010 UB_{63}	—	October 30, 2010	Catalina	CSS	·	3.9 km	MPC · JPL
448618	2010 UN_{67}	—	October 14, 2010	Mount Lemmon	Mount Lemmon Survey	·	2.0 km	MPC · JPL
448619	2010 UL_{70}	—	October 12, 1999	Socorro	LINEAR	·	3.2 km	MPC · JPL
448620	2010 UF_{71}	—	October 29, 2010	Kitt Peak	Spacewatch	EOS	2.0 km	MPC · JPL
448621	2010 UN_{75}	—	September 11, 2010	Mount Lemmon	Mount Lemmon Survey	·	3.6 km	MPC · JPL
448622	2010 UE_{78}	—	December 3, 2005	Kitt Peak	Spacewatch	·	2.7 km	MPC · JPL
448623	2010 UJ_{88}	—	October 9, 2004	Socorro	LINEAR	·	3.3 km	MPC · JPL
448624	2010 UY_{89}	—	September 18, 2010	Mount Lemmon	Mount Lemmon Survey	·	2.1 km	MPC · JPL
448625	2010 UE_{91}	—	October 17, 2010	Mount Lemmon	Mount Lemmon Survey	VER	2.6 km	MPC · JPL
448626	2010 UZ_{94}	—	October 30, 2005	Mount Lemmon	Mount Lemmon Survey	·	2.3 km	MPC · JPL
448627	2010 UP_{101}	—	April 15, 2008	Mount Lemmon	Mount Lemmon Survey	EOS	2.0 km	MPC · JPL
448628	2010 VF_{1}	—	November 2, 2010	Haleakala	Pan-STARRS 1	APO	310 m	MPC · JPL
448629	2010 VH_{16}	—	October 12, 2010	Mount Lemmon	Mount Lemmon Survey	·	2.2 km	MPC · JPL
448630	2010 VB_{19}	—	December 4, 2005	Catalina	CSS	H	710 m	MPC · JPL
448631	2010 VR_{22}	—	November 1, 2010	Kitt Peak	Spacewatch	·	2.8 km	MPC · JPL
448632	2010 VR_{28}	—	August 9, 2010	WISE	WISE	·	4.0 km	MPC · JPL
448633	2010 VT_{37}	—	November 29, 2005	Kitt Peak	Spacewatch	·	3.1 km	MPC · JPL
448634	2010 VF_{46}	—	October 13, 2010	Mount Lemmon	Mount Lemmon Survey	·	3.4 km	MPC · JPL
448635	2010 VP_{52}	—	October 26, 1994	Kitt Peak	Spacewatch	·	1.8 km	MPC · JPL
448636	2010 VD_{57}	—	October 29, 2005	Mount Lemmon	Mount Lemmon Survey	·	1.4 km	MPC · JPL
448637	2010 VG_{65}	—	October 13, 2010	Mount Lemmon	Mount Lemmon Survey	·	3.0 km	MPC · JPL
448638	2010 VG_{70}	—	October 29, 2010	Mount Lemmon	Mount Lemmon Survey	·	2.1 km	MPC · JPL
448639	2010 VZ_{74}	—	October 9, 2010	Mount Lemmon	Mount Lemmon Survey	EOS	1.9 km	MPC · JPL
448640	2010 VW_{82}	—	March 19, 2007	Mount Lemmon	Mount Lemmon Survey	·	2.4 km	MPC · JPL
448641	2010 VD_{83}	—	October 29, 2010	Mount Lemmon	Mount Lemmon Survey	·	3.6 km	MPC · JPL
448642	2010 VK_{84}	—	May 2, 2003	Kitt Peak	Spacewatch	·	3.2 km	MPC · JPL
448643	2010 VH_{85}	—	December 28, 2005	Mount Lemmon	Mount Lemmon Survey	·	2.3 km	MPC · JPL
448644	2010 VU_{87}	—	November 6, 2010	Kitt Peak	Spacewatch	·	2.2 km	MPC · JPL
448645	2010 VV_{95}	—	October 29, 2010	Kitt Peak	Spacewatch	·	2.3 km	MPC · JPL
448646	2010 VO_{96}	—	December 21, 2005	Kitt Peak	Spacewatch	·	1.9 km	MPC · JPL
448647	2010 VP_{101}	—	September 15, 2004	Kitt Peak	Spacewatch	THM	1.9 km	MPC · JPL
448648	2010 VA_{102}	—	November 5, 2010	Kitt Peak	Spacewatch	·	3.1 km	MPC · JPL
448649	2010 VK_{103}	—	November 5, 2010	Kitt Peak	Spacewatch	·	1.7 km	MPC · JPL
448650	2010 VD_{104}	—	January 5, 2006	Kitt Peak	Spacewatch	·	2.5 km	MPC · JPL
448651	2010 VW_{106}	—	November 21, 2005	Kitt Peak	Spacewatch	·	3.0 km	MPC · JPL
448652	2010 VK_{110}	—	October 12, 2010	Mount Lemmon	Mount Lemmon Survey	·	1.9 km	MPC · JPL
448653	2010 VM_{112}	—	November 7, 2010	Kitt Peak	Spacewatch	·	2.2 km	MPC · JPL
448654	2010 VG_{119}	—	October 31, 1999	Kitt Peak	Spacewatch	·	1.9 km	MPC · JPL
448655	2010 VD_{130}	—	October 14, 2010	Mount Lemmon	Mount Lemmon Survey	·	3.9 km	MPC · JPL
448656	2010 VX_{131}	—	November 21, 2005	Kitt Peak	Spacewatch	·	2.4 km	MPC · JPL
448657	2010 VA_{132}	—	October 28, 1994	Kitt Peak	Spacewatch	·	2.6 km	MPC · JPL
448658	2010 VV_{147}	—	November 6, 2010	Mount Lemmon	Mount Lemmon Survey	EOS	2.1 km	MPC · JPL
448659	2010 VG_{152}	—	June 23, 2009	Mount Lemmon	Mount Lemmon Survey	·	2.0 km	MPC · JPL
448660	2010 VM_{152}	—	November 6, 2010	Mount Lemmon	Mount Lemmon Survey	EOS	1.9 km	MPC · JPL
448661	2010 VL_{163}	—	October 13, 2010	Mount Lemmon	Mount Lemmon Survey	·	3.1 km	MPC · JPL
448662	2010 VB_{165}	—	September 7, 2004	Kitt Peak	Spacewatch	·	2.2 km	MPC · JPL
448663	2010 VB_{170}	—	November 10, 2010	Mount Lemmon	Mount Lemmon Survey	·	3.2 km	MPC · JPL
448664	2010 VW_{177}	—	May 11, 2002	Socorro	LINEAR	·	3.3 km	MPC · JPL
448665	2010 VO_{178}	—	September 12, 2004	Kitt Peak	Spacewatch	·	2.1 km	MPC · JPL
448666	2010 VU_{178}	—	October 17, 1999	Kitt Peak	Spacewatch	·	2.1 km	MPC · JPL
448667	2010 VP_{179}	—	December 1, 2005	Mount Lemmon	Mount Lemmon Survey	EOS	1.6 km	MPC · JPL
448668	2010 VH_{181}	—	November 11, 2010	Mount Lemmon	Mount Lemmon Survey	·	3.7 km	MPC · JPL
448669	2010 VO_{184}	—	April 27, 2008	Mount Lemmon	Mount Lemmon Survey	·	2.1 km	MPC · JPL
448670	2010 VT_{190}	—	December 8, 2005	Kitt Peak	Spacewatch	EOS	1.8 km	MPC · JPL
448671	2010 VL_{192}	—	March 11, 2007	Kitt Peak	Spacewatch	·	2.2 km	MPC · JPL
448672	2010 VN_{193}	—	October 3, 1999	Kitt Peak	Spacewatch	·	1.9 km	MPC · JPL
448673	2010 VJ_{197}	—	January 21, 2010	WISE	WISE	·	2.9 km	MPC · JPL
448674	2010 VN_{203}	—	October 17, 2010	Mount Lemmon	Mount Lemmon Survey	·	2.9 km	MPC · JPL
448675	2010 VY_{204}	—	September 3, 2010	Mount Lemmon	Mount Lemmon Survey	EOS	2.0 km	MPC · JPL
448676	2010 VH_{208}	—	October 27, 2005	Mount Lemmon	Mount Lemmon Survey	·	1.7 km	MPC · JPL
448677	2010 VR_{208}	—	October 17, 2010	Mount Lemmon	Mount Lemmon Survey	·	3.6 km	MPC · JPL
448678	2010 VO_{210}	—	October 31, 2010	Mount Lemmon	Mount Lemmon Survey	615	1.3 km	MPC · JPL
448679	2010 VU_{219}	—	May 27, 2008	Mount Lemmon	Mount Lemmon Survey	·	2.5 km	MPC · JPL
448680	2010 WV	—	October 29, 2010	Mount Lemmon	Mount Lemmon Survey	EOS	1.9 km	MPC · JPL
448681	2010 WF_{4}	—	May 5, 2008	Mount Lemmon	Mount Lemmon Survey	EOS	1.9 km	MPC · JPL
448682	2010 WV_{9}	—	September 11, 2010	Mount Lemmon	Mount Lemmon Survey	·	1.8 km	MPC · JPL
448683	2010 WB_{13}	—	December 25, 2005	Mount Lemmon	Mount Lemmon Survey	·	1.8 km	MPC · JPL
448684	2010 WY_{31}	—	November 11, 2010	Mount Lemmon	Mount Lemmon Survey	·	3.2 km	MPC · JPL
448685	2010 WH_{33}	—	November 27, 2010	Mount Lemmon	Mount Lemmon Survey	·	1.4 km	MPC · JPL
448686	2010 WP_{36}	—	November 14, 1999	Socorro	LINEAR	·	2.8 km	MPC · JPL
448687	2010 WB_{37}	—	October 29, 2010	Kitt Peak	Spacewatch	·	3.1 km	MPC · JPL
448688	2010 WH_{41}	—	November 3, 2010	Kitt Peak	Spacewatch	·	4.5 km	MPC · JPL
448689	2010 WN_{47}	—	November 27, 2010	Mount Lemmon	Mount Lemmon Survey	THM	2.0 km	MPC · JPL
448690	2010 WM_{58}	—	November 12, 1999	Kitt Peak	Spacewatch	·	1.7 km	MPC · JPL
448691	2010 WC_{64}	—	November 6, 2010	Mount Lemmon	Mount Lemmon Survey	·	3.2 km	MPC · JPL
448692	2010 WP_{71}	—	February 25, 2006	Anderson Mesa	LONEOS	·	4.0 km	MPC · JPL
448693	2010 XO_{2}	—	September 12, 2004	Kitt Peak	Spacewatch	·	2.6 km	MPC · JPL
448694	2010 XP_{8}	—	December 26, 2005	Kitt Peak	Spacewatch	·	3.0 km	MPC · JPL
448695	2010 XQ_{22}	—	November 5, 2010	Kitt Peak	Spacewatch	·	3.9 km	MPC · JPL
448696	2010 XK_{23}	—	March 9, 2007	Mount Lemmon	Mount Lemmon Survey	EOS	1.7 km	MPC · JPL
448697	2010 XV_{26}	—	November 9, 2004	Catalina	CSS	·	4.1 km	MPC · JPL
448698	2010 XX_{31}	—	December 2, 2010	Mount Lemmon	Mount Lemmon Survey	·	2.6 km	MPC · JPL
448699	2010 XP_{32}	—	December 22, 2005	Kitt Peak	Spacewatch	·	2.5 km	MPC · JPL
448700	2010 XQ_{33}	—	October 31, 2010	Kitt Peak	Spacewatch	·	2.0 km	MPC · JPL

== 448701–448800 ==
back to top

Designation			Discovery			Properties		Ref
Permanent	Provisional	Named after	Date	Site	Discoverer(s)	Category	Diam.	Ref
448701	2010 XW_{35}	—	November 8, 2010	Kitt Peak	Spacewatch	·	3.2 km	MPC · JPL
448702	2010 XQ_{44}	—	October 13, 2005	Kitt Peak	Spacewatch	·	3.5 km	MPC · JPL
448703	2010 XB_{47}	—	January 27, 2006	Mount Lemmon	Mount Lemmon Survey	THM	2.1 km	MPC · JPL
448704	2010 XK_{50}	—	October 5, 2004	Kitt Peak	Spacewatch	THM	2.3 km	MPC · JPL
448705	2010 XP_{57}	—	September 15, 2009	Mount Lemmon	Mount Lemmon Survey	LIX	3.5 km	MPC · JPL
448706	2010 XQ_{58}	—	August 11, 2004	Siding Spring	SSS	·	3.4 km	MPC · JPL
448707	2010 XV_{76}	—	February 24, 2006	Kitt Peak	Spacewatch	CYB	2.5 km	MPC · JPL
448708	2010 XT_{79}	—	January 10, 2006	Mount Lemmon	Mount Lemmon Survey	·	1.5 km	MPC · JPL
448709	2010 XP_{83}	—	October 10, 2004	Socorro	LINEAR	·	3.3 km	MPC · JPL
448710	2010 XV_{87}	—	May 3, 2008	Mount Lemmon	Mount Lemmon Survey	THM	1.9 km	MPC · JPL
448711	2010 YT_{3}	—	November 8, 2010	Mount Lemmon	Mount Lemmon Survey	·	3.4 km	MPC · JPL
448712	2011 AU_{10}	—	December 10, 2010	Mount Lemmon	Mount Lemmon Survey	·	3.2 km	MPC · JPL
448713	2011 AJ_{23}	—	December 10, 2010	Mount Lemmon	Mount Lemmon Survey	·	3.1 km	MPC · JPL
448714	2011 AY_{24}	—	July 3, 2003	Kitt Peak	Spacewatch	·	3.9 km	MPC · JPL
448715	2011 AR_{38}	—	December 13, 2010	Catalina	CSS	·	2.8 km	MPC · JPL
448716	2011 AN_{65}	—	January 12, 2010	WISE	WISE	·	3.4 km	MPC · JPL
448717	2011 AU_{70}	—	January 14, 2011	Mount Lemmon	Mount Lemmon Survey	·	2.5 km	MPC · JPL
448718	2011 AL_{72}	—	January 18, 2010	WISE	WISE	·	3.7 km	MPC · JPL
448719	2011 AA_{76}	—	December 11, 2004	Kitt Peak	Spacewatch	·	2.7 km	MPC · JPL
448720	2011 BE_{19}	—	December 14, 2010	Catalina	CSS	T_{j} (2.99)	4.2 km	MPC · JPL
448721	2011 BN_{24}	—	January 28, 2011	Mount Lemmon	Mount Lemmon Survey	APO · PHA · critical	230 m	MPC · JPL
448722	2011 BZ_{26}	—	September 19, 2009	Catalina	CSS	·	3.5 km	MPC · JPL
448723	2011 BX_{30}	—	January 17, 2010	WISE	WISE	·	2.8 km	MPC · JPL
448724	2011 BB_{45}	—	January 30, 2011	Haleakala	Pan-STARRS 1	AMO	440 m	MPC · JPL
448725	2011 BS_{50}	—	January 14, 2010	WISE	WISE	·	3.7 km	MPC · JPL
448726	2011 BW_{55}	—	January 2, 2011	Catalina	CSS	·	3.4 km	MPC · JPL
448727	2011 BT_{80}	—	December 5, 2010	Mount Lemmon	Mount Lemmon Survey	LIX	4.0 km	MPC · JPL
448728	2011 BC_{107}	—	February 27, 2006	Mount Lemmon	Mount Lemmon Survey	·	2.9 km	MPC · JPL
448729	2011 BU_{117}	—	November 3, 2010	Mount Lemmon	Mount Lemmon Survey	LIX	3.6 km	MPC · JPL
448730	2011 BN_{153}	—	October 19, 2010	Mount Lemmon	Mount Lemmon Survey	EOS	2.2 km	MPC · JPL
448731	2011 DQ_{24}	—	September 13, 2004	Socorro	LINEAR	H	580 m	MPC · JPL
448732	2011 EJ_{18}	—	February 2, 2000	Socorro	LINEAR	·	2.2 km	MPC · JPL
448733	2011 EN_{37}	—	February 16, 2004	Kitt Peak	Spacewatch	·	740 m	MPC · JPL
448734	2011 EJ_{45}	—	April 29, 2008	Mount Lemmon	Mount Lemmon Survey	·	870 m	MPC · JPL
448735	2011 EK_{82}	—	October 3, 2003	Kitt Peak	Spacewatch	·	2.3 km	MPC · JPL
448736	2011 FY_{13}	—	September 29, 2005	Kitt Peak	Spacewatch	·	590 m	MPC · JPL
448737	2011 HS_{11}	—	April 13, 2011	Mount Lemmon	Mount Lemmon Survey	·	640 m	MPC · JPL
448738	2011 HD_{23}	—	December 16, 2006	Kitt Peak	Spacewatch	·	1.1 km	MPC · JPL
448739	2011 HD_{30}	—	October 3, 2005	Kitt Peak	Spacewatch	·	620 m	MPC · JPL
448740	2011 HX_{83}	—	April 1, 2011	Kitt Peak	Spacewatch	·	810 m	MPC · JPL
448741	2011 HT_{84}	—	April 30, 2011	Mount Lemmon	Mount Lemmon Survey	·	760 m	MPC · JPL
448742	2011 JP_{2}	—	October 19, 2003	Kitt Peak	Spacewatch	T_{j} (2.8)	5.6 km	MPC · JPL
448743	2011 JK_{4}	—	July 30, 2008	Kitt Peak	Spacewatch	·	810 m	MPC · JPL
448744	2011 JG_{16}	—	March 29, 2011	Kitt Peak	Spacewatch	·	610 m	MPC · JPL
448745	2011 JF_{26}	—	April 13, 2011	Mount Lemmon	Mount Lemmon Survey	·	650 m	MPC · JPL
448746	2011 ON_{10}	—	November 4, 2004	Kitt Peak	Spacewatch	·	1.0 km	MPC · JPL
448747	2011 OV_{19}	—	October 4, 2004	Kitt Peak	Spacewatch	NYS	1.3 km	MPC · JPL
448748	2011 OC_{24}	—	April 18, 2007	Kitt Peak	Spacewatch	·	1.0 km	MPC · JPL
448749	2011 OV_{30}	—	March 16, 2007	Kitt Peak	Spacewatch	·	790 m	MPC · JPL
448750	2011 OO_{31}	—	April 14, 2007	Mount Lemmon	Mount Lemmon Survey	·	890 m	MPC · JPL
448751	2011 PB_{10}	—	April 23, 2007	Mount Lemmon	Mount Lemmon Survey	·	1.1 km	MPC · JPL
448752	2011 PV_{10}	—	November 19, 2008	Kitt Peak	Spacewatch	V	540 m	MPC · JPL
448753	2011 QE_{7}	—	December 22, 2008	Mount Lemmon	Mount Lemmon Survey	·	1.2 km	MPC · JPL
448754	2011 QR_{10}	—	March 5, 2006	Kitt Peak	Spacewatch	·	1.2 km	MPC · JPL
448755	2011 QE_{11}	—	January 27, 2006	Mount Lemmon	Mount Lemmon Survey	·	1 km	MPC · JPL
448756	2011 QA_{12}	—	June 14, 2007	Kitt Peak	Spacewatch	·	1.2 km	MPC · JPL
448757	2011 QV_{12}	—	June 5, 2011	Mount Lemmon	Mount Lemmon Survey	·	1.0 km	MPC · JPL
448758	2011 QG_{15}	—	September 9, 2007	Kitt Peak	Spacewatch	EUN	1.2 km	MPC · JPL
448759	2011 QN_{24}	—	January 3, 2009	Kitt Peak	Spacewatch	MAS	680 m	MPC · JPL
448760	2011 QD_{66}	—	April 25, 2007	Kitt Peak	Spacewatch	·	960 m	MPC · JPL
448761	2011 QO_{74}	—	June 21, 2007	Mount Lemmon	Mount Lemmon Survey	·	1.5 km	MPC · JPL
448762	2011 QJ_{85}	—	September 15, 2007	Kitt Peak	Spacewatch	·	990 m	MPC · JPL
448763	2011 QL_{91}	—	October 1, 2000	Socorro	LINEAR	·	1.1 km	MPC · JPL
448764	2011 QP_{97}	—	May 13, 2010	WISE	WISE	·	3.8 km	MPC · JPL
448765	2011 RQ_{3}	—	November 20, 2008	Kitt Peak	Spacewatch	V	600 m	MPC · JPL
448766	2011 RG_{8}	—	December 12, 2004	Kitt Peak	Spacewatch	·	1.2 km	MPC · JPL
448767	2011 RV_{13}	—	September 10, 2007	Mount Lemmon	Mount Lemmon Survey	KON	1.4 km	MPC · JPL
448768	2011 SR_{33}	—	August 16, 2007	XuYi	PMO NEO Survey Program	·	1.4 km	MPC · JPL
448769	2011 SH_{53}	—	September 8, 2011	Kitt Peak	Spacewatch	MAR	1.0 km	MPC · JPL
448770	2011 SZ_{68}	—	March 16, 2010	Kitt Peak	Spacewatch	·	3.1 km	MPC · JPL
448771	2011 SR_{77}	—	September 13, 2007	Kitt Peak	Spacewatch	·	880 m	MPC · JPL
448772	2011 SL_{78}	—	February 26, 2009	Catalina	CSS	·	1.2 km	MPC · JPL
448773	2011 SH_{84}	—	October 9, 2007	Kitt Peak	Spacewatch	·	990 m	MPC · JPL
448774	2011 SW_{85}	—	October 14, 2007	Mount Lemmon	Mount Lemmon Survey	·	1.1 km	MPC · JPL
448775	2011 SE_{91}	—	September 22, 2011	Kitt Peak	Spacewatch	·	1.1 km	MPC · JPL
448776	2011 SW_{92}	—	May 9, 2010	Mount Lemmon	Mount Lemmon Survey	V	690 m	MPC · JPL
448777	2011 SW_{112}	—	December 21, 2000	Kitt Peak	Spacewatch	NYS	1.3 km	MPC · JPL
448778	2011 SK_{114}	—	September 20, 2011	Catalina	CSS	MRX	1.2 km	MPC · JPL
448779	2011 SP_{114}	—	December 13, 2007	Socorro	LINEAR	·	1.1 km	MPC · JPL
448780	2011 SG_{118}	—	February 25, 2010	WISE	WISE	EUN	2.2 km	MPC · JPL
448781	2011 SP_{130}	—	July 25, 2010	WISE	WISE	·	2.1 km	MPC · JPL
448782	2011 ST_{131}	—	September 23, 2011	Kitt Peak	Spacewatch	·	2.3 km	MPC · JPL
448783	2011 SQ_{141}	—	February 26, 2009	Mount Lemmon	Mount Lemmon Survey	·	1.5 km	MPC · JPL
448784	2011 SW_{143}	—	April 11, 2010	Mount Lemmon	Mount Lemmon Survey	·	840 m	MPC · JPL
448785	2011 SN_{149}	—	September 3, 2007	Catalina	CSS	·	1.1 km	MPC · JPL
448786	2011 SG_{162}	—	September 23, 2011	Kitt Peak	Spacewatch	·	2.3 km	MPC · JPL
448787	2011 SK_{162}	—	October 20, 2007	Mount Lemmon	Mount Lemmon Survey	·	1.2 km	MPC · JPL
448788	2011 SJ_{165}	—	November 8, 2007	Mount Lemmon	Mount Lemmon Survey	·	840 m	MPC · JPL
448789	2011 SV_{168}	—	September 21, 2011	Kitt Peak	Spacewatch	·	1.7 km	MPC · JPL
448790	2011 SX_{168}	—	September 28, 2011	Mount Lemmon	Mount Lemmon Survey	·	1.7 km	MPC · JPL
448791	2011 SW_{182}	—	September 26, 2011	Kitt Peak	Spacewatch	·	1.6 km	MPC · JPL
448792	2011 SW_{187}	—	September 22, 2011	Kitt Peak	Spacewatch	·	1.2 km	MPC · JPL
448793	2011 SL_{212}	—	March 24, 2006	Mount Lemmon	Mount Lemmon Survey	PHO	1.0 km	MPC · JPL
448794	2011 SM_{215}	—	October 28, 1994	Kitt Peak	Spacewatch	·	1.3 km	MPC · JPL
448795	2011 SM_{227}	—	October 21, 2007	Mount Lemmon	Mount Lemmon Survey	·	1.3 km	MPC · JPL
448796	2011 SM_{235}	—	December 16, 2007	Mount Lemmon	Mount Lemmon Survey	·	1.1 km	MPC · JPL
448797	2011 SV_{238}	—	September 9, 2011	Kitt Peak	Spacewatch	MAS	800 m	MPC · JPL
448798	2011 SF_{249}	—	September 27, 2011	Mount Lemmon	Mount Lemmon Survey	·	2.4 km	MPC · JPL
448799	2011 SX_{259}	—	October 16, 2007	Kitt Peak	Spacewatch	·	1.0 km	MPC · JPL
448800	2011 SA_{261}	—	December 17, 2007	Catalina	CSS	·	1.4 km	MPC · JPL

== 448801–448900 ==
back to top

Designation			Discovery			Properties		Ref
Permanent	Provisional	Named after	Date	Site	Discoverer(s)	Category	Diam.	Ref
448801	2011 SW_{272}	—	May 25, 2006	Kitt Peak	Spacewatch	KON	2.7 km	MPC · JPL
448802	2011 SK_{273}	—	April 23, 1996	Kitt Peak	Spacewatch	·	1.3 km	MPC · JPL
448803	2011 SU_{273}	—	November 8, 2007	Kitt Peak	Spacewatch	·	1.6 km	MPC · JPL
448804	2011 TF_{2}	—	June 19, 2006	Kitt Peak	Spacewatch	·	1.4 km	MPC · JPL
448805	2011 TG_{6}	—	August 28, 2011	Siding Spring	SSS	·	1.7 km	MPC · JPL
448806	2011 TH_{16}	—	April 24, 2006	Kitt Peak	Spacewatch	·	1.5 km	MPC · JPL
448807	2011 TB_{17}	—	August 12, 2007	XuYi	PMO NEO Survey Program	MAS	700 m	MPC · JPL
448808	2011 UD_{7}	—	October 18, 2011	Mount Lemmon	Mount Lemmon Survey	·	1.3 km	MPC · JPL
448809	2011 UK_{7}	—	April 16, 2005	Kitt Peak	Spacewatch	·	2.4 km	MPC · JPL
448810	2011 UO_{7}	—	September 14, 2007	Mount Lemmon	Mount Lemmon Survey	·	820 m	MPC · JPL
448811	2011 UT_{9}	—	October 18, 2011	Mount Lemmon	Mount Lemmon Survey	·	1.3 km	MPC · JPL
448812	2011 UZ_{9}	—	November 4, 2007	Kitt Peak	Spacewatch	(5)	1.1 km	MPC · JPL
448813	2011 UJ_{12}	—	September 12, 2007	Mount Lemmon	Mount Lemmon Survey	MAS	980 m	MPC · JPL
448814	2011 UO_{16}	—	October 21, 2007	Mount Lemmon	Mount Lemmon Survey	·	980 m	MPC · JPL
448815	2011 UQ_{16}	—	October 18, 2011	Mount Lemmon	Mount Lemmon Survey	·	1.1 km	MPC · JPL
448816	2011 UT_{16}	—	November 17, 2006	Mount Lemmon	Mount Lemmon Survey	EOS	2.0 km	MPC · JPL
448817	2011 UD_{18}	—	November 14, 2007	Kitt Peak	Spacewatch	·	650 m	MPC · JPL
448818	2011 UU_{20}	—	October 19, 2011	Haleakala	Pan-STARRS 1	AMO +1km	980 m	MPC · JPL
448819	2011 UK_{24}	—	October 17, 2011	Kitt Peak	Spacewatch	EUN	1.1 km	MPC · JPL
448820	2011 UZ_{26}	—	November 19, 2003	Kitt Peak	Spacewatch	·	670 m	MPC · JPL
448821	2011 UT_{28}	—	October 17, 2011	Kitt Peak	Spacewatch	·	1.3 km	MPC · JPL
448822	2011 UJ_{29}	—	December 17, 2007	Mount Lemmon	Mount Lemmon Survey	NEM	2.2 km	MPC · JPL
448823	2011 UV_{30}	—	November 14, 2007	Kitt Peak	Spacewatch	(5)	1.2 km	MPC · JPL
448824	2011 UT_{43}	—	September 23, 2011	Kitt Peak	Spacewatch	·	2.1 km	MPC · JPL
448825	2011 US_{50}	—	September 15, 2007	Mount Lemmon	Mount Lemmon Survey	·	1.2 km	MPC · JPL
448826	2011 UR_{54}	—	November 19, 2007	Mount Lemmon	Mount Lemmon Survey	·	1.4 km	MPC · JPL
448827	2011 UE_{56}	—	December 16, 2007	Mount Lemmon	Mount Lemmon Survey	·	1.8 km	MPC · JPL
448828	2011 UL_{56}	—	November 13, 2007	Kitt Peak	Spacewatch	·	1.8 km	MPC · JPL
448829	2011 UT_{59}	—	November 19, 2003	Kitt Peak	Spacewatch	·	700 m	MPC · JPL
448830	2011 UA_{66}	—	October 20, 2011	Mount Lemmon	Mount Lemmon Survey	·	1.1 km	MPC · JPL
448831	2011 UF_{72}	—	November 3, 2007	Kitt Peak	Spacewatch	·	1.2 km	MPC · JPL
448832	2011 UH_{73}	—	October 18, 2011	Mount Lemmon	Mount Lemmon Survey	(5)	1.2 km	MPC · JPL
448833	2011 UK_{73}	—	October 18, 2011	Mount Lemmon	Mount Lemmon Survey	·	1.0 km	MPC · JPL
448834	2011 UP_{73}	—	September 15, 2007	Mount Lemmon	Mount Lemmon Survey	(5)	1.2 km	MPC · JPL
448835	2011 US_{73}	—	May 14, 2010	WISE	WISE	·	2.9 km	MPC · JPL
448836	2011 UU_{76}	—	October 19, 2011	Kitt Peak	Spacewatch	·	1.5 km	MPC · JPL
448837	2011 UA_{81}	—	October 19, 2011	Kitt Peak	Spacewatch	·	1.4 km	MPC · JPL
448838	2011 UU_{81}	—	December 27, 2003	Kitt Peak	Spacewatch	·	1.1 km	MPC · JPL
448839	2011 UN_{83}	—	October 19, 2006	Kitt Peak	Deep Ecliptic Survey	(5)	1.1 km	MPC · JPL
448840	2011 UE_{86}	—	March 19, 2009	Kitt Peak	Spacewatch	·	1.2 km	MPC · JPL
448841	2011 UH_{90}	—	April 21, 2009	Mount Lemmon	Mount Lemmon Survey	·	1.4 km	MPC · JPL
448842	2011 UH_{95}	—	January 8, 2000	Kitt Peak	Spacewatch	·	970 m	MPC · JPL
448843	2011 UT_{98}	—	January 5, 2003	Socorro	LINEAR	DOR	2.3 km	MPC · JPL
448844	2011 US_{100}	—	September 21, 2011	Kitt Peak	Spacewatch	·	1.1 km	MPC · JPL
448845	2011 UV_{101}	—	November 2, 2007	Mount Lemmon	Mount Lemmon Survey	MAR	1.1 km	MPC · JPL
448846	2011 UX_{103}	—	April 20, 2009	Mount Lemmon	Mount Lemmon Survey	·	1.7 km	MPC · JPL
448847	2011 UM_{107}	—	September 30, 2011	Kitt Peak	Spacewatch	·	1.2 km	MPC · JPL
448848	2011 UF_{118}	—	January 31, 2009	Mount Lemmon	Mount Lemmon Survey	·	1.6 km	MPC · JPL
448849	2011 UC_{122}	—	November 2, 2007	Kitt Peak	Spacewatch	(5)	870 m	MPC · JPL
448850	2011 UB_{126}	—	March 27, 2009	Mount Lemmon	Mount Lemmon Survey	·	1.3 km	MPC · JPL
448851	2011 US_{126}	—	December 29, 2008	Mount Lemmon	Mount Lemmon Survey	·	2.2 km	MPC · JPL
448852	2011 UM_{127}	—	October 20, 2011	Kitt Peak	Spacewatch	DOR	2.5 km	MPC · JPL
448853	2011 UO_{128}	—	November 19, 2007	Kitt Peak	Spacewatch	·	1.3 km	MPC · JPL
448854	2011 UB_{133}	—	September 22, 2011	Mount Lemmon	Mount Lemmon Survey	·	1.7 km	MPC · JPL
448855	2011 UJ_{136}	—	October 20, 2011	Mount Lemmon	Mount Lemmon Survey	·	1.4 km	MPC · JPL
448856	2011 UG_{137}	—	March 27, 2009	Mount Lemmon	Mount Lemmon Survey	NEM	2.3 km	MPC · JPL
448857	2011 UO_{139}	—	September 24, 2011	Mount Lemmon	Mount Lemmon Survey	·	2.0 km	MPC · JPL
448858	2011 UK_{144}	—	October 1, 2011	Mount Lemmon	Mount Lemmon Survey	·	1.9 km	MPC · JPL
448859	2011 UL_{146}	—	January 8, 2000	Kitt Peak	Spacewatch	·	1.1 km	MPC · JPL
448860	2011 UF_{147}	—	November 16, 2007	Mount Lemmon	Mount Lemmon Survey	·	2.2 km	MPC · JPL
448861	2011 UJ_{150}	—	October 30, 2007	Mount Lemmon	Mount Lemmon Survey	·	1.1 km	MPC · JPL
448862	2011 UT_{152}	—	September 20, 1998	Kitt Peak	Spacewatch	·	920 m	MPC · JPL
448863	2011 UH_{156}	—	October 24, 2011	Mount Lemmon	Mount Lemmon Survey	JUN	950 m	MPC · JPL
448864	2011 UQ_{161}	—	October 23, 2011	Kitt Peak	Spacewatch	·	1.5 km	MPC · JPL
448865	2011 UY_{161}	—	December 10, 2007	Socorro	LINEAR	·	980 m	MPC · JPL
448866	2011 UT_{166}	—	December 3, 2007	Kitt Peak	Spacewatch	·	1.2 km	MPC · JPL
448867	2011 UQ_{179}	—	October 24, 2011	Kitt Peak	Spacewatch	·	1.1 km	MPC · JPL
448868	2011 UZ_{179}	—	March 3, 2000	Kitt Peak	Spacewatch	(7744)	1.4 km	MPC · JPL
448869	2011 UT_{182}	—	November 12, 2007	Mount Lemmon	Mount Lemmon Survey	·	1.5 km	MPC · JPL
448870	2011 UB_{183}	—	September 14, 2006	Catalina	CSS	·	2.1 km	MPC · JPL
448871	2011 UM_{185}	—	November 16, 2007	Mount Lemmon	Mount Lemmon Survey	·	1.2 km	MPC · JPL
448872	2011 UQ_{199}	—	December 16, 2007	Kitt Peak	Spacewatch	(5)	990 m	MPC · JPL
448873	2011 UG_{204}	—	November 18, 2007	Mount Lemmon	Mount Lemmon Survey	·	830 m	MPC · JPL
448874	2011 UT_{204}	—	December 16, 2007	Kitt Peak	Spacewatch	·	880 m	MPC · JPL
448875	2011 UE_{206}	—	October 21, 2007	Mount Lemmon	Mount Lemmon Survey	(5)	930 m	MPC · JPL
448876	2011 UR_{221}	—	September 29, 2011	Kitt Peak	Spacewatch	·	1.8 km	MPC · JPL
448877	2011 UY_{238}	—	October 17, 2007	Mount Lemmon	Mount Lemmon Survey	MAR	660 m	MPC · JPL
448878	2011 UH_{239}	—	December 4, 2007	Mount Lemmon	Mount Lemmon Survey	·	1.3 km	MPC · JPL
448879	2011 UZ_{239}	—	October 17, 2006	Kitt Peak	Spacewatch	·	1.8 km	MPC · JPL
448880	2011 UN_{240}	—	May 9, 2005	Mount Lemmon	Mount Lemmon Survey	·	1.7 km	MPC · JPL
448881	2011 UE_{242}	—	September 17, 1998	Kitt Peak	Spacewatch	·	1.2 km	MPC · JPL
448882	2011 UH_{250}	—	September 12, 1994	Kitt Peak	Spacewatch	(5)	960 m	MPC · JPL
448883	2011 UL_{250}	—	October 22, 2011	Kitt Peak	Spacewatch	RAF	890 m	MPC · JPL
448884	2011 UW_{252}	—	September 19, 2006	Kitt Peak	Spacewatch	·	3.1 km	MPC · JPL
448885	2011 UF_{266}	—	November 26, 2003	Kitt Peak	Spacewatch	·	1.2 km	MPC · JPL
448886	2011 UB_{267}	—	October 1, 2011	Kitt Peak	Spacewatch	·	1.5 km	MPC · JPL
448887	2011 UW_{267}	—	December 3, 2007	Kitt Peak	Spacewatch	·	1.7 km	MPC · JPL
448888	2011 UH_{269}	—	January 16, 2004	Kitt Peak	Spacewatch	(5)	1.0 km	MPC · JPL
448889	2011 UQ_{269}	—	November 18, 2007	Mount Lemmon	Mount Lemmon Survey	(5)	930 m	MPC · JPL
448890	2011 UV_{277}	—	October 21, 2011	Mount Lemmon	Mount Lemmon Survey	NEM	2.4 km	MPC · JPL
448891	2011 UV_{286}	—	October 18, 2007	Kitt Peak	Spacewatch	·	1.1 km	MPC · JPL
448892	2011 UE_{287}	—	October 1, 2011	Kitt Peak	Spacewatch	·	1.9 km	MPC · JPL
448893	2011 UJ_{293}	—	November 19, 2007	Kitt Peak	Spacewatch	(5)	1.1 km	MPC · JPL
448894	2011 UY_{293}	—	September 18, 2006	Kitt Peak	Spacewatch	·	1.5 km	MPC · JPL
448895	2011 UZ_{293}	—	October 24, 2011	Mount Lemmon	Mount Lemmon Survey	·	1.7 km	MPC · JPL
448896	2011 US_{295}	—	September 28, 2011	Kitt Peak	Spacewatch	·	2.5 km	MPC · JPL
448897	2011 UV_{295}	—	April 11, 2005	Kitt Peak	Spacewatch	·	1.6 km	MPC · JPL
448898	2011 UN_{298}	—	December 20, 2007	Mount Lemmon	Mount Lemmon Survey	·	920 m	MPC · JPL
448899	2011 UV_{298}	—	December 7, 1999	Kitt Peak	Spacewatch	·	1.1 km	MPC · JPL
448900	2011 UM_{299}	—	October 29, 2011	Kitt Peak	Spacewatch	·	1.4 km	MPC · JPL

== 448901–449000 ==
back to top

Designation			Discovery			Properties		Ref
Permanent	Provisional	Named after	Date	Site	Discoverer(s)	Category	Diam.	Ref
448901	2011 UJ_{300}	—	November 11, 2007	Mount Lemmon	Mount Lemmon Survey	·	2.1 km	MPC · JPL
448902	2011 UT_{300}	—	February 27, 2009	Kitt Peak	Spacewatch	BRG	1.3 km	MPC · JPL
448903	2011 UH_{315}	—	October 18, 2011	Kitt Peak	Spacewatch	EUN	1.3 km	MPC · JPL
448904	2011 UO_{317}	—	April 11, 2005	Mount Lemmon	Mount Lemmon Survey	·	1.7 km	MPC · JPL
448905	2011 UH_{318}	—	November 17, 2007	Kitt Peak	Spacewatch	·	790 m	MPC · JPL
448906	2011 UT_{318}	—	April 20, 2009	Kitt Peak	Spacewatch	·	1.3 km	MPC · JPL
448907	2011 UB_{322}	—	September 15, 2006	Kitt Peak	Spacewatch	·	1.6 km	MPC · JPL
448908	2011 UQ_{326}	—	November 1, 1999	Kitt Peak	Spacewatch	·	970 m	MPC · JPL
448909	2011 UN_{331}	—	January 1, 2008	Kitt Peak	Spacewatch	·	820 m	MPC · JPL
448910	2011 UP_{334}	—	January 16, 2004	Kitt Peak	Spacewatch	·	740 m	MPC · JPL
448911	2011 UN_{339}	—	October 13, 2007	Mount Lemmon	Mount Lemmon Survey	MAR	810 m	MPC · JPL
448912	2011 UY_{342}	—	October 18, 2011	Kitt Peak	Spacewatch	·	1.5 km	MPC · JPL
448913	2011 UK_{364}	—	April 7, 2010	WISE	WISE	·	2.4 km	MPC · JPL
448914	2011 UP_{365}	—	October 22, 2011	Mount Lemmon	Mount Lemmon Survey	·	980 m	MPC · JPL
448915	2011 UM_{368}	—	April 30, 2009	Mount Lemmon	Mount Lemmon Survey	·	1.7 km	MPC · JPL
448916	2011 UV_{378}	—	September 14, 2007	Mount Lemmon	Mount Lemmon Survey	V	560 m	MPC · JPL
448917	2011 UD_{379}	—	November 11, 2007	Mount Lemmon	Mount Lemmon Survey	·	1.3 km	MPC · JPL
448918	2011 UU_{379}	—	October 23, 2011	Kitt Peak	Spacewatch	·	1.4 km	MPC · JPL
448919	2011 UO_{382}	—	October 24, 2011	Kitt Peak	Spacewatch	(5)	1.2 km	MPC · JPL
448920	2011 UT_{386}	—	February 9, 2005	Mount Lemmon	Mount Lemmon Survey	·	1.6 km	MPC · JPL
448921	2011 UZ_{387}	—	March 18, 2009	Kitt Peak	Spacewatch	·	1.2 km	MPC · JPL
448922	2011 UR_{394}	—	October 15, 1995	Kitt Peak	Spacewatch	·	770 m	MPC · JPL
448923	2011 UH_{397}	—	November 19, 2003	Kitt Peak	Spacewatch	·	1.0 km	MPC · JPL
448924	2011 UJ_{397}	—	September 23, 2011	Kitt Peak	Spacewatch	·	1.7 km	MPC · JPL
448925	2011 UL_{407}	—	September 26, 2011	Catalina	CSS	·	1.2 km	MPC · JPL
448926	2011 VG_{3}	—	November 1, 2011	Catalina	CSS	·	1.7 km	MPC · JPL
448927	2011 VG_{4}	—	October 6, 1994	Kitt Peak	Spacewatch	·	1.3 km	MPC · JPL
448928	2011 VQ_{6}	—	November 9, 2007	Kitt Peak	Spacewatch	·	2.0 km	MPC · JPL
448929	2011 VC_{8}	—	December 28, 1998	Kitt Peak	Spacewatch	·	1.7 km	MPC · JPL
448930	2011 VH_{11}	—	October 20, 2011	Mount Lemmon	Mount Lemmon Survey	·	1.8 km	MPC · JPL
448931	2011 VN_{16}	—	November 17, 2007	Kitt Peak	Spacewatch	·	1.5 km	MPC · JPL
448932	2011 VS_{17}	—	October 27, 2011	Catalina	CSS	ADE	2.6 km	MPC · JPL
448933	2011 VL_{18}	—	September 13, 2007	Kitt Peak	Spacewatch	·	1.0 km	MPC · JPL
448934	2011 WN_{1}	—	January 17, 2008	Mount Lemmon	Mount Lemmon Survey	·	2.0 km	MPC · JPL
448935	2011 WC_{2}	—	November 5, 2007	Kitt Peak	Spacewatch	·	1.4 km	MPC · JPL
448936	2011 WD_{4}	—	November 15, 2011	Kitt Peak	Spacewatch	·	2.1 km	MPC · JPL
448937	2011 WC_{9}	—	September 24, 2011	Mount Lemmon	Mount Lemmon Survey	·	1.3 km	MPC · JPL
448938	2011 WT_{9}	—	September 24, 2011	Mount Lemmon	Mount Lemmon Survey	·	1.3 km	MPC · JPL
448939	2011 WY_{15}	—	October 20, 2011	Mount Lemmon	Mount Lemmon Survey	·	2.2 km	MPC · JPL
448940	2011 WE_{16}	—	December 19, 2003	Socorro	LINEAR	·	1.3 km	MPC · JPL
448941	2011 WM_{17}	—	December 14, 1998	Kitt Peak	Spacewatch	·	1.4 km	MPC · JPL
448942	2011 WL_{31}	—	January 15, 2004	Kitt Peak	Spacewatch	EUN	1.5 km	MPC · JPL
448943	2011 WL_{32}	—	October 20, 2011	Mount Lemmon	Mount Lemmon Survey	·	2.4 km	MPC · JPL
448944	2011 WJ_{34}	—	March 28, 2009	Kitt Peak	Spacewatch	PAD	1.5 km	MPC · JPL
448945	2011 WJ_{43}	—	November 16, 2011	Mount Lemmon	Mount Lemmon Survey	·	1.4 km	MPC · JPL
448946	2011 WR_{43}	—	November 13, 2007	Kitt Peak	Spacewatch	(5)	1.4 km	MPC · JPL
448947	2011 WL_{52}	—	September 25, 2006	Mount Lemmon	Mount Lemmon Survey	·	1.5 km	MPC · JPL
448948	2011 WN_{56}	—	May 1, 2009	Mount Lemmon	Mount Lemmon Survey	·	1.1 km	MPC · JPL
448949	2011 WG_{62}	—	November 16, 2006	Mount Lemmon	Mount Lemmon Survey	TRE	3.5 km	MPC · JPL
448950	2011 WC_{66}	—	July 18, 2006	Siding Spring	SSS	MAR	1.3 km	MPC · JPL
448951	2011 WT_{66}	—	December 17, 2003	Kitt Peak	Spacewatch	·	1.2 km	MPC · JPL
448952	2011 WZ_{71}	—	January 10, 2008	Mount Lemmon	Mount Lemmon Survey	·	1.1 km	MPC · JPL
448953	2011 WE_{72}	—	April 5, 2005	Mount Lemmon	Mount Lemmon Survey	·	1.1 km	MPC · JPL
448954	2011 WF_{73}	—	December 5, 2002	Kitt Peak	Spacewatch	·	2.3 km	MPC · JPL
448955	2011 WU_{82}	—	October 22, 2011	Kitt Peak	Spacewatch	·	1.6 km	MPC · JPL
448956	2011 WB_{84}	—	December 19, 2007	Mount Lemmon	Mount Lemmon Survey	GEF	980 m	MPC · JPL
448957	2011 WL_{88}	—	September 17, 2006	Kitt Peak	Spacewatch	·	1.4 km	MPC · JPL
448958	2011 WF_{91}	—	May 9, 2004	Kitt Peak	Spacewatch	·	2.0 km	MPC · JPL
448959	2011 WN_{97}	—	October 24, 2011	Kitt Peak	Spacewatch	·	1.6 km	MPC · JPL
448960	2011 WM_{102}	—	November 3, 2011	Kitt Peak	Spacewatch	·	1.8 km	MPC · JPL
448961	2011 WD_{116}	—	November 16, 2011	Mount Lemmon	Mount Lemmon Survey	·	1.2 km	MPC · JPL
448962	2011 WN_{120}	—	December 4, 2007	Catalina	CSS	·	1.8 km	MPC · JPL
448963	2011 WN_{123}	—	September 19, 2006	Kitt Peak	Spacewatch	·	1.5 km	MPC · JPL
448964	2011 WT_{123}	—	May 8, 2005	Mount Lemmon	Mount Lemmon Survey	·	1.6 km	MPC · JPL
448965	2011 WK_{129}	—	December 31, 2007	Kitt Peak	Spacewatch	·	1.7 km	MPC · JPL
448966	2011 WY_{129}	—	March 31, 2009	Kitt Peak	Spacewatch	MAR	1.0 km	MPC · JPL
448967	2011 WY_{133}	—	September 11, 1998	Caussols	ODAS	·	1.1 km	MPC · JPL
448968	2011 WE_{134}	—	August 28, 2006	Kitt Peak	Spacewatch	·	1.3 km	MPC · JPL
448969	2011 WS_{153}	—	March 12, 2000	Kitt Peak	Spacewatch	·	2.0 km	MPC · JPL
448970	2011 XL	—	January 13, 2008	Kitt Peak	Spacewatch	·	1.4 km	MPC · JPL
448971	2011 YA_{13}	—	November 4, 2007	Mount Lemmon	Mount Lemmon Survey	·	1.3 km	MPC · JPL
448972	2011 YV_{15}	—	December 10, 2001	Socorro	LINEAR	AMO +1km	1.3 km	MPC · JPL
448973	2011 YR_{20}	—	September 20, 2009	Kitt Peak	Spacewatch	·	3.7 km	MPC · JPL
448974	2011 YR_{21}	—	November 18, 2007	Kitt Peak	Spacewatch	·	3.3 km	MPC · JPL
448975	2011 YT_{23}	—	December 21, 2005	Kitt Peak	Spacewatch	·	2.9 km	MPC · JPL
448976	2011 YX_{26}	—	December 19, 2007	Mount Lemmon	Mount Lemmon Survey	·	1.5 km	MPC · JPL
448977	2011 YL_{29}	—	January 17, 2007	Kitt Peak	Spacewatch	EOS	1.6 km	MPC · JPL
448978	2011 YM_{50}	—	February 17, 2007	Catalina	CSS	·	2.7 km	MPC · JPL
448979	2011 YU_{50}	—	November 21, 2007	Mount Lemmon	Mount Lemmon Survey	·	1.3 km	MPC · JPL
448980	2011 YX_{53}	—	October 6, 2002	Socorro	LINEAR	(1547)	2.0 km	MPC · JPL
448981	2011 YO_{68}	—	October 28, 2006	Catalina	CSS	EUN	1.3 km	MPC · JPL
448982	2011 YB_{73}	—	October 29, 2006	Catalina	CSS	GEF	1.1 km	MPC · JPL
448983	2011 YN_{75}	—	November 4, 2007	Mount Lemmon	Mount Lemmon Survey	·	1.6 km	MPC · JPL
448984	2011 YH_{78}	—	October 2, 2010	Mount Lemmon	Mount Lemmon Survey	·	4.5 km	MPC · JPL
448985	2012 AN_{6}	—	February 3, 2008	Kitt Peak	Spacewatch	·	1.3 km	MPC · JPL
448986	2012 AO_{9}	—	September 13, 2005	Kitt Peak	Spacewatch	·	1.8 km	MPC · JPL
448987	2012 AP_{12}	—	December 25, 2011	Kitt Peak	Spacewatch	·	1.5 km	MPC · JPL
448988 Changzhong	2012 AS_{14}	Changzhong	March 23, 2009	XuYi	PMO NEO Survey Program	·	2.3 km	MPC · JPL
448989	2012 BK_{21}	—	July 20, 2010	WISE	WISE	·	4.7 km	MPC · JPL
448990	2012 BD_{23}	—	April 15, 2007	Catalina	CSS	·	3.4 km	MPC · JPL
448991	2012 BO_{23}	—	August 27, 2006	Kitt Peak	Spacewatch	·	1.4 km	MPC · JPL
448992	2012 BL_{26}	—	March 9, 2002	Kitt Peak	Spacewatch	·	2.2 km	MPC · JPL
448993	2012 BP_{28}	—	March 10, 2008	Mount Lemmon	Mount Lemmon Survey	·	2.1 km	MPC · JPL
448994	2012 BT_{28}	—	November 11, 2001	Anderson Mesa	LONEOS	·	2.7 km	MPC · JPL
448995	2012 BB_{29}	—	December 27, 2011	Kitt Peak	Spacewatch	AST	1.7 km	MPC · JPL
448996	2012 BN_{30}	—	October 18, 2006	Kitt Peak	Spacewatch	AEO	1.2 km	MPC · JPL
448997	2012 BE_{36}	—	July 12, 2005	Mount Lemmon	Mount Lemmon Survey	·	2.5 km	MPC · JPL
448998	2012 BH_{47}	—	October 12, 2010	Mount Lemmon	Mount Lemmon Survey	·	1.8 km	MPC · JPL
448999	2012 BV_{49}	—	July 4, 2005	Mount Lemmon	Mount Lemmon Survey	·	1.8 km	MPC · JPL
449000	2012 BY_{53}	—	July 29, 2010	WISE	WISE	·	3.4 km	MPC · JPL

back to top

== Meaning of names ==
As minor planet discoveries are confirmed, they are given a permanent number by the IAU's Minor Planet Center (MPC), and the discoverers can then submit names for them, following the IAU's naming conventions. The list below concerns those minor planets in the specified number-range that have received names, and explains the meanings of those names.

Official naming citations of newly named small Solar System bodies are approved and published in a bulletin by IAU's Working Group for Small Bodies Nomenclature (WGSBN). Before May 2021, citations were published in MPC's Minor Planet Circulars for many decades. Recent citations can also be found on the JPL Small-Body Database (SBDB). Until his death in 2016, German astronomer Lutz D. Schmadel compiled these citations into the Dictionary of Minor Planet Names (DMP) and regularly updated the collection.

Based on Paul Herget's The Names of the Minor Planets, Schmadel also researched the unclear origin of numerous asteroids, most of which had been named prior to World War II. This article incorporates text from this source, which is in the public domain: SBDB New namings may only be added to this list below after official publication as the preannouncement of names is condemned. The WGSBN publishes a comprehensive guideline for the naming rules of non-cometary small Solar System bodies.

Named minor planet	Provisional	This minor planet was named for...	Ref · Catalog
448051 Pepisensi	2008 FW_{61}	Josefa "Pepi" (born 1993) and Ascension "Sensi" (born 1994) are the respective daughters of Spanish astronomers Sensi Pastor and José Antonio Reyes, who discovered this minor planet.	JPL · 448051
448988 Changzhong	2012 AS_{14}	Changzhong (Changzhou Senior High School of Jiangsu Province) is located in the historic city of Changzhou, China. Founded in 1907, the school has educated students who have made contributions to the reform and development of Chinese society, including more than 20 academicians of the Chinese Academy of Sciences and the Chinese Academy of Engineering.	IAU · 448988
