= 2011 in China =

- Decades: 1990s; 2000s; 2010s; 2020s
- See also: Other events of 2011; History of China • Timeline • Years

Events in the year 2011 in China.

== Incumbents ==
- Party General Secretary - Hu Jintao
- President – Hu Jintao
- Premier – Wen Jiabao
- Vice President – Xi Jinping
- Vice Premier – Li Keqiang
- Congress Chairman - Wu Bangguo
- Conference Chairman - Jia Qinglin

=== Governors ===
- Governor of Anhui Province – Wang Sanyun (until December), Li Bin (starting December)
- Governor of Fujian Province – Huang Xiaojing (until April), Su Shulin (starting April)
- Governor of Gansu Province – Liu Weiping
- Governor of Guangdong Province – Zhu Xiaodan (until 5 November), Huang Huahua (starting 5 November)
- Governor of Guizhou Province – Zhao Kezhi (until December), Chen Min'er (starting December)
- Governor of Hainan Province – Luo Baoming (until August), Jiang Dingzhi (starting August)
- Governor of Hebei Province – Chen Quanguo (until 27 August)
- Governor of Heilongjiang Province – Wang Xiankui
- Governor of Henan Province – Guo Gengmao
- Governor of Hubei Province – Wang Guosheng
- Governor of Hunan Province – Xu Shousheng
- Governor of Jiangsu Province – Li Xueyong
- Governor of Jiangxi Province – Wu Xinxiong (until June), Lu Xinshe (starting June)
- Governor of Jilin Province – Wang Rulin (until December), Bayanqolu (starting December)
- Governor of Liaoning Province – Chen Zhenggao
- Governor of Qinghai Province – Luo Huining
- Governor of Shaanxi Province – Zhao Zhengyong
- Governor of Shandong Province – Jiang Daming
- Governor of Shanxi Province – Wang Jun (until December), Li Xiaopeng (starting December)
- Governor of Sichuan Province – Jiang Jufeng
- Governor of Yunnan Province – Qin Guangrong (until August), Li Jiheng (starting August)
- Governor of Zhejiang Province – Lü Zushan (until August), Xia Baolong (starting August)

== Events ==
In 2011, China enacted its Law on the Protection of Intangible Cultural Heritages.

=== January ===
- January 6 – Jiaxing Xiuzhou District case of fish kill.
- January 11 – China successfully tests the Chengdu J-20 Black Eagle, one of its fifth generation stealth, twin-engine fighter aircraft programs.
- January 23 – CCTV Chengdu J-10 footage controversy

=== February ===
- February 1 – The Chinese government begins efforts to combat an ongoing drought.
- February 20 – 2011 Chinese pro-democracy protests
- February 28 – 2011 crackdown on dissidents in the People's Republic of China (est.)

=== March ===
2011 Yunnan earthquake
- March 2 – 2011 Gyeongryeolbi island fishing incident
- March 10 – 2011 Yunnan earthquake: At least 24 people are killed and 207 injured following a 5.4 magnitude earthquake in Yingjiang County of the Yunnan province near the Burma border.
- March 16 – Phuntsog self-immolation incident
- March 29 – 2011 Yunnan protest

=== April ===
- April 5 – The Ministry of Health dismissed media coverages about Yinzibing (HIV-negative AIDS).
- April 13 – 2011 Shanghai riot
- April 14 – 2011 BRICS summit
- April 17 – 2011 Chinese Grand Prix
- April 20 – 2011 Shanghai Truckers Strike
- April 22 – Wang Jia-zheng (汪家正) self-immolation incident
- April 28 – Xi'an China International Horticultural Exposition 2011

=== May ===
- May 10 – 2011 Xilinhot incident
- May 13 – Yang Xianwen (杨显文) Tianzhu bank bombing case
- May 20 – 2011 Chengdu Foxconn explosion incident
- May 26 – 2011 Fuzhou, Jiangxi bombings
- May – My Heart Sings Loud television variety show is launched by Dragon TV.

=== June ===
- June 1 – Painting Dwelling in the Fuchun Mountains reunify the two halves of the painting held by Republic of China and the People's Republic of China
- June 6 – 2011 Chaozhou riot
- June 7 – Wang Meng assault incident
- June 10 –
  - Tianjin bombing
  - 2011 Zengcheng riot
- June 11 – 2011 China floods (est.)
- June 11 – 17 – 3rd Straits Forum
- June 16 – Mutiny on Lurongyu 2682, a fishing trawler in the South Pacific. After a month-long killings from this day, 11 of the 33 crew returned to China.
- June 26 – National Red Games, celebration of 90th anniversary of founding of Communist party

=== July ===
- July 1 – Jiang Zemin disappearance and death rumor
- July 5 – Disclosure of China National Offshore Oil Corporation 2011 Bohai bay oil spill
- July 11 – 2011 Huizhou refinery explosion incident
- July 18 – 2011 Hotan attack
- July 23 – 2011 Wenzhou train collision
- July 24 – Canada extradites Lai Changxing to China
- July 30–31 – 2011 Kashgar attacks

=== August ===
- August 1 – Nepal rejects China-UN backed Lumbini project
- August 4 – 2011 Nanchang mass suicide protest
- August 11 – 2011 Qianxi riot
- August 14 – Dalian PX protest
- August 12 – 2011 Summer Universiade
- August 26 – 2011 Jiangmen dog ban
- August 30 - Yunnan Nanpan River chromium toxic spill (est.)

=== September ===
- September 1 – First China-Eurasia Expo
- September 16 – Line 2, The first line of the Xian Subway was completed.
- September 23 – 2011 Lufeng city riot
- September 26 – Lobsang Kalsang and Lobsang Konchok self-immolation incident
- September 27 – Shandong Foxconn fire incident
- September 29 – Launch of Tiangong 1

=== October ===
- October 5 – 13 Chinese crew members of two ships are murdered in the Mekong River massacre
- October 10 – 100th Anniversary of Xinhai Revolution
- October 13 – Death of Wang Yue and public outcry in the aftermath
- October 19 – Seventh Chen-Chiang summit
- October 21 – 2011 Tiananmen Square self-immolation incident
- October 26 – 2011 Zhili riot
- October 31 – Announcement of Sunway BlueLight, first supercomputer to use domestic processors

=== November ===
- November 1 – Launch of Shenzhou 8
- November 12 – 2011 Zhongshan riot
- November 14 – Xi'an gas explosion
- November 16 – 2011 Gansu school bus crash
- November 20 – North Korean guards cross to Kuandian Manchu Autonomous County after death of Kim Jong-il
- November 27 – Billionaire real estate tycoon Huang Nubo is rejected to purchase parts of Iceland

=== December ===
- December 12 – 2011 Incheon fishing incident
- December 21 - Protests of Wukan end
- December 28 - 2011 Pishan hostage crisis

== Deaths ==
- January 14 – Liu Huaqing, 94, Chinese naval commander (1982–1988).
- February 13 – Shi Yafeng, 91, Chinese geologist.
- February 17 – Augustine Hu Daguo, 88, Chinese Roman Catholic underground bishop of Guiyang.
- February 19 – Yuan Xuefen, 88, Chinese Yue opera actress.
- August 7 – Li Xing (黎星), 54, Chinese-English journalist

=== Full date unknown ===
- Liang Tianzhu, Chinese painter (born 1916)
