= 2013 in China =

- Decades: 1990s; 2000s; 2010s; 2020s
- See also: Other events of 2013; History of China • Timeline • Years

Events in the year 2013 in China.

== Incumbents ==
- General Secretary of the Communist Party – Xi Jinping
- President
  - Hu Jintao (until March 14)
  - Xi Jinping (from March 14)
- Vice President
  - Xi Jinping (until March 14)
  - Li Yuanchao (from March 14)
- Premier
  - Wen Jiabao (until March 15)
  - Li Keqiang (from March 15)
- Congress chairman
  - Wu Bangguo (until March 14)
  - Zhang Dejiang (from March 14)
- Consultative Conference chairman
  - Jia Qinglin (until March 11)
  - Yu Zhengsheng (from March 11)

=== Governors ===
- Governor of Anhui Province – Li Bin (until March), Wang Xuejun (starting March)
- Governor of Fujian Province – Su Shulin
- Governor of Gansu Province – Liu Weiping
- Governor of Guangdong Province – Zhu Xiaodan
- Governor of Guizhou Province – Chen Min'er
- Governor of Hainan Province – Jiang Dingzhi
- Governor of Hebei Province – Zhang Qingwei
- Governor of Heilongjiang Province: – Wang Xiankui (until March), Lu Hao (starting March)
- Governor of Henan Province – Guo Gengmao (until March), Xie Fuzhan (starting March)
- Governor of Hubei Province – Wang Guosheng
- Governor of Hunan Province – Xu Shousheng (until 5 April), Du Jiahao (starting 5 April)
- Governor of Jiangsu Province – Li Xueyong
- Governor of Jiangxi Province – Lu Xinshe
- Governor of Jilin Province – Bayanqolu
- Governor of Liaoning Province – Chen Zhenggao
- Governor of Qinghai Province – Luo Huining (until March), Hao Peng (starting March)
- Governor of Shaanxi Province – Lou Qinjian
- Governor of Shandong Province – Jiang Daming (until March), Guo Shuqing (starting March)
- Governor of Shanxi Province – Li Xiaopeng
- Governor of Sichuan Province – Jiang Jufeng (until January), Wei Hong (starting January)
- Governor of Yunnan Province – Li Jiheng
- Governor of Zhejiang Province – Li Qiang

== Events ==
=== January ===
- January 3 - 2013 Southern Weekly incident

=== April ===
- April 15 - 2013 Daulat Beg Oldi Incident
- April 20 - 2013 Lushan earthquake
- April 24 - April 2013 Bachu unrest

=== May ===
- May 24 - Ding Jinhao engraving scandal

=== June ===
- June 7 - Xiamen bus fire
- June 16–21 - 5th Straits Forum
- June 22 - 2013 Shanghai shooting
- June 26 - June 2013 Shanshan riots

=== July ===
- Early July - 2013 Southwest China floods
- July 19 – The court case for the Mutiny on Lurongyu 2682 was decided. The 11 sailors returned were convicted with murder, leading to the deaths of 22 in the South Pacific.
- July 20 - 2013 Beijing Capital International Airport bombing

=== October ===
- October 21 - 2013 Harbin smog starts to spread.

== Deaths ==
- January 28 - Xu Liangying, physicist, translator, historian and philosopher (b. 1920)
- June 2 - Chen Xitong, politician, former member of the Political Bureau (b. 1930)
- June 4 - Luo Meizhen, supercentenarian (b. 1885)

== See also ==
- List of Chinese films of 2013
