= 2014 in China =

- Decades: 1990s; 2000s; 2010s; 2020s
- See also: Other events of 2014; History of China • Timeline • Years

Events in the year 2014 in China.

== Incumbents ==
- General Secretary of the Chinese Communist Party – Xi Jinping
- President – Xi Jinping
- Vice President – Li Yuanchao
- Premier – Li Keqiang
- Congress chairman – Zhang Dejiang
- Consultative Conference chairman – Yu Zhengsheng

=== Governors ===
- Governor of Anhui Province – Wang Xuejun
- Governor of Fujian Province – Su Shulin
- Governor of Gansu Province – Liu Weiping
- Governor of Guangdong Province – Zhu Xiaodan
- Governor of Guizhou Province – Chen Min'er
- Governor of Hainan Province – Jiang Dingzhi
- Governor of Hebei Province – Zhang Qingwei
- Governor of Heilongjiang Province – Lu Hao
- Governor of Henan Province – Xie Fuzhan
- Governor of Hubei Province – Wang Guosheng
- Governor of Hunan Province – Du Jiahao
- Governor of Jiangsu Province – Li Xueyong
- Governor of Jiangxi Province – Lu Xinshe
- Governor of Jilin Province – Bayanqolu (until September), Jiang Chaoliang (starting September 5)
- Governor of Liaoning Province – Chen Zhenggao (until May), Li Xi (starting May)
- Governor of Qinghai Province – Hao Peng
- Governor of Shaanxi Province – Lou Qinjian
- Governor of Shandong Province – Guo Shuqing
- Governor of Shanxi Province – Li Xiaopeng
- Governor of Sichuan Province – Wei Hong
- Governor of Yunnan Province – Li Jiheng (until October), Chen Hao (starting October)
- Governor of Zhejiang Province – Li Qiang

== Events ==
In 2014, the China Integrated Circuit Industry Investment Fund was established in an effort to reduce dependence on foreign semiconductor companies.

=== January ===
- January 10 – China imposes a "fishing permit" rule in the South China Sea, much to the chagrin of the United States, the Philippines, and Vietnam.
- January 13 – An explosion at an illegal gambling hall in Kaili City, kills fourteen people and injures seven. Police believe it was intentional and are investigating it as a crime.
- January 15 – A graphic video showing the death of a 16-year-old Chinese girl is released after firefighters ran her over in the wake of the Asiana Airlines Flight 214 plane crash.
- January 28 – Sales of live poultry are banned in eastern China after 19 people die from the strain of bird flu this year.

=== February ===
- February 11 – Head of Taiwan Affairs Office met with head of Mainland Affairs Council in Nanjing.
- February 24 – Chinese vessels reportedly harassed Filipino fishermen off the coast of the Philippines last January 27, according to the Philippine military during the South China Sea dispute.

=== March ===
- March 1 – A terrorist attack took place in the Chinese city of Kunming, Yunnan, leaving 29 civilians and 4 perpetrators dead with more than 140 others injured.
- March 8 – A Malaysia Airlines Boeing 777 airliner, carrying 154 Chinese passengers, disappears en route to Beijing.
- March 12 – Malaysia Airlines Flight 370 disappearance
  - China requests activation of the International Charter on Space and Major Disasters meaning international space agencies join an "unprecedented" search for the Malaysian airliner which disappeared over an ocean.
  - A crowdsourcing search effort after the vanished airliner finds a silhouette in the water of similar size and shape to the lost plane. Also, a Chinese satellite sights sizable pieces of debris.
- March 21 – A kindergarten lunch in Qiubei County, is poisoned, leaving 2 children dead and another 30 sick.
- March 24
  - Chinese aircrew report seeing "suspicious objects" in the southern Indian Ocean while searching for the missing Malaysian Airlines plane.
  - A Chinese court jails a man for 18 months after he applied for permission to protest on the anniversary of the 1989 Tiananmen Square protests.
- March 27 – Six people are stabbed to death in a family property dispute in Beijing.

=== April ===
- April 18 – An official study released by the Chinese government reveals that about one-fifth of China's soil is contaminated.
- April 30 – A knife attack and bombing occurred in the Chinese city of Ürümqi, Xinjiang, leaving three people dead and seventy-nine others injured.

=== May ===
- May 6 – Six people are injured in a knife attack at a Chinese train station in Guangzhou.
- May 7 – Vietnamese naval ships and Chinese vessels collide in the South China Sea; the incident occurred while the Vietnamese navy was trying to prevent China from setting up an oil rig in an area to which both nations lay claim.
- May 15 – A group named Turkestan Islamic Party claims the responsibility for the attack on Ürümqi Railway Station.
- May 19
  - Two Chinese workers are kidnapped from a controversial copper mine in Burma by activists.
  - The United States Department of Justice charges five Chinese military officers with hacking into private-sector American companies in a bid for competitive advantage.
- May 21 – Xi Jinping and Vladimir Putin sign a massive 30-year natural gas export contract worth $400 billion.
- May 22 – Two sport utility vehicles carrying five assailants were driven into a busy street market in Ürümqi, the capital of China's Xinjiang Uyghur Autonomous Region. Up to a dozen explosives were thrown at shoppers from the windows of the SUVs. The SUVs crashed into shoppers then collided with each other and exploded. 43 people were killed, including 4 of the assailants, and more than 90 wounded, making this the deadliest attack of the Xinjiang conflict.
- May 23 – Russia and China veto a U.N. Security Council resolution that would have asked the International Criminal Court to investigate war crimes in Syria.
- May 24 – An earthquake in Yunnan Province destroyed 9,412 homes and displaced more than 8,000 people.
- May 26 – At least 26 people are dead and 10 missing since May 21 as storms hit southern and central China.
- May 30 – An earthquake in China's Yunnan injures at least 45 people and forces thousands to relocate.

=== June ===
- June 4 – Authorities in China crack down on dissidents on the 25th anniversary of the Tiananmen Square massacre.
- June 5 – The People's Republic of China claims to have arrested 29 people following recent terrorist attacks in the Xinjiang region.
- June 6
  - At least twelve people are killed as storms batter South China.
  - Chinese authorities advise that they will deport Australian artist Guo Jian arrested before the 25th anniversary of the Tiananmen Square protests.
- June 16 – The People's Republic of China sentences three men to death for a deadly attack at Beijing's Tiananmen Square last October.
- June 23
  - The People's Republic of China arrests 300 people in the first month in a crackdown on alleged terrorists.
  - According to Chinese authorities, assailants drove an explosive-laden car into a police station and detonated it, lightly wounding three police officers. In retaliation, Chinese police shot dead 13 suspects.
- June 25 – The People's Republic of China sends its first minister-level official to Taiwan to build ties with the self-governing island amid trade suspicions.
- June 26 – Authorities in the Xinjiang region sentence 9 people for up to 14 years for terrorism offences.
- June 28 – China's top cross-strait negotiator for Taiwan, on a landmark visit, cancels three public appearances at the last minute after protests against his bridge-building trip turned violent; protesters earlier splashed white paint and threw ghost money at the negotiator's motorcade while shouting slogans such as "Taiwan, China, one country on each side".
- June 30 – The People's Republic of China jails 113 people in Xinjiang autonomous region for terrorism and other offences.

=== July ===
- July 3 – The President of China, Xi Jinping, arrives in South Korea for talks with the President of South Korea, Park Geun-hye, days after a North Korean missile test.
- July 11 – The People's Republic of China jails 32 people for allegedly downloading and spreading violent Islamist material via the Internet to Xinjiang.
- July 17 – Typhoon Rammasun (Glenda) heads for southern China and northern Vietnam after killing at least 38 people in the Philippines with eight missing.
- July 18 – Typhoon Rammasun, which has killed at least 54 people in the Philippines, approaches the southern China provinces of Hainan and Guangdong. Three people are reported killed and eleven injured as a roof collapses on a bank in Shenzhen as a result of heavy rain from the typhoon.
- July 19
  - At least 38 people are killed when a bus collides with a van carrying flammable liquids in the Hunan.
  - Typhoon Rammasun kills at least 14 people in southern China.
- July 20 – The death toll from Typhoon Rammasun reaches 94 in the Philippines and 18 in southern China.
- July 21 – The death toll from Typhoon Rammasun rises to 26 in southern China and 11 in northern Vietnam.
- July 22
  - Typhoon Matmo (Henry) is expected to make landfall over Taiwan en route to eastern China later in the week.
  - Thirty thousand people in the city of Yumen in the Gansu have been prevented from leaving and 151 people placed in quarantine after a man dies of bubonic plague last week.
- July 25 – McDonald's restaurants stop selling Chicken McNuggets and some other chicken products in Hong Kong and Japan from Shanghai Husi Foods that allegedly sold out-of-date items to fast food restaurants.
- July 29
  - Dozens of people are dead after a mob armed with knives rampages through township of Elixku in the restive Xinjiang region and is met with gunfire.
  - Chinese state media report that former Politburo Standing Committee member and security chief Zhou Yongkang is undergoing investigation for "disciplinary violations." (New York Times)
- July 31 – The government-appointed Imam is killed in an attack in Kashgar, Xinjiang province.

=== August ===
- August 2 – Kunshan Zhongrong Metal Production dust explosion in Jiangsu, kills 75 person and injures 185.
- August 3 – 2014 Ludian earthquake, a Richhter scale 6.1 magnitude, with 617 people were fatalities and 3,143 are wounded in Yunnan.
- August 4
  - China dispatches 2,500 People's Liberation Army soldiers to Yunnan province to search for hundreds of people missing after the 2014 Ludian earthquake.
  - The death toll from an explosion at an auto parts factory on Saturday in Kunshan rises to 75 with investigators blaming faulty safety measures.
- August 6
  - The death toll from the 2014 Ludian earthquake in Yunnan province rises to 589 with nine people still missing.
  - Officials in Karamay in Xinjiang, western China, places a temporary ban on Islamic headscarves, clothing and those with beards from using public transport, following violence in the region.
- August 9 – A bus crashes into a ravine in Tibet, killing at least 44 people.
- August 15 – XPeng was founded by Xia Heng in Guangdong Province.
- August 26 – Two high-ranking officials in China's Shanxi, Chen Chuanping and Nie Chunyu, are placed under a corruption investigation by Chinese Communist Party authorities. Chen Chuanping was the CPC party chief of Taiyuan, the provincial capital. The president of China Resources Power, Wang Yujun, is also detained.
- August 28 – Malaysia Airlines Flight 370: Australia, Malaysia and the People's Republic of China reach an agreement about the costs and direction of the ongoing search for the wreckage of Malaysia Airlines Flight 370 which is believed to have crashed in the Indian Ocean southwest of Western Australia.
- August 31 – China's parliament decides Hong Kong cannot freely choose its next leader in 2017.

=== September ===
- September 6 – China says two pilots conducting fighter jet take-off and landing tests for the Chinese aircraft carrier Liaoning have been killed during trials.

=== October ===
- October 15 – Xi Jinping hosts representatives of literary and artistic circles, such as the China Writers Association, at the Forum on the Work of Literature and the Arts in Beijing (wenyi gongzuo zuotanhui 文艺工作座谈会, or commonly, the Beijing Forum on Literature and Art) in Beijing. In his speech at the forum, Xi emphasized the need for literature and art to uphold moral qualities and socialist core values.

=== November ===
- November 12 – Chinese leader Xi Jinping and President of the United States Barack Obama reach a deal to limit greenhouse gases.
- November 16 – A fire at a food processing plant kills at least 18 workers in Shandong.
- November 17 – Australia and the People's Republic of China conclude a free trade deal worth $18 billion.
- November 22 – A 5.9 magnitude earthquake occurs near the town of Kangding in Sichuan resulting at least two deaths and 54 injuries.
- November 23 – The death toll from yesterday's earthquake in Sichuan province rises to four with 54 injured.
- November 26 – A fire in a coal mine in Liaoning kills 24 miners and injures another 52.
- November 29 – Chinese police apprehend and execute eleven Uyghur terrorists following an attack with 15 killed and 14 injured in Yarkant County.

=== December ===
- December 5 – China's Supreme People's Procuratorate arrests former Politburo Standing Committee of the Chinese Communist Party member Zhou Yongkang on corruption charges and expels him from the Chinese Communist Party. (BBC)
- December 31 – 36 people are killed as a result of a stampede at a New Year's Eve celebration in Shanghai.

=== Unknown Date ===
- An electric vehicle brand, XPeng was founded by Xia Heng and He Tao in Guangdong Province.

== Popular culture ==
=== Arts and entertainment ===
For the Chinese films released this year, see List of Chinese films of 2014. For the number-one films at the Chinese box office, see List of 2014 box office number-one films in China.

=== Sports ===
China will host several international sports competitions: the 2014 Summer Youth Olympics, the 2014 World Men's Curling Championship, the 2014 FIBA Asia Cup, the 2014 World Artistic Gymnastics Championships and the 2014 World Open (snooker). Other events include the 2014 Formula Masters China season, the 2014 Shenzhen Open and the 2014 WGC-HSBC Champions.

For the Chinese participation in 2014 Summer Youth Olympics, see China at the 2014 Summer Youth Olympics. For the Chinese participation in the 2014 Winter Olympics, see China at the 2014 Winter Olympics.

Events in Chinese association football include the 2014 Chinese Super League, the 2014 China League One, the 2014 Chinese FA Super Cup and the 2014 Guangdong–Hong Kong Cup. For winter transfers, see List of Chinese football transfers winter 2014.

== Deaths ==
- January 5 – Li Ming, 47, Chinese film production executive, heart attack.

== See also ==
- List of Chinese films of 2014
