= 2016 in China =

- Decades: 1990s; 2000s; 2010s; 2020s
- See also: Other events of 2016; History of China • Timeline • Years

== Incumbents ==
- General Secretary of the Communist Party – Xi Jinping
- President – Xi Jinping
- Vice President – Li Yuanchao
- Premier – Li Keqiang
- Congress chairman – Zhang Dejiang
- Consultative Conference chairman – Yu Zhengsheng

=== Governors ===
- Governor of Anhui Province – Li Jinbin (until September), Li Guoying (starting September)
- Governor of Fujian Province – Yu Weiguo
- Governor of Gansu Province – Liu Weiping (until April), Lin Duo (starting April)
- Governor of Guangdong Province – Zhu Xiaodan (until April), Ma Xingrui (starting April)
- Governor of Guizhou Province – Sun Zhigang (until September), Shen Yiqin (starting September)
- Governor of Hainan Province – Liu Cigui (until 7 April), Shen Xiaoming (starting 7 April)
- Governor of Hebei Province – Zhang Qingwei
- Governor of Heilongjiang Province – Lu Hao
- Governor of Henan Province – Xie Fuzhan (until April), Chen Run'er (starting April)
- Governor of Hubei Province – Wang Guosheng (until June), Wang Xiaodong (starting September)
- Governor of Hunan Province – Du Jiahao (until September), Xu Dazhe (starting September)
- Governor of Jiangsu Province – Shi Taifeng
- Governor of Jiangxi Province – Lu Xinshe (until July), Liu Qi (starting July)
- Governor of Jilin Province – Jiang Chaoliang (until 29 October), Liu Guozhong (starting 29 October)
- Governor of Liaoning Province – Chen Qiufa
- Governor of Qinghai Province – Hao Peng (until December), Wang Jianjun (starting December)
- Governor of Shaanxi Province – Lou Qinjian (until April), Hu Heping (starting April)
- Governor of Shandong Province – Guo Shuqing
- Governor of Shanxi Province – Li Xiaopeng (until August), Lou Yangsheng (starting August)
- Governor of Sichuan Province – Wei Hong (until January), Yin Li (starting January)
- Governor of Yunnan Province – Chen Hao (until December)
- Governor of Zhejiang Province – Li Qiang (until June), Che Jun (starting June)

== Events ==
=== January ===
- January 1 –
  - People's Bank of China Shandong Branch announced will using coin replacing bill in 1 yuan value as testing field in 5 cities including Qingdao, Zaozhuang, Jining, Linyi and Rizhao.
  - China officially transitions from its one-child policy to a two-child policy.
- January 2–9 – 2016 Shenzhen Open
- January 4 – Chinese regulators introduce a circuit breaker in an attempt to prevent stock market crashes, halting trade.
- January – 5 members of Causeway bay books of Hong Kong, including the manager go missing. China's television states that he used to have a name Gui Minhai in committing a hit-and-run crime in 2003. He and his staff went missing mysteriously starts on December 30, 2015, and it's later confirmed that they are all in mainland China.
- January 16 – The Council of Asian Infrastructure Investment Bank established. President Xi Jinping and Premier Li Keqiang master the founding ceremony.
- January 17 – The Beijing Military Region reform as Central Battle Region.
- January 20–25 – A century cold wave hits nearly all parts of China, it is first happened in Siberia, and then goes down to hit China. By January 24, it hits the Southern part of China, Guangzhou, Hong Kong has its first snow in the new century and the ninth of its recorded history. It is described as the Emperor Level Blizzard.
- January 29 – After being trapped for 36 days, four miners are rescued from a collapsed mine in Baotai, Shandong Province.

=== February ===
- February 1 – President Xi Jinping announced that the seven military regions transformed into five battle regions. The five battle regions are Central Battle Region, East Battle Region, West Battle Region, South Battle Region and North Battle Region.
- February 6 – A 6.4 Magnitude earthquake occurs in Kaohsiung, Taiwan.
- February 23–25 – China's Foreign Minister Wang Yi is invited to visit United States. Wang Yi and American General Secretary John Kerry claim that neither China nor US accepts North Korea's nuclear missile proposal. They do not recognize North Korea's Nuclear Status for the cause of Nuclear Non-proliferation Treaty.

=== March ===
- March – National People's Representative Conference and National Political Association Conference (The two-conferences for short) open. President Xi Jinping and Premier Li Keqiang holds the two-conferences.
- March 27 – The National Party of Hong Kong is established. It advocates the independence of Hong Kong and does not recognize the Basic Law of Hong Kong.
- March 28–April 3 – 2016 China Open (snooker)
- March 30 – China deploys anti-ship missiles on Paracel Islands. Spokesman of the Foreign Ministry Hong Lei responded that it's a right thing to do for deploying national defenses equipments on its own territory.

=== April ===
- April – ABU Radio Song Festival 2016
- April 13
  - A building in an industrial zone of Machong County, Dongguan collapse. 18 deaths are reported.
  - 8 Taiwanese criminals out of 10 are sent back to mainland China by Kenya. Taiwanese government protests China's working method. However, the media in Taiwan agree and said the criminals should be seriously punished since the legals in Taiwan are too good for these criminals.
- April 17 – Chinese Central Television broadcasts a report on Changzhou Foreign Languages School stating hundreds of students have fallen ill from pollution.
- April 27 – May 1 – 2016 Extreme Sailing Series in Qingdao

=== May ===
- May 2 – The Cyberspace Administration of China announces an investigation into the death of Wei Zexi, a student who died following experimental treatment for synovial sarcoma he discovered on the search engine Baidu.
- May 3 – Xi Jinping meets with Laotian president Bounnhang Vorachith.
- May 7 – Lei Yang, a Chinese environmentalist, dies after an altercation with police in Changping District, Beijing.
- May 15–22 – 2016 Thomas & Uber Cup in Kunshan, Jiangsu

=== June ===
- June 4 – A tour boat in Guangyuan capsizes, killing a child and leaving 14 missing out of 18 passengers.
- June 12 – A man commits a suicide bombing at the international departure of Shanghai Pudong Airport causes 4 injuries, 1 deadly hurt.
- June 16 – The Shanghai Disney Resort opens.

=== July ===
- July 1 – A Taiwan military ship fires a missile mistakenly. The day is the CPC founding celebration day while CPC founded on July 23, 1921, but for easy remembering, the founding day is set to be July 1.
- July 6 – Hubei province floods.
- July 23 – A woman is killed after attempting to defend her daughter from a tiger at Badaling Wildlife World Park in Beijing. The daughter sustains serious injuries.
- July 24 – The first case of rift valley fever in China is identified.
- July 31 – Cangwu County, Wuzhou, Guangxi earthquakes by 5:18 pm at level 5.4. The center is near Guangzhou 204 kilometers. People in Guangzhou and Shenzhen can sense the quake.

=== August ===
- August – China is going to launch the world's first quantum satellite.
- August 16 - China successfully launched the world's first quantum satellite QUESS" from the Jiuquan Satellite Launch Center in northwestern Gobi Desert at 1:40 a.m. on Tuesday (Aug. 16 ).

=== September ===
- September 4–5 – 2016 G-20 Hangzhou summit
- September 27 – An explosion at a coal mine in Shizuishan kills 18 workers, leaving two missing.
- September 28 – Typhoon Megi makes landfall in mainland China. Major landslides caused by Megi occur in Sucun Village (in Lishui), and Wencheng County.

=== October ===
- October 17 – China launches Shenzhou 11 from Jiuquan Satellite Launch Center, Inner Mongolia.
- October 25 – Illegally stored explosives cause an explosion in a house in northwestern China that kills at least 14 people and injures 147 others in the town of Xinmin in Shaanxi province.
- October 27–30 – 2016 WGC-HSBC Champions in Shanghai

=== November ===
- November 2–3 – Cross-Strait Peaceful Development Forum in Beijing.
- November 3 – China launches Long March 5 from China Wenchang Spacecraft Launch Site, Hainan.

== See also ==
- List of Chinese films of 2016

== See also ==
- 2016 in Chinese music
- List of Chinese films of 2016
