= Meizhen =

Meizhen is a Chinese given name. People with this name include:

- Luo Meizhen (羅美珍; Luó Měizhēn; 1885?–2013), alleged supercentenarian
- Jaime Chik (戚美珍; Qī Měizhēn; born 1962), Hong Kong actress
- Cynthia Koh (许美珍; Xǔ Měizhēn; born 1974), Singaporean actress
- Li Mei-jhen (李眉蓁; Lǐ Méizhēn; born 1979), Taiwanese politician
- Jane Huang (黃美珍; Huáng Měizhēn; born 1983), Taiwanese singer
