= Ningbo Daily =

Chinese newspaper

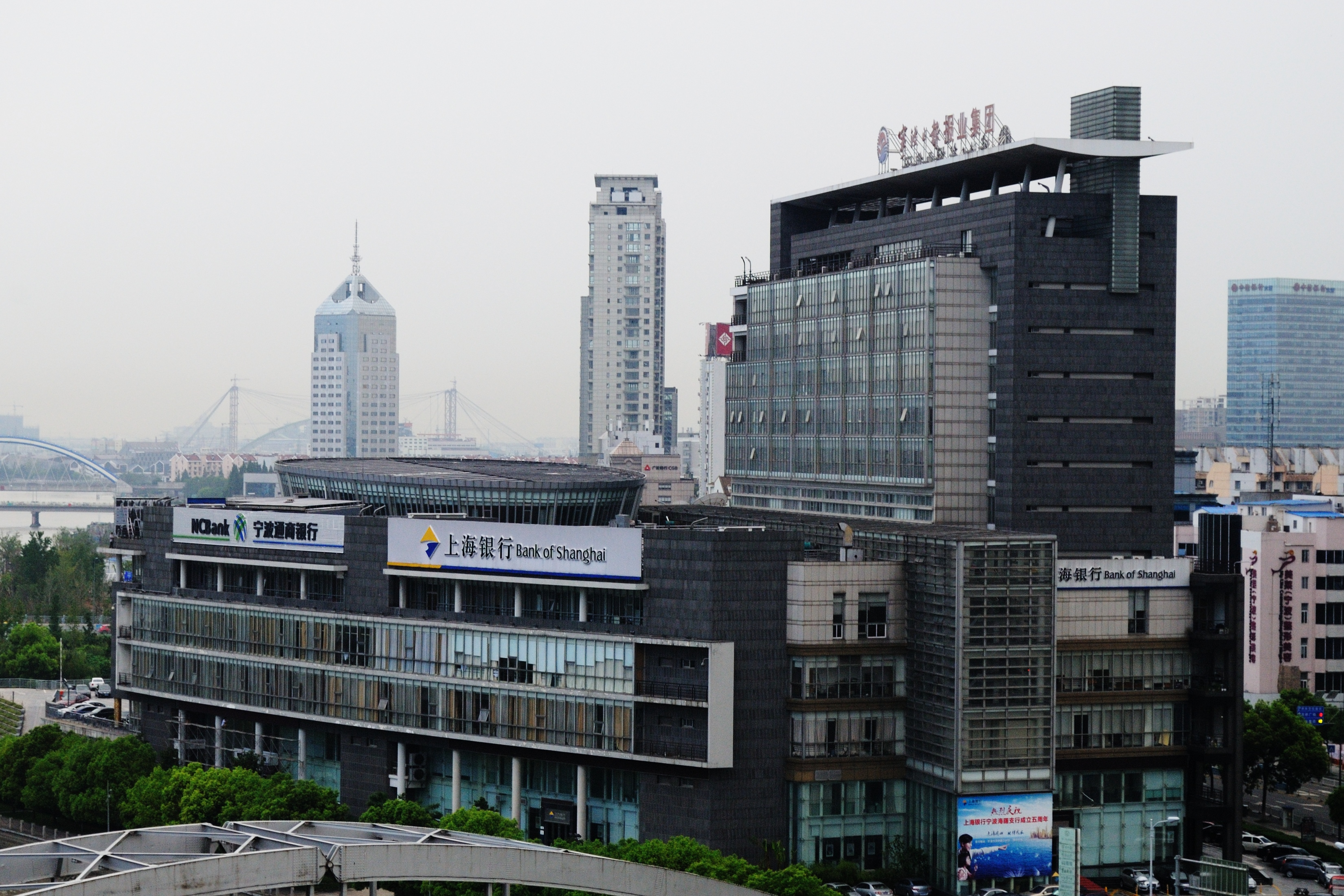
- Headquarters of the Ningbo Daily Group
- Type: Daily newspaper
- Format: Print
- Owner: Ningbo Daily Press Group
- Founded: 1949
- Political alignment: Chinese Communist Party
- Language: Chinese
- Circulation: 250,000
- Website: daily.cnnb.com.cn/nbrb/paperindex.htm

The Ningbo Daily (Chinese: 宁波日报) is a Chinese newspaper published in Ningbo, Zhejiang, China.

== History ==
The newspaper was founded on 8 August 1949 under the name Yongjiang Daily as the official newspaper of the Ningbo Prefectural Committee of the Chinese Communist Party (CCP). In July 1950, Yongjiang Daily merged with Ningbo People's Daily and changed its name to Ningbo Times. In September 1951, Ningbo Times was renamed Ningbo Dazhong, and in October 1972, it ceased publication. After the 3rd plenary session of the 11th Central Committee of the Chinese Communist Party, Ningbo News resumed publication on 1 June 1980, and was co-sponsored by the Ningbo Municipal Committee of the CCP. On New Year's Day 1983, Ningbo News changed its name to Ningbo Daily.

After the establishment of Ningbo Daily Newspaper Group, on 21 June 2002, Ningbo Daily was changed to be owned by Ningbo Daily Newspaper Group. In March 2018, Ningbo Daily won the Third National Top 100 Newspapers in China.

== Controversies ==
During the 2012 protests against the PX project in Zhenhai District, Ningbo, the Ningbo Daily published an article claiming that citizen demonstrations undermined the stability and development of the overall situation, causing dissatisfaction among the demonstrators.
