= 2012 Zhongshan riot =

Riot in Zhongshan, Guangdong, China

- Part of protest and dissent in China
- Date: 25 June 2012
- Location: Shaxi, Zhongshan, Guangdong
- Caused by: Conflict between immigrants and locals and allegations of police brutality
- Result: the riot was suppressed by the People's Armed Police

Parties
local people	Government of China: Ministry of Public Security; Local police; People's Armed Police

Casualties and losses
over 100 injuries (according to BBC)	

The 2012 Zhongshan riot occurred on and following June 25, 2012 in the Shaxi district of Zhongshan, in China's Guangdong province. Sparked by a fight between a migrant teen from Sichuan and a local schoolboy, the violence snowballed into a major riot by hundreds of mostly Sichuanese workers as tensions between migrant workers and natives boiled over.

== Background ==
According to the Wall Street Journal, more than 24 million migrants from other parts of China live in Guangdong, one of China's richest provinces, while an addition 10 million have moved from poor to rich areas within the province. Migrants generally do not receive local services like healthcare and education, because their household registration, or hukou, shows them as living in their original village. Tensions have frequently arisen between migrants and locals due to attendant issues, especially since migrants are often suspected of criminality and suffer abuse from local police. Many local towns and even cities recognize that they would not be able to afford offering the same services to migrants as they offer to legal residents.

== Riot ==
The riot reportedly began after police arrested and allegedly abused a teenager from Chongqing who was accused of beating up a local schoolboy. The South China Morning Post reported online allegations that the teenager had frequently extorted students for cash, threatening them with violence if they refused. A crowd of migrants gathered, and then at some point began to rampage, destroying police cars, looting shops, and attacking local people. Within two days, the city had been placed under lockdown, with hundreds of military and security personnel in the area. Despite vehement denials by Chinese officials, locals reported that many were wounded in the riot and that several had been killed when security forces intervened.

== See also ==
- 2011 Zhili riot
- 2011 Zhongshan riot
