= Changzhou Senior High School =

- 江苏省常州高级中学

Location
- 8 Luohan Road; Changzhou, Jiangsu; China
- Coordinates: 31.7791°N 119.9629°E

Information
- Type: high school
- Motto: 存诚 能贱 (Honesty and Modesty)
- Established: 1907
- Principal: 曹新悦
- Affiliation: Changzhou Foreign Languages School
- Website: czsz.cn

Changzhou Senior High School (Chinese: 江苏省常州高级中学) was founded on November 15, 1907. It is located in downtown of Changzhou, itself a city with 2500 years of history, and adjacent to the picturesque local attractions Hongmei Park and Tianning Temple. In a 2016 ranking of Chinese high schools which sent students to American universities, the high school ranked number 49th.

== History ==
The historic precursor of Changzhou Senior High School was Changzhou Institution (常州府学), founded in CE 756. It was transformed to Changzhou Secondary School (常州府中学堂) in 1907. The school endured the wars and the disorder of society in the first few decades in the 20th century. With several changes in nomenclature and pedagogical systems, the school has evolved to Changzhou Senior High School as it is today. With more than 400,000 alumni in over the century since its modern founding, notables of many fields in the nation count Changzhou as their secondary alma mater.

== Notable alumni ==
=== Political leaders ===
- Qu Qiubai (1899–1935)
- Zhang Tailei (1898–1927)
- Hu Ping (1930 -): Zhejiang Jiaxing people. A former Fujian province, Department of Commerce minister.
- Jiang Zhuping (1937 -): Jiangsu Yixing people. A former Hubei provincial governor, secretary of the CPC Hubei Provincial Committee book.

=== Scholars ===
- Liu Bannong (1891–1934), famous modern poet, a prominent figure in the New Culture Movement.
- Liu Tianhua (1895–1932): musician. Jiangsu Jiangyin people, 1909-1911 study in the school. 1915-1922 taught in school. A former Peking University, Professor at such schools.
- Ch'ien Mu (1895–1990): a Chinese historian, educator, philosopher and Confucian considered one of the greatest historians and philosophers in 20th-century China.
- Ling Chun-sheng (1902–1981), the national scientists, Academia Sinica. Jiangsu Wu Jin people. School graduation in 1919. Served as the first Director in Ethnic Studies at the Academia Sinica.
- Lu Shuxiang (1904–1998): linguist. Jiangsu Danyang City people. School graduation in 1922. A former researcher at the Institute, Chinese Academy of Languages, the Director. His major works include "Chinese grammar slightly" and so on.
- Zhou Youguang (1906–2017): spoken and written language scientist. Jiangsu Province Changzhou people. Graduated in 1923.
- Tao Jinchao (1908–1992): jurist. Jiangsu Liyang people. School graduation in 1926. Served as the legal system of the Fifth National People's Congress Standing Committee and deputy director.
- Tao Lu Jia (1917 -): high-ranking Communist Party. Jiangsu Liyang people. The thirties in the school reading. Served as first secretary of the CPC Shanxi Provincial Committee.
- Yun Zhiwei (1982 -): Professor of Mathematics at MIT specializing in number theory, algebraic geometry and representation theory. Have won SASTRA Ramanujan Prize in 2012.

=== Fellow ===
- Pan Shu (1897–1988): Chinese Academy of Sciences. Psychologists. Jiangsu Yixing people. Graduate school in 1917. Former Nanjing principal, director of Chinese Academy of Sciences Institute of Psychology.
- Wu Rukang (1916 -): Chinese Academy of Sciences. Anthropologist. Jiangsu Province Changzhou people. Graduate school in 1935. Of Vertebrate Paleontology and Paleoanthropology Chinese Academy of Sciences Institute, Deputy Director.
- Chen Taiyi (1921 -): Chinese Academy of Engineering. Communications systems engineering experts. Jiangsu Yixing people. 1933-1934 school years in the school. A former People's Liberation Army Nanjing Institute of Communications Engineering Vice-President.
- Hou Yunde (1929 -): Chinese Academy of Engineering. Virologist. Jiangsu Province Changzhou people. Graduate school in 1948. China Preventive Medicine research scientist.

=== Others ===
- Tang Jun (1962 -): Jiangsu Changzhou people. Served as Microsoft Company (China) CEO. Graduate school in 1980.

== Notable Teachers ==
- Lu Simian (1884–1957): a prominent Chinese historian.

== Past Principals ==
- Tu Yuan Bo (1907–1913)
- Tong Bo Zhang (1913–1925)
- Shi Shaoxi (1951–1966, 1978–1985)
- Ding Haosheng (1985–2000)
- Han Tao (2001–2003)
- Wang Dingxin (2003–2008)
- Ding Weiming (2008-2010)
- Zhang Yaoqi (2010-2014)
- Shi Pinnan (2014- )
