= China PX protest =

Series of protests against chemical factories in China

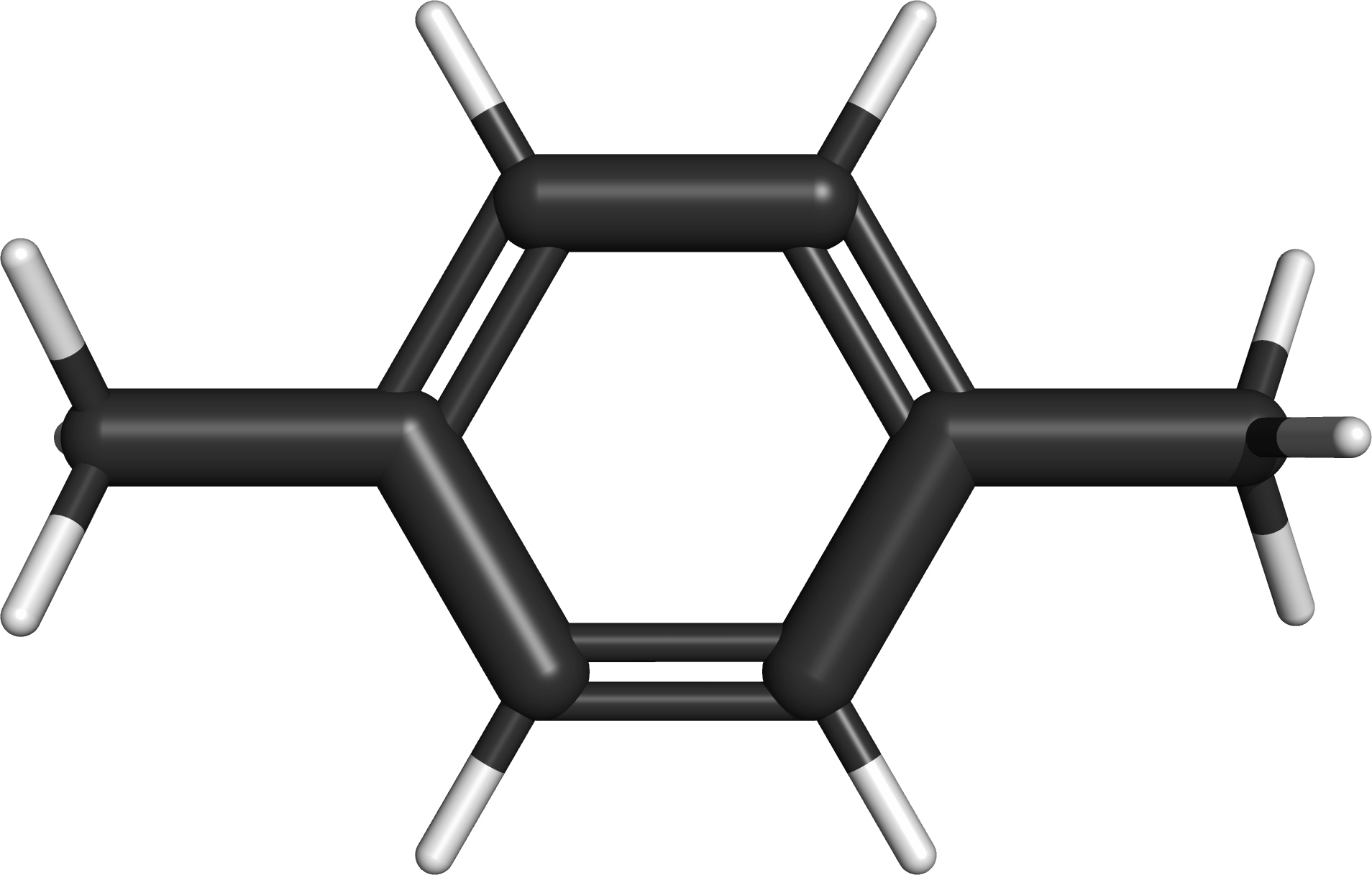
- Para-xylene sticks-model
- Date: 2007–2014
- Location: Xiamen, Dalian, Kunming, Maoming
- Caused by: Public dissatisfaction with the potential environmental and health threats posed by PX projects
- Result: Project cancellation, relocation or suspension

Parties
Protesters against PX projects	Government of China: People's Police; Riot police; Special Police Unit; People's Armed Police; Ministry of State Security

Casualties
- Injuries: At least 100 (exact number unconfirmed)
- Arrested: At least 70 (exact number unconfirmed)

The China PX protest is a series of public demonstrations against the presence of para-xylene (PX) chemical factories in several Chinese cities, including Xiamen, Dalian, Ningbo, Kunming and Maoming among them.

The protests arose from the concern and fear of the residents in these cities about the environmental and health risks of PX. Citizens organised strolls and marches of various scales through text messages and social media to demand that the municipal and central governments relocate or terminate the PX projects.

== PX market in China ==
=== PX demand ===
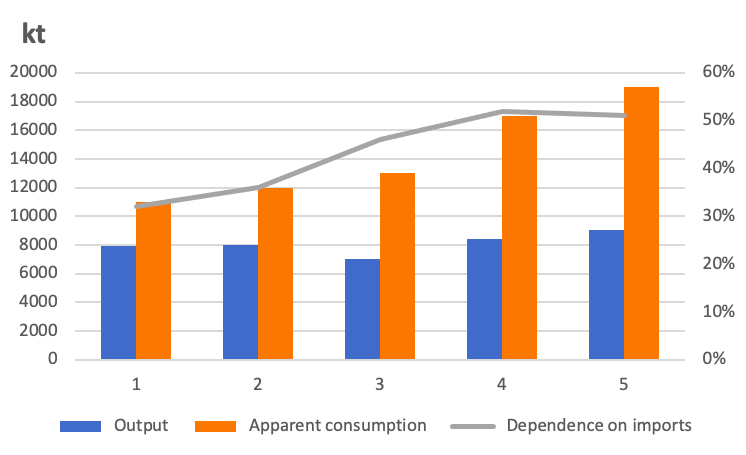
China's apparent consumption and output of PX in 2010–2014.

Para-xylene is an aromatic hydrocarbon, used primarily as a raw material in the manufacture of purified terephthalic acid (PTA) and dimethyl terephthalate (DMT). Since 2010, China has been the world's largest PX consumer. From 1992 to 2005, the annual consumption of PX in China grew by 16.36%.

China's consumption of PX in DMT production has declined since 2013. Almost all PX is concentrated in the PTA sector for the production of polyester. In 2015, China's consumption of polyester reached 37.04 million tons. China's demand for PX was expected to climb to 26.5 million tons by 2020.

=== PX supply ===
Demand for PX has been increasing due to the rapid development of China's polyester and PTA sectors. However, domestic output has remained rather stagnant. In 2005, China's demand exceeded internal supply by 1.55 million tons and the deficit was met mainly by imports. The country's apparent consumption of PX was 16.572 million tons in 2013, which showed an increase of 19.9% over the previous year. Output was 7.7 million tons, the same as in 2012. From 2010 to 2014, apparent consumption increased by nearly 8 million tons, whilst output only increased by slightly more than 1 million tons.

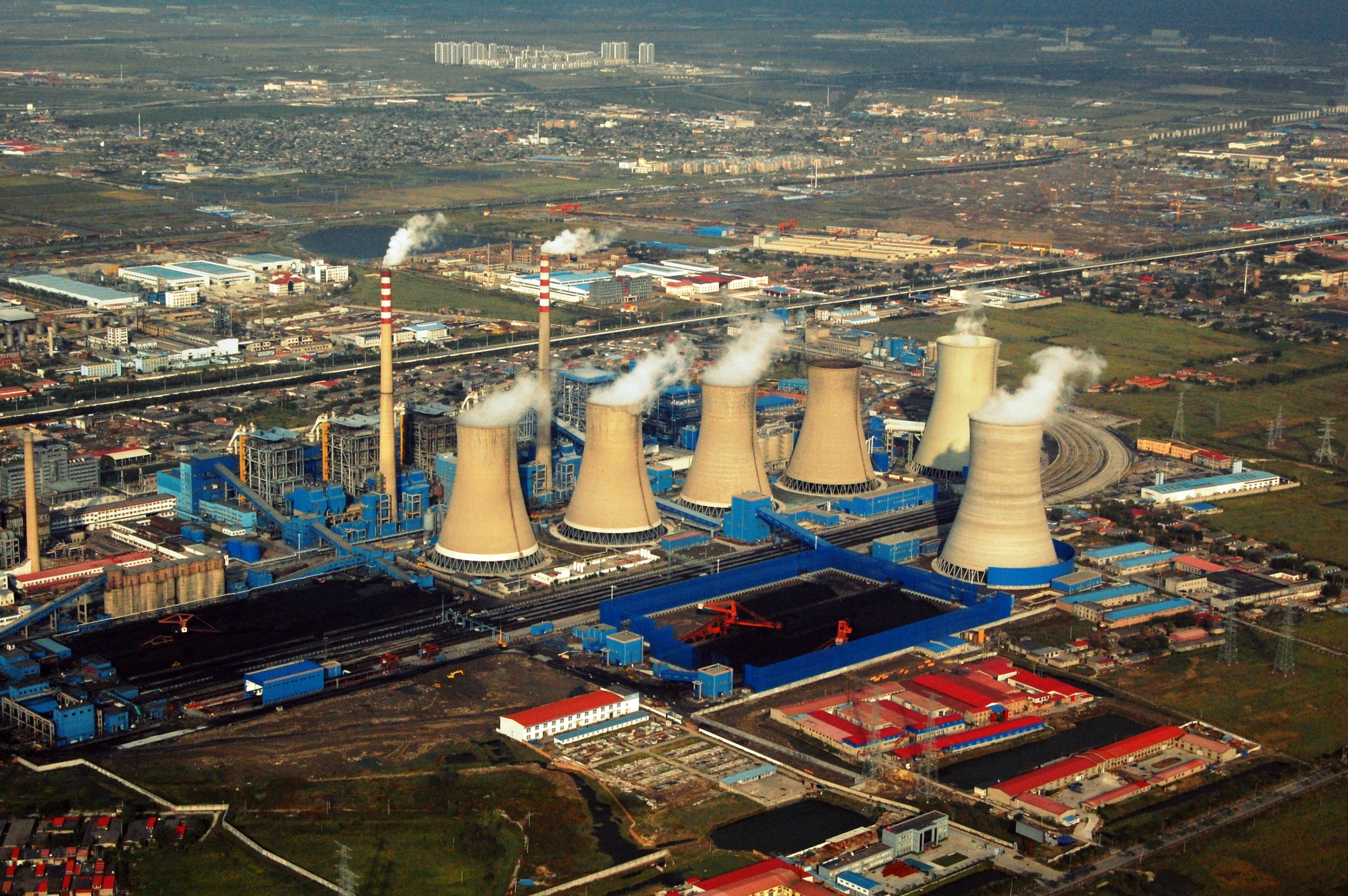
Power Plant in Tianjin, China

By 2015, Sinopec and China National Petroleum Corporation (CNPC) were the two largest holders, which accounted for nearly 71.3% of Chinese PX production capacity. By 2014, China had 15 proposals for new facilities and expansion of existing ones, with a combined production capacity of 12.42 million tons. In 2015, a number of PX projects in preparation were approved by the National Development and Reform Commission (NRDC), which is a macroeconomic management agency under the Chinese State Council. Most of them were still in the preliminary stage due to growing awareness of environmental concern and strong public opposition. As a result, the supply shortfall has continued to widen.

=== PX imports ===
China has relied heavily on PX imports to satisfy domestic demand. In 2014, imported PX supplied more than 50% of the country's total market demand. In 2015, China's dependence on imported PX rose to 56%, and profits were lost in the import process. Major sources included Korea and Japan, which accounted for 94.1% of the total imports in 2005. The third-largest source is Taiwan. In 2015, these three sources together provided 8.93 million tons, equivalent to 76.7% of the total. It has been expected that China would continue to import greater quantities of PX.

== Protests ==
=== 2007 Xiamen protest ===
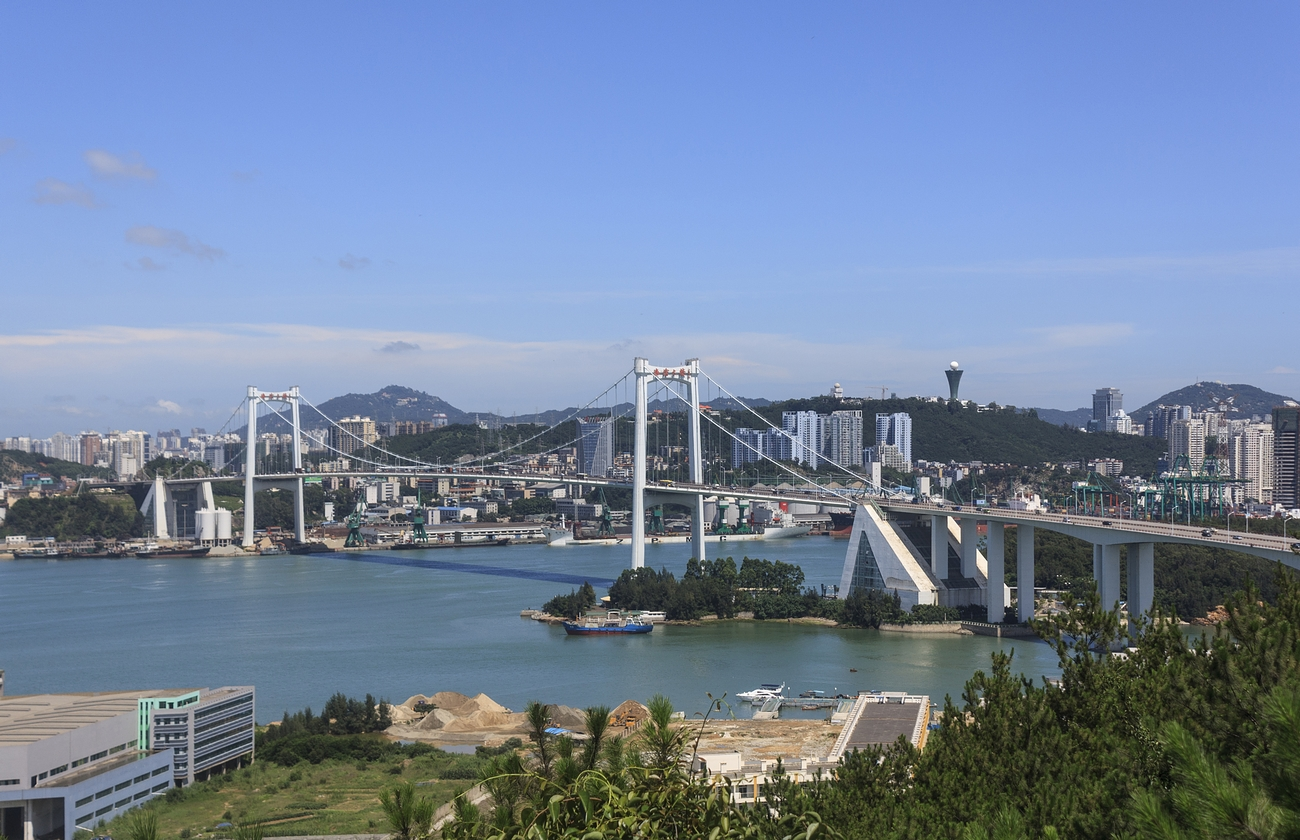
Photograph of Haicang District, Xiamen City, the original location for the proposed PX plant.

In 2004, the Chinese State Council approved the proposal to construct the biggest PX plant in the world in Haicang District, Xiamen city, Fujian Province. It was estimated to produce 800,000 tons of PX by the end of 2008, and to generate 80 billion yuan annually, one-fourth of Xiamen's GDP. On 26 May, the Xiamen municipal government announced its approval for the PX project. Construction started on 27 May.

On 1 June 2007, 8,000 to 10,000 citizens took to the streets and demanded the municipality abandon the PX project. The protestors included 105 national committee members and dozens of university presidents and academicians. Zhao Yufen, the youngest woman elected to the Chinese Academy of Sciences and a professor at Xiamen University, also participated in the march. She was regarded as the catalyst who transformed "the small-scale and sporadic petitions and complaints" into "public campaigns".

This was the first, large-scale anti-PX protest in China. Although there were already 13 PX plants by late 2009, most of them established before 2007, large-scale movements against PX projects did not occur until the Xiamen case. Since then, most governmental attempts to construct new PX plants have faced public resistance. Earlier anti-PX protests spawned subsequent ones, underpinning a movement continuity against future PX projects in China. A local propaganda department official attributed the increased difficulty of promoting PX to the influence of preceding protests. Various other cities stated that the Xiamen protest served as "an inspiration and model for the protests in which they participated". The Xiamen case is often referred to as "the milestone in public participation in China".

=== 2011 Dalian protest ===
In 2003, the National Revitalisation Strategy of the Old Industrial Bases in Northeast China listed the petrochemical industry as a priority for the region's economic development. Dalian was part of that region. In September 2005, Dalian municipality signed a contract with Fujia Company, a private enterprise, to establish a new joint company named Fujia Dahua Petrochemical Company. On 28 September, the Fujia PX project was formally approved by the State Environmental Protection Administration. In December, the NRDC approved its construction. This project was established by the NDRC as a key project in the Eleventh Five-Year Plan (2006–2010).

On 16 July 2010, an explosion in an oil storage depot belonging to the CNPC occurred, and 1,500 tons of oil were spilled into the Yellow Sea. On 8 August 2011, Typhoon Muifa damaged one of the PX plant's protective dykes. Fearing PX leakage, residents of Dalian organised a "stroll" (used as a euphemism for "protest" in China to avoid censorship) in People's Square using Weibo microblogs, Twitter, blogs and Internet forums to spread the message. On 14 August, around 12,000 people gathered in the city square to protest, demanding the factory be immediately shut down and relocated, and that investigation into the factory be made public.

=== 2012 Ningbo protest ===
Ningbo suffered from the poor performance of small and medium enterprises after the 2008 financial crisis. To stimulate the slowed economy of Ningbo, the municipal government decided on the development of petrochemical and other heavy industries as the new engine of growth. The plan included an integrated oil refining and ethylene production project for the Zhenhai Refining and Chemical Company. A 55.9-billion-yuan PX production unit was planned for Zhenhai, a rural town 7.5 kilometres (4.7 mi) from the urban area of Ningbo. This installation constituted a minor part of the overall project.

The Zhenhai district was surrounded by several industry development zones. It had seen a rising death rate associated with cancer-related diseases, which was a subject of major concern for locals even before the protest started. The introduction of the chemical plant served as "the final straw that breaks the camel's back".

Many Ningbo residents worried that the construction of the PX plant would cause serious pollution. Some believed that the Ningbo government did not properly assess the project's environmental impacts. The movement originated from a small-scale protest in nearby Zhenhai County in which local peasants sought increased compensation from the local government. As the news regarding the PX plant spread among more Ningbo residents, it triggered larger street demonstrations in the urban area with more than 5,000 participants on 27 and 28 October. The entire protest lasted for four days.

=== 2013 Kunming protest ===
In 2008, the CNPC planned to construct a ten-million-ton oil refining plant in Gaopu Zhen of Anning city, 40 kilometres (25 mi) away from Kunming, the capital of Yunnan province. With an investment of 20 billion yuan, the plant was to produce 6.5 million tons of PX annually. It would also produce an annual output of 200 billion yuan, equivalent to 20% of the provincial GDP. The local government welcomed the refinery as a source of local economic growth through heavy industry.

For the first five years, this project had been conducted in a closed-door manner until it surfaced publicly in February 2013. Kunming Daily, a local newspaper, reported that the project had been approved by the NRDC. This news, in combination with the past cases in the other cities including Xiamen, Dalian and Ningbo, aroused citizens' concerns about the environmental and health hazards caused by PX production. They also expressed worry that this water-intensive industry would exacerbate Kunming's drought problem. In response to public concern, the municipal government held a press conference on 29 March. The spokesman stated that the project had passed the strictest examination and approval.

Shortly after this, two local non-governmental organisations (NGOs), Green Watershed and Green Kunming, dispatched representatives to Anning to conduct fieldwork on the refinery project. During one of the conversations with local officials, the NGOs asked for the disclosure of the environmental impact assessment report. However, this request was refused on the ground that the report was classified as a national secret.

In late April, heated online debates and details of a prospective protest began to occupy social media platforms. On 4 May, 3,000 participants gathered in Nanping Square, located in the center of Kunming, to demonstrate their opposition. No violent confrontations between local residents and police officials took place. On 16 May, a second protest was organised with more than 200 participants. It ended peacefully, which marked the conclusion of this movement. The Kunming case is considered as a "landmark in terms of isolated anti-PX protests developing over time into a sustained movement. In 2014, China Environment Report, the national official newspaper owned by China's Ministry of Environmental Protection, named the Kunming case as one of the ten landmark events of 2013.

=== 2014 Maoming protest ===
In 2011, the PX project in Maoming co-sponsored by the municipal government and Sinopec Company was first proposed. A 3.5-billion-yuan budget was allocated to construct this petro-chemical base with the capacity for 0.6 million tons of PX production annually. It was approved by the NRDC in October 2012. Completion of the project was scheduled for 2014.

One month before the outbreak of the protest, the local government started to wage campaigns to emphasise the importance of PX for people's daily life and the economic benefit of the project. Twenty press releases, including "Knowledge about PX", "Demystifying PX", and "Is PX really harmful", were published in Maoming Daily. The municipality also demanded the public sign an agreement letter to "support the project, not believe or spread rumours, not express oppositional opinions, and not participate in protest activities in relation to the project". Scepticism of the government's intense propaganda and overzealousness grew among Maoming residents. This prompted them to search for more information about PX, leading them to discover the collective resistance to similar projects in other cities.

On the morning of 30 March 2014, more than 1,000 people gathered in front of the City Hall to protest over the planned PX plant. The number grew to roughly 7,000 by the evening, at which point a violent clash and military countermeasures occurred. The protest continued for approximately a week till 7 April. It was the first anti-PX protest in China that engendered bloody confrontation.

== Media evaluation and public opinion ==
=== International media ===
Since 2007 when anti-PX protest first came to public notice, foreign media have kept close updates of the movements. BBC News covered the Dalian, Kunming, Shanghai and Maoming protests. It particularly reported the police confrontations and violent encounters, which were precluded in majority of mainland mainstream media. The news agency Reuters reported that Chinese authorities had blocked searches for the terms "PX", "Dalian" and "Dalian protests" on Weibo. The Guardian and Radio Liberty also featured a few articles.

=== Domestic media ===
Domestic media are media outlets that operate within China's territory, either government-sponsored and state-controlled television and newspaper such as CCTV, or commercial media such as Southern Weekly. Before the protests, these platforms were mostly used to promote PX and pre-empt the emergence of social movements, under the government propaganda department's instructions. They usually publicised the economic benefits, but rarely mentioned the possible negative consequences of the PX plants. Following the mass demonstrations, few of them covered the issue due to censorship.

Despite local censorship, streams of information on the PX projects reached local residents via alternative channels over the Internet, including overseas sources and personal blogs from other cities. Traditional media decided to join in the coverage of the movements later, as public opinion shifted and international media began extensive coverage. This acted as a catalyst to further encourage public opposition of PX projects, as some perceived this change as the cessation of censorship and an admission of the danger of PX by the authorities.

For the first month following the Ningbo protest, the movement received limited domestic media coverage as a result of the government's censorship. Terms such as "Ningbo", "Zhenhai" and "Chemical Plant" were blocked on Weibo. After that, different domestic media outlets addressed the protest in various ways. The South China Morning Post and the Associated Press described the movement as a "liberal resistance initiated by China's middle class". Xinhua News Agency and China Daily initially defended the government by labelling the protest as an "unfortunate incident participated by irrational citizens". As the protest ended with the municipality's concession, both of them concluded it was "a call for environmental protection and democracy".

In multiple cases, national and regional level newspapers, such as People's Daily, Guangming Daily and China News Service, chose to express their support by commenting that the PX projects should be removed. For example, regarding the Kunming protest, they criticised the government's regulation which required the citizens to register to buy masks and t-shirts as a measure to stifle protests.

== Government response ==
=== 2007–2013 protests ===
The anti-PX protests in Xiamen, Dalian, Ningbo and Kunming are generally considered successful. The governments in these four cities all eventually adopted a moderate response by either abandoning, suspending or relocating the PX projects.

In response to the Xiamen protest, the local government initially attempted to censor media coverage, but the event quickly drew international attention due to the participation of elites. On 8 December, six months after the protest, the municipality opened an online voting system for citizens to express their opinions about the chemical plant. Although 55,376 voters opposed the project and 3,078 voters supported it, the government decided not to accept this result because of a technical flaw in the system. At the end of December, Xiamen municipality eventually announced the relocation of the PX plant to the Gulei Peninsula in Zhangzhou, another southern Fujian city.

After the large-scale protest in Dalian, PX became a forbidden keyword on social media, and no news reports on the Fujia PX plant were released. Subsequently, the municipality adopted a tension reduction strategy to calm residents. On 29 October 2012, they announced that the project was permanently suspended due to public opposition, and that "all relevant petrochemical enterprises would be removed to Changxing Island Industrial Park". However, in December 2012, it was reported that the plant was still in operation.

In the Ningbo case, the government started with censoring all related discussions online. This strategy appeared to be ineffective, as the protest received significant attention from the global press and created public pressure on the municipality. On 29 October 2012, the Ningbo municipal government announced that the project was permanently suspended due to public opposition. Although the plant had already been constructed, the government immediately terminated the expansion.

In Kunming, the municipality and the provincial government were dissatisfied with the fact that the province had to import large amounts of refined oil from other regions of China. The refinery and the PX plant in Kunming were key projects in remediating this problem. The higher-level governments all supported the advancement of the debated project, limiting the possibilities for local governments to abandon or relocate the projects. Shortly after the protest, several television programmes were produced to illustrate the harmlessness of PX. The government decided to engage with the public by promising that certain actions would be taken to reduce environmental damage. This communication ceased after June 2013, and there was a lack of follow-up information about the construction of the refinery or the promised actions.

=== 2014 Maoming protest ===
The Maoming protest was the first anti-PX protest to experience police crackdowns. The protesters were frustrated by the municipality's propaganda, having seen the governmental compromises in the other four cities, Xiamen, Dalian, Ningbo and Kunming, through digital media. They believed that their city should not be the home for something that was unwanted by other places.

At the beginning of the protest, the municipal government chose not to respond to the movement. Disgruntled with the authorities' silence, in the afternoon some young protesters began throwing eggs and mineral water bottles at the police lined up in front of the government building, and a small number of participants blocked the traffic at the main thoroughfares. The government responded with anti-riot equipment, tear gas, batons and pepper water to stop the protesters from attacking police and destroying public facilities. An eyewitness claimed that "the situation was chaotic. Five policemen roughed up one protester until he could no longer stand".

In early April 2014, the Maoming government conceded by offering a vague promise that the PX project would not proceed until "a consensus among citizens is reached". However, by June 2014 there had been no follow-up news.

== See also ==
- Dalian PX protest
