= Ding Jinhao engraving scandal =

2013 vandalism scandal in Luxor Temple, Egypt

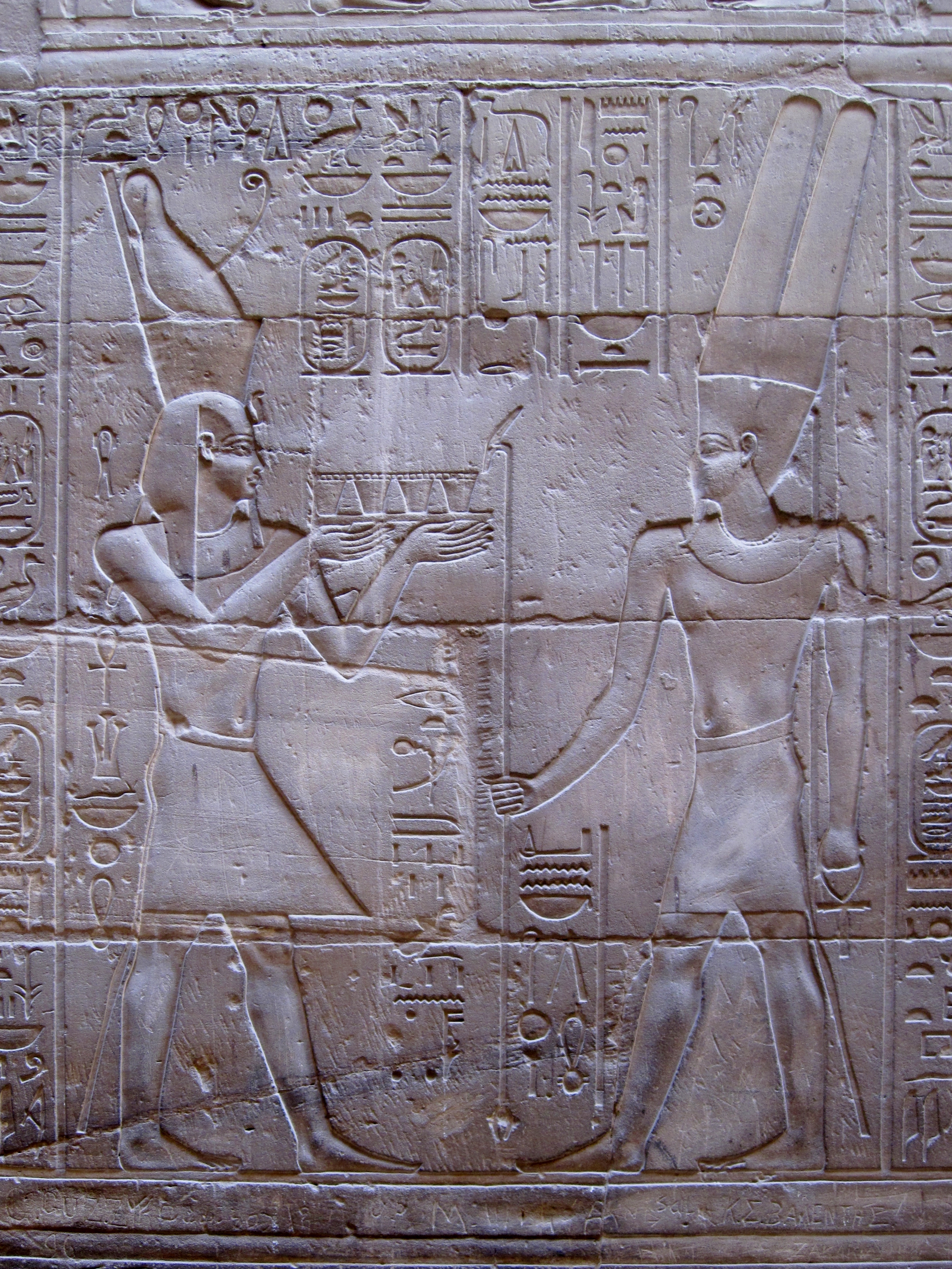
The engraving at the Luxor Temple where the incident took place.

The Ding Jinhao engraving scandal was a 2013 scandal revolving around Ding Jinhao, a then 15-year-old Chinese boy who scratched the Chinese characters "Ding Jinhao was here" (Chinese: 丁锦昊到此一游) on an engraving in the ancient Luxor Temple in Egypt.

== Media response ==
On May 24, 2013, a verified user of the Chinese social media site Weibo, posted a picture of the ancient engraving, vandalised with the letters "Ding Jinhao was here" (Chinese: 丁锦昊到此一游). The etching appeared on the wall of the Luxor Temple, which was built in Luxor, Egypt under Pharaoh Amenhotep III in the 14th century B.C. and later under Rameses II. The post quickly drew attention and outrage, including 90,000 reposts and 18,000 comments, and prompted wide coverage in Chinese media.

The following day, online users found and exposed personal information of Ding Jinhao, in an online manhunt known as the "human flesh search engine". On May 26, the website of Ding's school was hacked by online vigilantes so that visitors had to click a pop-up window that said "Ding Jinhao was here" to reach the homepage. Ding's parents did an interview with the Modern Express Post to apologize, saying that Ding Jinhao had spent the past night in tears over the incident. Ding was younger when he vandalised the temple, and the public shaming was "too much pressure for him to take", they said.

People's Daily, newspaper of China's ruling Communist Party, published an article decrying the incident and the behavior of Chinese tourists: "Nowadays, people in China no longer want for food and clothing" ... "But many people also feel as though their 'hands are full but hearts are empty.' In the process of modernization, how have the people come to lack modern manners and consciousness?".

Xinhua News Agency reported that the temple was able to partially clean Ding Jinhao's vandalism from the temple site.

== Government response ==
- Hong Lei, spokesperson for the Ministry of Foreign Affairs of the People's Republic of China, responded to the scandal by calling on Chinese citizens travelling abroad to comply with local laws and regulations and to behave in a civil manner.
- The China National Tourism Administration also responded to the incident by posting a reminder on its official site imploring Chinese tourists intending to travel to domestic and overseas destinations to behave in a civil manner, and included a list of tips that would help them to do so.

== Related law ==
According to the Egyptian Protection of cultural relics law, the posting of advertisements and posters at the heritage, writing, engraving, or smudging of cultural relics at heritage sites is prohibited and punishable by a jail term of three months up to a year in prison, and fine of E£100 to E£500 (US$14–71).
