= 2011 Shanghai Truckers strike =

Protest in Shanghai, China

The 2011 Shanghai Truckers strike started in the Waigaoqiao zone of Pudong in Shanghai, China, on the morning of April 20, 2011, and continued for two days.

The work stoppage was preceded by a gathering in Songjiang District on April 13 to protest the alleged beating of a pedestrian by state officials. There were further strikes called in other port cities. Reports that three truckers were killed were denied by state controlled media.

== See also ==
- List of civil disturbances in the People's Republic of China (2011)
