= 2011 Yunnan protest =

Land dispute in Yunnan, China

The 2011 Yunnan protest occurred from March 25 to March 29, 2011, in Suijiang County, Yunnan, People's Republic of China. This event, formally known as the 2011 Yunnan Protest, occurred as a land dispute after the government seized land which was to be grounds for the development of a new power plant. This event was considered a land protest as the civilians protested in protection of the land they lived and worked on.

This protest was not the first of its kind that occurred in the Yunnan province. Land related protests had been on the rise for two years between civilians and government forces before this particular event occurred in 2011. The power plant that was the source of the 2011 protest was set to be a coal plant and a concern of pollution became cause for protest.

This protest, similar to other land protests which occurred in the Yunnan Province, was deemed violent by protesters as riot police wore body armor, unleashed tear gas, and beat protesters. There were allegations that the protests resulted in the targeted deaths of protesters. These protests had been a major source of unrest across the Yunnan Province and in other areas of China as the safety of civilian protesters was harmed and reports of injuries and death tolls rose. Other incidents of the Yunnan protest include storming government buildings, blocking highways, and vandalizing cars. These events all resulted in police intervention.

These protests continued for several days and spread into surrounding provinces, such as Haimen and Wukan in the Guangdong Province as the government released plans to expand the coal power plant into surrounding areas. The protests continued over a loss of land and a concern of pollution to the air and surrounding ground and drinking water supplies, which may cause bodily harm to civilians. Protests, similar to the Yunnan Protest, over land continued across China for a couple more years as civilians struggled against the government over land being seized to make space for a growing number of power plants.

The results of these protests involved a victory for local officials and developers as the specific power plants which were protested were still built and other plans for development continued on. Some civilians who were subject to pollution and forced to drink contaminated drinking water received some compensation, but for the most part their protests were ignored and their demands were not met. Local officials continue to ignore protests for protection from pollution. Issues regarding pollution have begun to affect not only the health of individuals, but has also barred them access to medical treatment as after the protests some were denied access to blood screenings and other tests which may have shown the extent of the damage caused by continual exposure to pollutants.

Protests in this area also continued over a general unrest and distrust of local officials. The protesters across these various provinces felt a deep disloyalty towards local officials as their land was constantly being seized and sold to developers and they were at risk of dangerous pollution. Many protesters fought beyond the issues of development and power plants and demanded a right to elect their own local officials. These demands most often were not seen through as local civilians were not given an option to choose their own officials and development continued to occur at a regular pace.

== Dispute ==
About 40,000 Suijiang and 60,000 Pingshan County, Sichuan residents were forced to relocate to make way for a power station. The Xiangjiaba facility is located at the upper reaches of the Yangtze River in Yunnan. The dispute began with issues of compensations.

== Protest ==
About 1,500 armed police officers were sent to Suijiang county. Up to 30 protesters and 20 policemen were wounded in the clashes. There were about 2,000 protesters according to the government. According to the villagers, at its peak there were 7,000 protesters. They started throwing bricks, and armoured vehicles were sent to the scene.
