= Liang Tianzhu =

Chinese painter (1916–2011)

Liang Tianzhu (Chinese: 梁天柱; pinyin: Liáng Tiānzhù) (1916–2011) was a Chinese painter. Born to a peasant from Qingdao in Shandong province, Liang was originally a doctor, and later learned to paint. He was influenced by Huang Binhong. After retirement, he travelled; visiting famous scenic spots in China. A trip to Dunhuang inspired him to develop his innovations in Chinese landscape paintings.

Art theorist Wang Luxiang said: "Liang Tianzhu’s creative exploration will exert a tremendous influence on Chinese landscape painting." The traditional Chinese painting artist Zhang Ding said "Liang should be considered as the greatest discovery after Huang Qiuyuan and Chen Zizhuang in contemporary Chinese landscape painting field."

In 1991, Chinese Painting Research Institute (now China National Academy of painting) awarded Liang the first Special Painter.

Liang's works have a spacious, vigorous personal style, which formed a new pattern of contemporary Chinese landscape painting.
