= 2013 Shanghai shooting =

Spree shooting in Shanghai, China

- Location of Baoshan District (red) within the city of Shanghai
- Location: Shanghai, China
- Date: 22 June 2013
- Attack type: Mass shooting, bludgeoning
- Weapons: Hunting rifle; QBZ-95 Assault rifle; Metal pipe
- Deaths: 6
- Injuries: 4
- Perpetrator: Fan Jieming

On 22 June 2013, a man committed a spree killing in Shanghai, China. Six people died and four others were injured. The perpetrator fatally beat a coworker at the Guangyu fine chemical company in Shanghai's Baoshan District, and then shot to death one person in Pudong District. The perpetrator shot and killed one person in Baoshan, and then returned to the fine chemical company where he shot to death three more people before being apprehended. The perpetrator, 62-year-old Fan Jieming, was sentenced to death and executed in 2016.

== Details ==
The attacker beat a colleague to death at the Guangyu fine chemical company, located in Baoshan. He retrieved a hunting rifle that had been hidden in his dormitory, and then asked a taxi cab driver to take him to Pudong. When the cab stopped in Pudong, the attacker shot the driver to death and drove the vehicle back to Baoshan. In Baoshan, he shot and killed a soldier who was guarding the entrance to a barracks and stole his gun. The suspect then returned to the factory and shot dead three more people, including a manager who may have also been one of the factory's owners.

== Perpetrator ==
The perpetrator was 62-year-old Fan Jieming, the chemical company's security manager and a military veteran. According to Shanghai police, the rampage may have been motivated by an economic dispute. On 29 June 2015, Fan was convicted and sentenced to death for six counts of murders, attempted murder, robbery, and robbery of firearms. He was executed in June 2016.
