= 2011 Zengcheng riot =

Riot in China

The 2011 Zengcheng riot (6•11事件) began on June 10, 2011, in Xintang town (新塘镇), Zengcheng, Guangdong, China. The demonstrators were mainly migrant workers in Xintang.

== Background ==
On June 10, 2011, a 20-year-old pregnant woman named Wang Lianmei (王联梅) was manhandled by security personnel in front of a supermarket in Dadun village, Xintang. The security personnel was hired by the local government. In the scuffle the woman fell to the ground and her husband Tang Xuecai (唐学才) was beaten. Both are from Sichuan.

== Riot ==
The incident started late Friday June 10 with the riot lasting several days at Xintang. By June 11 more than a thousand people participated. Cars were smashed, ATMs were broken into. Police were attacked.

At around 9pm Sunday June 12 over 1,000 migrant workers began gathering. The demonstrators marched toward Phoenix city where ranks of police formed a human barricade. Armed police used tear gas to disperse the crowd. Thousands of rioters overturned police cars and set fire to local government offices. About 25 people were arrested, and there were no deaths reported.

== See also ==
- 2011 Chaozhou riot
