= 2014 North Korean missile tests =

The 2014 North Korean missile tests were a series of North Korean missile tests in 2014.

== Hwasong-7 overview ==
The Hwasong-7 (sometimes referred as Nodong-1 or Nodong in South Korea) is a single stage, mobile liquid propellant medium range ballistic missile developed by North Korea. Developed in the mid-1980s, it is an adaptation of the Soviet SS-1, more commonly known by its NATO reporting name "Scud".

It is believed North Korea obtained Scud-B designs from Egypt and possibly Scud-C designs from China, and reverse-engineered them into a larger, longer-distance weapon dubbed the Rodong. United States reconnaissance satellites first detected this type in May 1990 at the Musudan-ri test launch facility.

The precise capabilities and specifications of the missile are unknown; even the fact of its production and deployment are controversial. Rodong-1 technology has been exported. Variants are believed to be the basis for Iran's Shahab-3 and Pakistan's Ghauri missiles.

== June 2014 test ==
On June 30, 2014, North Korea tested "launches of tactical ballistic rockets aimed at U.S. and South Korean forces, the second such launch drill reported in state media in three days." South Korea protested because the missiles were launched "without designating a no-sail zone." Kim Min-seok, the South Korean Defense Ministry spokesman, said, "it was difficult to conclude the purpose of Sunday's launches" and Michael B Kelley, another commentator, said "The staged scene, purely for domestic consumption, fits the impoverished country's glorification of war and deification of its Supreme Leaders."

== July 2014 tests ==
On July 2, 2014, South Korea reports that North Korea fired two short range missiles into the Pacific Ocean from the coastal city of Wonsan. On July 9, South Korea claims that North Korea has fired two short range missiles into the ocean to the east of the Korean Peninsula. On July 13, Japan's Defence Ministry claims that North Korea has fired two ballistic missiles into the Sea of Japan. On July 14, South Korea claims that North Korea has fired dozens of artillery shells into the sea near the disputed border.
