= 2013 Beijing Capital International Airport bombing =

Bombing attack in Beijing, China

- Location: 40°04′48″N 116°35′04″E; Terminal 3 of Beijing Capital International Airport in Beijing, China
- Date: 20 July 2013; 6:24 pm (UTC+8)
- Attack type: Bombing
- Weapon: Homemade bomb made of black powder
- Injuries: 1 (the bomber)

A bombing occurred at 6:24 pm on Saturday, 20 July 2013, near the Exit B at the second floor of Terminal 3 in Beijing Capital International Airport in Beijing, China. The blast only injured the bomber Ji Zhongxing (Chinese: 冀中星) himself. No flights were affected, according to airport officials.

== Attack ==
The bomb exploded near the Exit B at the second floor of Terminal 3 in Beijing Capital Airport. Ji was distributing flyers and was then stopped from doing so by the police; after, he detonated the device. Witness exclaimed to have seen a man in wheelchair warning them to step back before the explosion. The man then took the bomb out of a bag with him and set it off, although the police were trying to stop him.

The explosion only injured the bomber himself, who was taken to a hospital soon after, but shocked travelers and sent authorities scrambling. The exit was then closed temporarily. Less than two hours after the explosion, airport officials said operations are back to normal and no flights were affected. At the hospital, doctors amputated his left hand and has since been formally charged.

== Investigation ==
The bomber was later identified as Ji Zhongxing (Chinese: 冀中星) by the police, was born in 1979 and from the city of Heze in Shandong province. Police said Ji is a petitioner, a citizen with a grievance against government officials or police. He exclaimed that he was beaten by the security officers in Dongguan, Guangdong in 2005, breaking his back and paralyzing him from waist down. He began his petition after losing the lawsuits against local government while confined to his home with his father. Officials in Dongguan claimed that he was compensated with 100,000 RMB but this has been contradicted by Ji's personal blog. The Department of Public Security of Guangdong has already required the government of Dongguan to investigate the concerning case.

== Sentencing ==
On 15 October 2013, Ji Zhongxing was sentenced to six years in prison. On 22 March 2018, Ji Zhongxing was released from prison.

== See also ==
- Face Off (Breaking Bad) – the episode in television series Breaking Bad, where Hector Salamanca uses a bomb in his wheelchair to kill Gus Fring.
