= Modern Express Post =

Chinese newspaper

- Type: Daily newspaper
- Founded: October 12, 1999
- Language: Chinese
- Headquarters: Nanjing
- Website: kuaibao.net xdkb.net

The Modern Express Post or Xiandai Kuaibao (Chinese: 现代快报), also known as Modern Express News or Modern Express, is a Nanjing-based Chinese-language metropolitan newspaper published in the China.

== History ==
Modern Express Post was formerly known as Deal Post (买卖报), which was sponsored in April 1993 by Jiangsu Branch of Xinhua News Agency (新华社江苏分社) and was renamed Modern Economic Post (现代经济报) in August 1994.

After receiving approval from the National Press and Publication Administration of China, on October 12, 1999, Modern Economic Post was renamed to its current name and was revised.
