= 2011 Chengdu Foxconn explosion =

Industrial accident in Chengdu, China

The 2011 Chengdu Foxconn explosion occurred on May 13, 2011 in Chengdu, Sichuan province, People's Republic of China.

== Location ==
The Foxconn factory (鸿富锦成都厂) where the incident took place is located at Pi County Hongguang (红光镇) with a total of about 52 production lines. In 2010 chairman Terry Gou referred to this area as the "Chengdu speed"(成都速度), a new development hub that Foxconn would centralise and turn Chengdu into the PRC's number one investment destination within five years.

== Explosion ==
The explosive fire broke out at around 7:30pm and was quickly controlled by 10:00pm. At the time of the incident there were at least a couple hundred workers at the factory. After the explosion, more than 10 fire trucks and a large number of police showed up on the scene. The explosion occurred at the north factory A5 zone iPad 2 assembly line.

A total of 3 people were killed with 15 injured. Singtao reported the explosion cause is related to either a furnace explosion or magnesium power related. The New York Times reported the root cause as a buildup of combustible aluminum dust.

Numerous sources have said the explosion impact affected and cracked the factory building's 2nd, 3rd and 4th floor walls. However, Hon Hai spokesman Edmund Ding (丁祈安) said the explosion was only confined to a single workshop on one floor.

== Effects ==
The factory is an aluminum casing finishing (polishing) plant, and provides services for Apple, Microsoft, and Samsung among others, including work on the iPad line. Reports from the period following the explosions indicated that there would be expected slowdowns in production of the iPad 2 and many other devices. Foxconn denied that there would be any supply chain impact.

The events caused Apple to have worker welfare concerns, and it began corporate and vendor governance changes to improve conditions at Chinese factories.
