= My Heart Sings Loud =

Chinese television series

My Heart Sings Loud (Chinese: 我心唱响), is a variety show produced by Chinese Dragon TV (东方卫视) in China. The show was launched in May 2011, and is hosted by Chao Chi-Tai.

My Heart Sings Loud presents singing and song, but is not a competition or audition; rather, it allows ordinary people to sing and present their thoughts thus.

== Host ==
Chao Chi-Tai (曹启泰) later Lin Hai 林海.
