= 2011 Bohai Bay oil spill =

Oil spill that began in June 2011 in Bohai Bay

Coordinates: 39°5′2.6″N 118°49′5.9″E

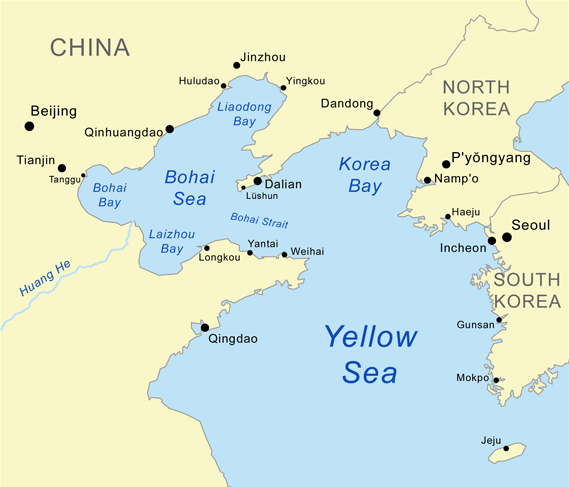

The 2011 Bohai bay oil spill (Chinese: 2011年渤海湾油田溢油事故) was a series of oil spills that began on June 4, 2011 at Bohai Bay. The spill itself however was not publicly disclosed until a month later. There were suspicions of official cover-ups by the State Oceanic Administration (SOA).

== Ownership ==
PL 19-3 is operated by ConocoPhillips China (COPC), a Chinese subsidiary of the Houston-based US oil giant ConocoPhillips. The oil field is 51% owned by China National Offshore Oil Corporation (CNOOC), and 49% owned by the United States company ConocoPhillips.

== Spills ==
=== 1st oil spill ===
On June 4, 2011 the Penglai 19-3 oilfield caused an oil spill from a sea floor leak that lasted until June 7.

=== 2nd oil spill ===
On June 17 a second oil spill that occurred at the Penglai 19-3 oilfield, but was contained within 48 hours. By the second leak, it was reported that a total of 840 square kilometers of first grade clean water in Bohai Bay was polluted.

=== 3rd oil spill ===
A third leak took place on July 12 with the Suizhong 36-1 oil field. This occurred just one day after the Huizhou refinery explosion incident. In total the leaks contaminated a total of 4,250 square kilometers. The media has described the spill to be six times the size of Singapore.

== Leak disclosure ==
The oil spill was not publicly reported until 31 days later on July 5, 2011. It was only revealed because of a public microblog tip-off that appeared on June 21. The news of the oil spill was withheld by the State Oceanic Administration (SOA) for a month. In a statement by the SOA, the US company ConocoPhillips managing the platform was held responsible for the leak, and was fined 200,000 yuan (US$31,000). CNOOC however, said they informed government authorities from the start.

== Environment impact ==
Outside of the spill area, dead seaweed and rotting fish can be seen around Nanhuangcheng island (南隍城島) in Shandong province.

"The oil, containing toxic substances and heavy metals, will greatly affect the growth of marine lives that live on the seabed, such as clams, scallops and some kinds of crabs," Xinhua reported last week quoting Cui Wenlin, director of the environmental monitoring centre with the North China Sea branch of the SOA.

Bohai is a half-closed sea with comparatively low self-clean ability due to limited water exchange with the outside, he added.

The environmental monitoring centre Cui directs has been monitoring the impacts of the oil spills on the Bohai's water quality, seabed sediments and marine lives.

Though the US firm claims that no oil sheen reached the shoreline after the spills, Xinhua reports that "dead seaweed and rotting fish have been reported in the water around Nanhuangcheng Island, about 74 kilometres south from where the leaks originated".

== Responses ==
Further criticism followed that if the spilled oil were to flow into the Yellow Sea, this will damage both North Korea and South Korea. Korean media have complained about Beijing being as irresponsible as the Japanese's reluctant to share information about its nuclear disasters. ConocoPhillips said the spill was the equivalent of 1,500 barrels of oil.

But many Chinese environmental organisations questioned the credibility of the spill volume released by ConocoPhillips.

Zhong Yu, senior action coordinator of Greenpeace, an international environmental organisation, told Xinhua that “the amount is questionable” because, apart from ConocoPhillips and the SOA, ‘no third party attended the assessment’.

In addition, 11 environmental organisations sent an open letter to ConocoPhillips China and CNOOC Ltd on Thursday, asking the two companies to assist the organisations and other people concerned to visit the scene of the leak to investigate the incident and its aftermath.

== Track records ==
The CNOOC has recently come under scrutiny for several accidents involving its facilities, the third such incident on the Bohai Sea in less than two months. Following an oil spill on Tuesday in its Suizhong 36-1 oilfield, it was to be shut temporarily, SOA announced in a statement. By Wednesday afternoon, CNOOC finished cleaning up an oil slick near the oilfield and gradually resumed production.
