= List of 2014 box office number-one films in China =

This is a list of 2014 box office number-one films in China (only Mainland China).

== Number-one films ==
†	This implies the highest-grossing movie of the year.

Week	Date	Film	Gross in USD	Notes
1	January 5, 2014	Police Story 2013	$27.34 million	
2	January 12, 2014	Despicable Me 2	$15.53 million	
3	January 19, 2014	Despicable Me 2	$18.60 million	
4	January 26, 2014	Boonie Bears: To the Rescue	$13.35 million	
5	February 2, 2014	The Monkey King	$52.12 million	
6	February 9, 2014	The Monkey King	$74.94 million	
7	February 16, 2014	Beijing Love Story	$33.54 million	
8	February 23, 2014	The Hobbit: The Desolation of Smaug	$33.40 million	
9	March 2, 2014	The Hobbit: The Desolation of Smaug	$26.77 million	
10	March 9, 2014	RoboCop	$21.63 million	
11	March 16, 2014	Need for Speed	$21.31 million	
12	March 23, 2014	Need for Speed	$24.38 million	
13	March 30, 2014	Need for Speed	$13.95 million	
14	April 6, 2014	Captain America: The Winter Soldier	$38.81 million	
15	April 13, 2014	Captain America: The Winter Soldier	$41.85 million	
16	April 20, 2014	Captain America: The Winter Soldier	$18.20 million	
17	April 27, 2014	My Old Classmate	$17.72 million	
18	May 4, 2014	My Old Classmate	$34.91 million	
19	May 11, 2014	The Amazing Spider-Man 2	$46.71 million	
20	May 18, 2014	The Amazing Spider-Man 2	$24.68 million	
21	May 25, 2014	X-Men: Days of Future Past	$39.68 million	
22	June 1, 2014	X-Men: Days of Future Past	$44.43 million	
23	June 8, 2014	Edge of Tomorrow	$25.90 million	
24	June 15, 2014	Godzilla	$37.40 million	
25	June 22, 2014	Godzilla	$31.99 million	
26	June 29, 2014	Transformers: Age of Extinction †	$101.86 million	
27	July 6, 2014	Transformers: Age of Extinction †	$121.26 million	
28	July 13, 2014	Transformers: Age of Extinction †	$56.81 million	
29	July 20, 2014	Tiny Times 3	$50.92 million	
30	July 27, 2014	The Continent	$47.63 million	
31	August 3, 2014	The White Haired Witch of Lunar Kingdom	$35.98 million	
32	August 10, 2014	The White Haired Witch of Lunar Kingdom	$19.90 million	
33	August 17, 2014	How to Train Your Dragon 2	$26.77 million	
34	August 24, 2014	How to Train Your Dragon 2	$24.52 million	
35	August 31, 2014	Dawn of the Planet of the Apes	$47.33 million	
36	September 7, 2014	The Expendables 3	$41.24 million	
37	September 14, 2014	Dawn of the Planet of the Apes	$20.28 million	
38	September 21, 2014	Dawn of the Planet of the Apes	$8.56 million	
39	September 28, 2014	Dearest	$16.27 million	
40	October 5, 2014	Breakup Buddies	$98.00 million	
41	October 12, 2014	Breakup Buddies	$49.21 million	
42	October 19, 2014	Guardians of the Galaxy	$39.35 million	
43	October 26, 2014	Lucy	$20.87 million	
44	November 2, 2014	Teenage Mutant Ninja Turtles	$26.94 million	
45	November 9, 2014	Teenage Mutant Ninja Turtles	$25.53 million	
46	November 16, 2014	Interstellar	$43.14 million	
47	November 23, 2014	Interstellar	$42.44 million	
48	November 30, 2014	Interstellar	$23.60 million	
49	December 7, 2014	Fleet of Time	$33.60 million	
50	December 14, 2014	Fleet of Time	$36.05 million	
51	December 21, 2014	Gone with the Bullets	$55.27 million	
52	December 28, 2014	The Taking of Tiger Mountain	$51.29 million	

== See also ==
- List of Chinese films of 2014
