= Death of Lei Yang =

Chinese environmentalist who died following an altercation with police

Lei Yang (Chinese: 雷洋) was a Chinese environmentalist who died following an altercation with police in Changping District, Beijing. Lei was detained on suspicion of soliciting prostitution at a foot parlor. Lei was killed due to police brutality confirmed by an independent autopsy. However, the police stated that after being taken to a police vehicle, Lei fell ill and was sent to a hospital, where he died later that night. The unclear circumstances surrounding his death led to accusations of police brutality, leading law enforcement officials to provide a description of events on state television. An online petition launched by students of Renmin University, Lei's alma mater, questioned various elements of the police's account, and called for an investigation into his death.

== Background ==
=== Lei Yang ===
Lei Yang was a native of Hunan Province in central China. In 2009, he graduated from Renmin University with a degree in environmental science. His wife had recently given birth to a child, and Lei celebrated his three-year anniversary three weeks prior to his death. At the time of his death, he was 29, and worked for the China Association of Circular Economy, an environmental organization with ties to the government.

=== Police investigation into foot massage parlor ===
At 8:00 PM on May 7, Changping police received reports claiming that a foot massage parlor was running a prostitution business. "Foot massage parlor", according to The New York Times, is a popular Chinese euphemism for brothels. Initiating a probe into the parlor, the police arrived at 8:40. On their Sina Weibo microblog, the police said they had arrested six individuals (including Lei).

=== Timeline of encounter with police and death ===
Between 8:30 and 9:00 PM on May 7, 2016, Lei left home to pick up his relatives from the airport; at 9:00 PM, he told his father-in-law he would take the subway to the airport. A statement by Changping police said officers saw Lei leaving the massage parlor at 9:14 PM, and detained him on suspicion of soliciting prostitution. Police described Lei as violently uncooperative, biting an officer and attempting to run away, destroying a handheld police camera. Lei was restrained and put in a police vehicle, where he escaped by moving towards the front seat and opening the car door. At 9:45, Lei was caught and handcuffed. Lei began to complain of illness, and was taken to a nearby hospital at 10:05 PM. Early reports described Lei as dead on arrival, though he was officially declared dead at 10:55 PM, according to later police accounts. Once the plane arrived at 11:30, Lei's wife attempted to contact him multiple times via mobile phone. At 1:00 AM, a police officer answered, urging her to come to the police station. Lei's family was allowed to see the body at 4:30 AM, but were prevented from taking photographs of the body, which they say was covered in multiple bruises and injuries.

=== Aftermath, police reactions and trial ===
On May 13, the police officer leading the operation on the parlor appeared on Chinese Central Television, stating the operation was conducted "according to the relevant laws and regulations". Police denied accusations of police brutality, and stated they had found a condom on the scene which contained Lei's DNA. A worker at the parlor said she had performed a sex act on Lei in exchange for 200 yuan ($31 USD). An autopsy was conducted from May 13 to 14, overseen by a forensic medical expert at the family's request. Medical experts, lawyers and prosecutors observed the trial, though police officers were excluded to avoid perceptions of a conflict of interest. On May 14, Beijing authorities promised they would release the results of the autopsy as well as surveillance footage. According to Chinese prosecutors, Lei's family had appointed an unnamed third party to conduct the investigation. Five lawyers were appointed to represent Lei in an upcoming trial. Xinhua reported that prosecutors had stated they were conducting interviews of Lei's family, witnesses, and police officers involved in Lei's case. Beijing police announced a zero-tolerance policy if misconduct was found to be a factor in Lei's death. A statement circulating online, reportedly from Wu Wencui, Lei's wife, announced she was suing the police department for "intentional injury resulting in death".

On June 1, the prosecution department of Changping announced they would investigate the role five police officers in the death of Lei Yang.

On June 30, an independent autopsy found that Lei Yang apparently choked to death by the Beijing People's Procuratorate's statement.

On December 23, the People's Procuratorate of Fengtai District of Beijing determined that the five police officers did not perform their duties properly, behaved inappropriately during the incident, deliberately fabricated facts, and obstructed the investigation. However, it also determined that the crime was "minor" and decided not to prosecute the officers involved.

== Public response ==
Reports of Lei's death were widely discussed and shared on the Internet. Professor Zhang Jiang of the Beijing Foreign Studies University said the reports highlighted discontent regarding abuses of power by police, leveraging fears about personal security of the middle-class. Four petitions, claimed to be from various groups of alumni at Lei's alma mater, Renmin University. Some links to these petitions were deleted by Chinese censors. Beijing News reported it had confirmed the authenticity of one such petition, written by 1988 graduates of Renmin. The petition, named "We Must Speak Out — Statement by Some 1988 Alumni of Renmin University of China on Fellow Student Lei Yang's Death", appeared on a Baidu website on May 12, but was deleted as the day progressed. Li Jianjun, a former investigative journalist, questioned the police's account, stating that Lei did not fit the profile of those caught in raids on brothels, and would not have had time to visit prostitutes.
