= Yinzibing =

Unverified disease reported in China

Yinzibing (阴滋病) is an unverified disease. AIDS-like symptoms were reported by people who claimed that they had caught an infectious disease, but they tested negative for HIV.

== Etymology ==
The term was coined from "yīnxìng (negative)", "àizī (AIDS)", and "bìng (disease)". It was also referred to as "Yinxing Aizibing" (阴性艾滋病, HIV-negative AIDS).

== History ==
In 2011, rumors of an AIDS-like disease were spreading in Mainland China, which captured the attention of the media of China and Hong Kong and spread across the internet. The Disease Prevention and Control Bureau of China stated that no new virus was found and that yinzibing was a mental health problem.

In 2013 an epidemiological study conducted by the Army Medical University in China found the following symptoms in patients claiming to have yinzibing: crepitus (crunching noise from the joints when moved), thick white tongue coating, muscle twitches (fasciculation), dry skin, burping, chronic sore throat and several others. The study found that 33% of yinzibing patients have low CD4 cells (less than 500 CD4 cells per mm3). The study concluded that this disease could not be completely explained by a mental disorder.

A 2019 study suggested the symptoms were explainable as chronic fatigue syndrome, an illness usually precipitated by a viral infection.
