= 2011 Chaozhou riot =

Riot in China

- Date: Duanwu Festival June 6, 2011 in
- Location: Huayi Ceramics Factory, Guxiang, Chao'an County, Chaozhou, Guangdong, China
- Caused by: Wage dispute, inter-ethnic conflict

Number
Thousands	

Casualties and losses
18 people injured	

The 2011 Chaozhou riot (Chinese: 潮州6·6事件) began on the night of Duanwu Festival June 6, 2011 in Guxiang (古巷镇) Chao'an County, Chaozhou, Guangdong, People's Republic of China.

== Background ==
On June 1 a wage dispute took place at the Huayi Ceramics Factory (华意陶瓷厂) in Chao'an. A Sichuan migrant worker couple and their son surnamed Xiong (熊), from Zhongjiang County Sichuan, went to the factory demanding unpaid wages of about 2,000 yuan.

The father argued with the boss of the factory and was hurt in the forehead. His 19-year-old son Xiong suffered cuts to the feet and hands after being attacked by two employees of the factory.

The boss of the factory surnamed Su (苏), surrendered Saturday and confessed to the crime. He owed 61 workers 800,000 yuan in unpaid wages. The other two suspects who carried out the attack were also arrested by the police.

== Riot ==
By June 2 more and more Sichuanese people from nearby areas began gathering for a movement. A few people in the beginning increased to thousands of people.

By June 6 a protest was held at Guxiang involving 200 migrant workers at around 10pm. This turned into a riot with 18 people injured, 9 detained. One vehicle was set on fire, 3 cars were destroyed and 15 cars were damaged during the clash.

The tension between Chaozhou (Teochew people) and Sichuan people have escalated to the point where the situation has been described as "Battle of Chaozhou". Different community groups have come out to protect themselves. There are fears of Sichuan citizens bombing their gas stations in Chaozhou. And fears of Chaozhou people in Sichuan getting attacked.

== See also ==
- 2011 Zengcheng riot
- Regional discrimination in China
- Punti–Hakka Clan Wars
