= Mutiny on Lurongyu 2682 =

2011 mutiny and mass murder on Chinese trawler

- Location: South Pacific
- Date: 20 July 2011 – 25 July 2011
- Attack type: Murders
- Weapons: Knives, fishhook, stick
- Deaths: 22
- Injuries: 1 (captain)
- Perpetrator: Other 11 on board

The mutiny and mass murder on Lurongyu 2682 (Chinese: 鲁荣渔2682号), a Chinese squid-jigging trawler, took place in the South Pacific Ocean between June and July 2011. A group of crewmen from the ship, led by Liu Guiduo (刘贵夺), seized control of the ship from their captain Li Chengquan (李承权). Of the 33 men on board, 16 were killed and 6 jumped overboard (and are presumed dead). The captain cooperated with the hijackers in the later stage of the mutiny when they convinced him to sail and illegally emigrate to Japan.

Eleven crew members returned to China. In 2013, these crew members were convicted of murder, with five receiving death sentences, including the captain. An interview with Duan Zhifang (段志芳) (the first of the convicted crew to be released) went viral, and the events have been adapted into a radio drama and a visual novel.

== Background ==
=== Ship and crew ===
Lurongyu 2682 is the generic name of the fishing vessel, registered in Rongcheng, Shandong. It was owned by Shandong Rongcheng Xinfa Seafood Corporation (山东荣成市鑫发水产公司).

There were originally 35 crewmen on board, but two of them left before departure due to low salary and health problems. One of them was Wang Shubin (王树彬) and the other was surnamed Yan (严), given name unknown. After that, there were 33 crewmen on board, split across three social groups. These groups were from the province of Heilongjiang, the region of Inner Mongolia, and the management team from the city of Dalian. Only some of the crew were licensed seafarers. They boarded the ship and passed the customs check normally, while unlicensed seafarers boarded another small boat to avoid the custom check, and transferred to Lurongyu 2682 at sea.

The working contract between the sailors and the operating company stated that the ship would return to China after two years. However, the stamp that the company used in the contract was forged, making all of the sailors undocumented employees.

=== Initial voyage and discontent ===
On 27 December 2010, the Lurongyu 2682 departed from Port Shidao (石岛), located in Rongcheng City, Shandong Province, China, for squid jigging. The ship arrived off the coast of Peru in February 2011 and began jigging operations. The crew complained about the working environment and by May 2011 they became discontent and suspicious about the company. They assumed that the company would violate the contract by deducting their salaries. Liu Guiduo expressed his concern to Captain Li Chengquan and requested that they immediately return to China. Li refused to do so.

== Mutiny ==
On 16 June 2011, while the ship was in the Chilean Sea, Liu led a group of 11 crewmen to hijack the ship. They forced their way into the captain's cabin and beat Li with a stick. Chief Cook Xia Qiyong (夏琦勇) heard the disturbance and rushed to Li's cabin with a kitchen knife, and was killed by the mutineers. The crew did not believe that there would be another killing and decided to claim that Xia had fallen into the sea by himself.

The mutineers forced Li to sail back to China, keeping him under watch. Concerned about further interference and acts of revenge for Xia's killing, they disabled the ship's communications and locked all knives, lifeboats and life jackets. Several weeks passed quietly: the ship rounded Hawaii and was a couple weeks from China. Liu was then informed that the ship was consuming fuel at an abnormally high rate and that the auxiliary engines had failed. Crewman Bo Fujun (薄福军) told Liu that Chief Engineer Wen Dou (温斗) and others who were personally close to Li were planning a revolt, and asked Liu to spare them.

On 20 July 2011, Liu ordered the mutineers to kill all the crewmen who he believed were trying to revolt. Under the cover of loud music, they killed nine men, stabbing them on the ship's deck and throwing their bodies into the sea. The victims included Bo, as Liu was uncertain of his loyalty. Liu personally killed the second mate, and made certain that each of the mutineers had taken part in a murder.

Liu decided not to return to China. He told the mutineers that they would instead illegally immigrate to Japan. To facilitate this, Liu forced some of the crew to call their families by satellite phone to transfer money. He said that the other crew members could return to China, and that he did not care if they testified against him. Nonetheless, there was great unease and suspicion following the mass killing. The following day, crewman Ma Yuchao (马玉超) was missing, and was believed to have jumped into the sea due to the atmosphere of terror.

Baodegejirihu (包德格吉日胡), the leader of a close group of six mutineers who were from Inner Mongolia, felt that the killings would continue and that only those closest to Liu would be spared. He planned to revolt against Liu, but Liu learned of this. Liu convinced Li to join the mutineers and to avenge his murdered friends by killing Baodegejirihu. On 24 July 2011, while the ship was 1,600 km (990 mi) from Japan, Liu tricked Baodegejirihu to come to the deck where Baodegejirihu was killed by Li and Cui Yong (崔勇), another crew member who had joined the mutineers. Baodegejirihu shouted for help but none of his allies responded. That night, Baodegejirihu's five men were systematically murdered.

Following this, there were eleven crew alive on the ship, each of whom had killed. Liu told them to blame the killings on Baodegejirihu and his men, and to say that the killers escaped with a lifeboat. To ensure their cooperation, Liu threatened harm to their families, whose addresses he had obtained from the ship's records.

In August, a Japan Coast Guard boat assisted Lurongyu 2682 with problems becoming underway. Suspicious about the small crew on Lurongyu, the Japan Coast Guard contacted the China Coast Guard. A rescue team from the China Coast Guard, which had received the distress signal, arrived after a few days and towed the ship back to China.

== Perpetrators ==
- Liu Guiduo (刘贵夺), age 26
- Jiang Xiaolong (姜晓龙), age 35
- Liu Chengjian (刘成建), age 24
- Huang Jinbo (黄金波), age 20
- Li Chengquan (李承权), age 42
- Duan Zhifang (段志芳), age 25
- Xiang Lishan (项立山), age between 50 and 60
- Wang Peng (王鹏)
- Feng Xingyan (冯兴艳)
- Cui Yong (崔勇)
- Mei Linsheng (梅林盛)

== Victims ==
=== Murdered ===
- Baodegejirihu (包德格吉日胡), age 27
- Dai Fushun (戴福顺), age 21
- Xia Qiyong (夏琦勇), age 40
- Wen Dou (温斗), age 34
- Wen Mi (温密), age 36
- Yue Peng (岳朋), age 45
- Liu Gang (刘刚), age 32
- Wang Yongbo (王永波), age 48
- Jiang Shutao (姜树涛), age 27
- Chen Guojun (陈国军), age 45
- Bo Fujun (薄福军), age 33
- Wu Guozhi (吴国志), age 42
- Shan Guoxi (单国喜), age 42
- Qiu Ronghua (邱荣华), age 40
- Bao Baocheng (包宝成), age 36
- Song Guochun (宋国春), age 44

=== Missing ===
- Shuang Xi (双喜), age 28
- Ding Yumin (丁玉民), age 42
- Fu Yizhong (付义忠), age 42
- Wang Yanlong (王延龙), age 48
- Ma Yuchao (马玉超), age 25
- Gong Xuejun (宫学军), age 41

== Legal proceedings ==
All eleven surviving crewmembers were detained by police when they returned to Shidao on 12 August 2011. They initially followed Liu Guiduo's instructions, denied any killing, and blamed the deaths on Baodegejirihu and his friends. Later, all except Liu Guiduo confessed.

On 19 March 2013, a court in Weihai City, Shandong Province, announced the sentence of the eleven convicted, as follows:

- Liu Guiduo, Jiang Xiaolong, Liu Chengjian, and Huang Jinbo were found guilty of murder and ship hijacking and sentenced to death.
- Li Chengquan was found guilty of murder and sentenced to death;
- Wang Peng was found guilty of murder and of ship hijacking, and sentenced to death with reprieve.
- Feng Xingyan was found guilty of murder and sentenced to life in prison;
- Mei Linsheng and Cui Yong were found guilty of murder and sentenced to 15 years in prison;
- Xiang Lishan was found guilty of murder and theft, with a combined sentence was 5 years in prison and a 10,000 RMB penalty.
- Duan Zhifang was found guilty of murder and sentenced to 4 years in prison.

On 23 March 2017, the Supreme Court of China authorized the death penalty of Liu Guiduo, Jiang Xiaolong, Liu Chengjian, Huang Jinbo, and Li Chengquan.

== Reaction ==
Families of most deceased crew members received compensation from Xinfa. The government promised to strengthen regulations and enforcement regarding fishing safety, training, and labour disputes.

One anonymous crewmate (believed to be Duan Zhifang), once released, was interviewed by a reporter named Du Qiang. His account of the mutiny was published as a 17,000 character story in January 2016, and was later translated into English by Nicky Harman and Emily Jones. It became an Internet hit that attracted 30 million views and 100,000 comments on Sina Weibo. A monograph, based on a separate interview with the released crewman, was written by a legal journalist and published in August 2016.

On 25 October 2018, the events were loosely adapted into a visual novel titled One-Way Ticket and released on Steam by the Chinese indie game company Zodiac Interactive. For marketing purposes, the setting and characters were made to be Japanese.

Two attempts have been made to adapt the case into a movie: the first time in October 2016, but the filming was terminated due to failure to obtain filming approval from National Radio and Television Administration (NRTA); the second time in May 2017, and obtained approval from NRTA approved the online movie launch and was scheduled to be broadcast exclusively on Tencent Video on May 27, 2023, but it was still taken offline at the last moment.

== Bibliography ==
Monograph

- Guo, Guosong (2016). 太平洋大劫杀 [The Great Hijack and Murder in the Pacific]. The People's Publishing House Oriental Publishing. (The author is a legal journalist, the former senior reporter of Southern Weekly and former executive chief editor of Legal Weekly.)
