= Luo Meizhen =

Chinese longevity claimant (1885? - 2013)

- 羅美珍
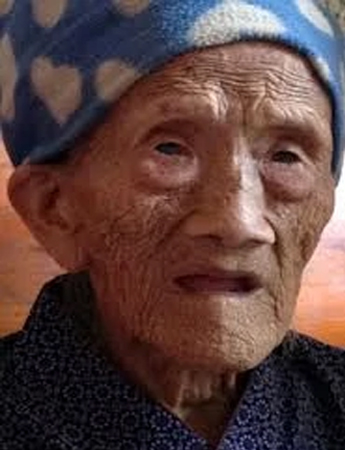
- Born: 9 July 1885 (claimed); Enlong County, Hechi Prefecture, Guangxi, Qing China
- Died: 4 June 2013 (claimed age 127); Bama Yao Autonomous County, Guangxi, People's Republic of China
- Occupation: farmer
- Known for: longevity claimant

Luo Meizhen (simplified Chinese: 罗美珍; traditional Chinese: 羅美珍; pinyin: Luó Měizhēn, 9 July 1885? – 4 June 2013) was a Chinese claimant for the world's oldest person. Her claim was supported by a report from the Gerontological Society of China (GSC). However, it has not gained widespread acceptance due to the lack of reliable birth records in Guangxi at the time of her birth.

== Life and family ==
Luo Meizhen's official identity documents claimed that she was born in Guangxi on 9 July 1885. However, these documents were issued later in life. Her birth date could not be authoritatively verified as birth records were not kept in the region until 1949.

She was from the Yao ethnic group and lived in Bama county. Bama is known for the longevity of many of its residents, recording 31.7 centenarians per 100,000 people at their 2011 census. Luo was illiterate and worked as a farmer and housewife throughout her life. She was described as a nice but stubborn woman with a strong character.

Luo had five children. Skeptics of her longevity claim pointed out that if her date of birth was as claimed, she would have given birth to her youngest son aged 61.

== Oldest person claim ==
In 2010, the Gerontological Society of China announced that 127-year-old Luo Meizhen was the oldest living person in China. This also made her a likely claimant to be the oldest living person in the world. However, the lack of official birth records meant that Guinness World Records did not accept the claim of longevity.

== Death ==
After a few months of illness, Luo died of natural causes at the claimed age of 127 on 4 June 2013. She had several great-great-grandchildren by the time of her death.
