= 2011 Zhongshan riot =

Land dispute in Zhongshan, China

Coordinates: 22°40′23″N 113°13′46″E

The 2011 Zhongshan riot occurred on November 12, 2011, in Zhongshan, Guangdong, People's Republic of China. The riot was over issues related to land.

== Background ==
The case began in August 2011 when villagers tried to block production at the Jinrui Industrial park by extending a land leasing row. Claims were made that the protest came after Dongsheng government officials sold off village land for their own personal gain. The villagers said the officials were not willing to give compensate 1.5 million yuan per mu of land. The negotiations could not come to a conclusion, and police were sent to beat up the villagers instead.

== Riot ==
According to the Hong Kong Oriental Daily news, thousands of residents were involved in the riot on November 12, 2011. Residents of Yilong village attacked the Jinrui Industrial park in Xiaolan town. They wielded clubs and threw stones. They burned two factory shops to vent their anger, and 3000 armed police were on the scene.

A report said three people had been beaten to death, but the police denied anyone had died on their Sina Weibo microblog account. Photographs uploaded to the microblog, and other websites showed columns of police trooping through the village. Crowds of residents engaged in stand-offs with the police and a nighttime sit-down protest.

== See also ==
- 2011 Zhili riot
