= Changzhou Foreign Languages School controversy =

Environmental controversy in China

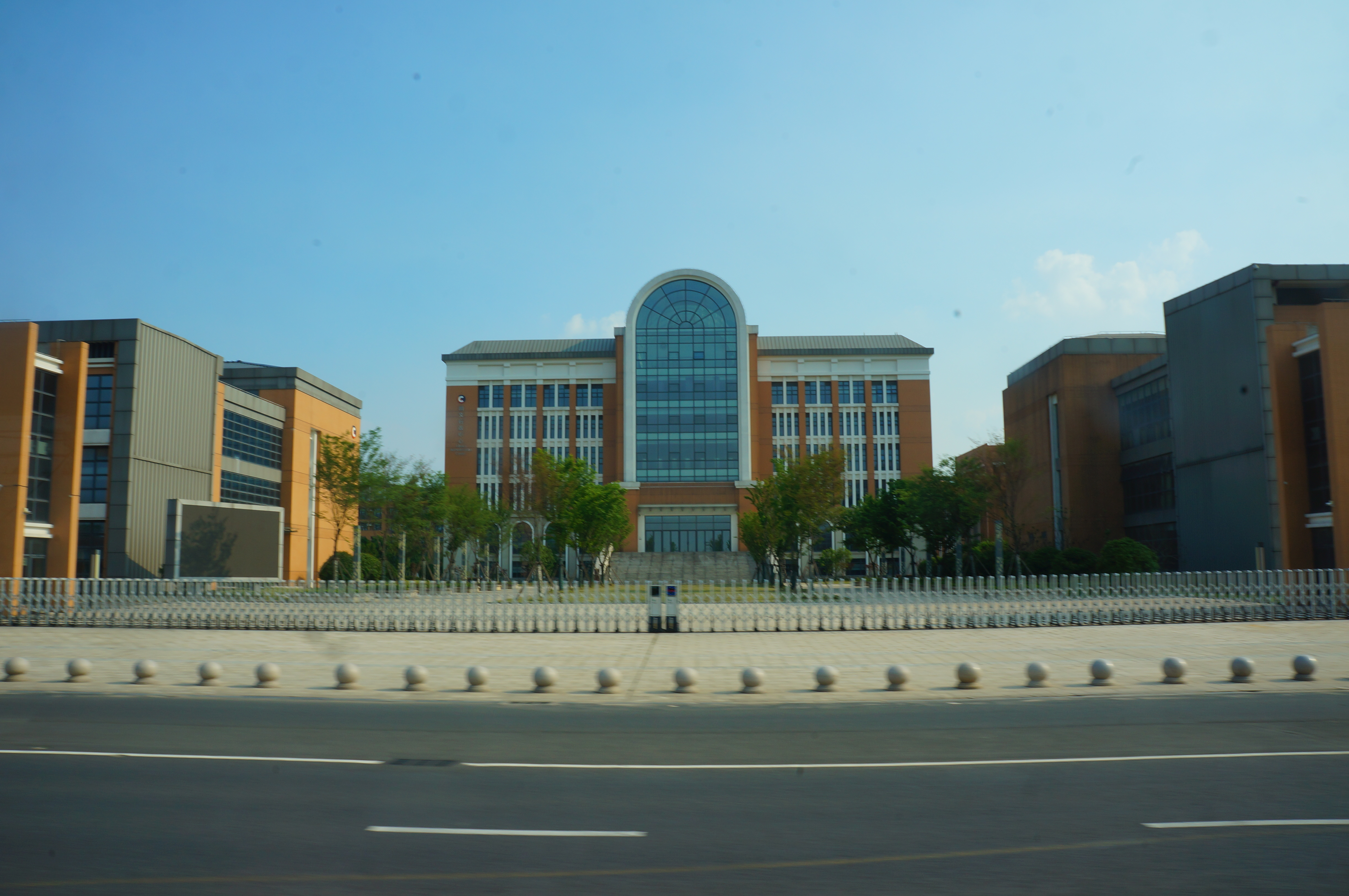
The new campus of Changzhou Foreign Languages School, completed in 2015

The Changzhou Foreign Languages School controversy concerns environmental issues at the relocated campus of Changzhou Foreign Languages High School (CZFLS; Chinese: 常州外国语学校; pinyin: Chángzhōu wàiguóyǔ xuéxiào), a school in Changzhou, Jiangsu Province. The new campus neighbors former premises of chemical factories, and students complained of rashes, nosebleeds, and a pervasive smell throughout the building upon its opening.

In 2016, state broadcaster Chinese Central Television (CCTV) broadcast reports claiming pollution was negatively affecting students' health. According to the broadcast, of 641 pupils who underwent medical examinations, 493 were diagnosed with ailments such as bronchitis, blood and thyroid abnormalities, and in extreme cases, lymphoma and leukemia. Levels of chlorobenzene in groundwater were reportedly over 94,000 times the national safety standard. Following the reports, news of the illnesses spread across Chinese social media; on Weibo, a Chinese microblogging website, the topic was viewed over 30 million times.

== Background ==
Changzhou Foreign Languages School was relocated to a new 153-acre site in September 2015. Before the school was relocated, three chemical factories occupied area near the modern CZFLS campus: Changyu, Huada, and Changlong, a subsidiary of the large Chinese pesticide manufacturer Shenzhen Noposion Agrochemicals Company. Reports by Caixin, a Chinese magazine, quoted former Jiangsu Changlong employees who claimed the company had buried toxic waste at the site of the factory prior to its relocation in 2010. An environmental assessment, completed seven months after the school began construction, found no problem with the school's relocation, although it deemed groundwater unsafe for consumption. A separate survey in 2012 found dangerous levels of toxic substances; chlorobenzene levels were 78,899 times safe levels in soil and 94,799 times those in groundwater. In December 2015, students began to complain of rashes and nosebleeds. At the time, soil was being excavated for treatment, which left a heavy stench in the area. These reports prompted CZFLS to end its autumn semester earlier than usual in January. The soil was then buried beneath a layer of clay to relieve concerns regarding pollution. The school released a statement in mid-February, citing a report by Caixin which deemed the clay cover safe.

== Media reports and response ==
On April 17, 2016, CCTV reported several students attending CZFLS suffered health abnormalities. The report claimed 641 pupils underwent medical examinations, 493 of which were found ill. Students were described as afflicted with several health issues, such as headaches, rashes, bronchitis, blood and thyroid abnormalities, and in extreme cases, tumors, leukemia, and lymphoma. The report asserted that waste had been disposed 100 meters from the school by chemical factories, and reported the 2012 survey noting levels of chlorobenzene in the soil were 94,799 times the national safety standard. The hashtag #pollutedschool received 26 million views in the day following the reports, and the topic was viewed over 30 million times on the Chinese microblogging website Weibo. Pictures showing students with red, blotchy skin circulated throughout social media.

The Changzhou city government, while agreeing that students had been affected after the move, believed the problem was less severe. They assert that from January 11 to February 29, 133 out of 597 students admitted to hospitals showed health abnormalities, and most students were afflicted with coughs, nosebleeds, vomiting, and thyroid gland lumps; they found no instances of leukemia, and a single case of lymph cancer that originated before the school's opening. They claimed the afflictions were within expected ranges, pointing to viral infection, drug intake, and immunodeficiency.

The Chinese central government promised an investigation on health issues in Changzhou Foreign Language School; the Ministry of Environmental Protection stated it "attached great importance to the matter". Responding to the report, city government stated they had "zero tolerance" for pollution and would act upon the information. The Ministry of Education sent an inspection team to Changzhou, with the stated objective of protecting students' health. School officials disputed the CCTV report, claiming that reports of mass illness were exaggerated. In an open letter, they noted "Even our foreign teachers, who have always been sensitive to environmental problems, are having a hard time understanding why the media are playing up this issue as such a serious problem".

Ada Kong, toxics campaign manager for Greenpeace, an environmental organization, said the students' illness "shows just how dangerously lax China's hazardous chemical management is." Ma Jun said corporations responsible for pollution would have to face public scrutiny, and urged the industry "to really recognize the fundamental change that is happening [in public opinion]". He compared the incident to the Love Canal disaster of 1978, in which families of a residential New York neighborhood were contaminated by toxic waste, resulting in severe health issues.
