= Dalian PX protest =

2011 protest in Dalian, China

Coordinates: 38°54′40″N 121°36′57″E

The Dalian PX protest (locally called the 8–14 event; Chinese: 大连8·14抗议; pinyin: Dàlián 8·14 kàngyì) was a peaceful public protest in People's Square, Dalian, to protest against a paraxylene (PX) chemical factory—Dalian Fujia Dahua Petrochemical (大連福佳大化石油化工)—built in Dalian city. The protest took place on 14 August 2011.

== Background ==
On 8 August, typhoon Muifa struck Dalian city, breaching one of the factory's protective dykes. The breach highlighted the risk of a future storm or natural event causing a breach in the factory's storage tanks, flooding the town with the highly toxic chemical. The factory, a joint venture between the city and the private company Fujia began operating in 2007.

In early August, prior to the typhoon, a film crew from China Central Television (CCTV), filming a story on the factory, were denied entry to the factory and then beaten by factory workers. A trailer advertising the story was broadcast on CCTV, but the segment was withdrawn by the station, triggering speculation on blogs and Twitter that the factory was being protected from scrutiny by someone in authority.

== 14 August 2011 ==
Residents of Dalian organised a "stroll" (used as a euphemism for "protest" in China to avoid censorship) in People's Square through Weibo, Twitter, blogs and Internet forums to spread the message. On 14 August, tens of thousands of people gathered in the Square to protest, demanding the factory be immediately shut down and relocated, and that investigation into the factory be made public.

The news agency Reuters reported that Chinese authorities had blocked searches for the terms "PX", "Dalian" and "Dalian protests" on Weibo microblogs.

== Compromise ==
On the afternoon of 14 August, the Dalian city government agreed to move the factory out of city, although the new location of the factory and the date of its move were not announced. The proposed new location was later announced to be an industrial park on Xizhong Island.

In early December 2011, a leaked document posted online suggested that the plant had passed safety checks and would soon resume production. Shortly afterwards, local residents reported that smoke was billowing from the plant's chimney and workers were arriving at the plant. City officials refused to confirm that the plant was active, and said that the planned move to Xizhong Island would proceed but would take some time.
