= 2012 in Hong Kong =

- Decades: 1990s; 2000s; 2010s; 2020s
- See also: Other events of 2012; History of Hong Kong • Timeline • Years

Events in the year 2012 in Hong Kong.

== Incumbents ==
- Chief Executive: Donald Tsang (until 30 June); Leung Chun-ying (from 1 July)

== Events ==
- 29 February - Civic Passion was founded.
- April - Bonham Strand brand of bespoke tailored suits is founded.

== See also ==
- List of Hong Kong films of 2012
