= 1952 in Hong Kong =

- 1952 in British Hong Kong
- 1950 • 1951 • 1952 • 1953 • 1954
- Decades: 1940s (Hong Kong) • 1950s • 1960s
- See also: History of Hong Kong • Timeline of Hong Kong history • List of years in Hong Kong

The following lists events during 1952 in British Hong Kong.

== Incumbents ==
- Monarch of the United Kingdom - George VI (until 6 February), Elizabeth II (from 6 February)
- Governor - Sir Alexander Grantham

== Births ==
- January 2 – Ng Man-tat, actor (died 2021)
- February 7 – Tony Liu, actor
