= 1998 in Hong Kong =

- Decades: 1970s; 1980s; 1990s; 2000s; 2010s
- See also: Other events of 1998; History of Hong Kong • Timeline • Years

Events in the year 1998 in Hong Kong.

== Incumbents ==
- Chief Executive: Tung Chee-hwa

== Events ==
- 25 January - Miss Chinese International Pageant 1998
- 2 February - All ferry routes from Jordan Road Ferry Pier were open.
- 26 April - 17th Hong Kong Film Awards
- 24 May - The 1998 Hong Kong legislative election were held for electing the 1st Legislative Council of Hong Kong
- 6 July - The Kai Tak Airport, which was the international airport of Hong Kong since 1954 was closed

.

== See also ==
- List of Hong Kong films of 1982
