= 2013 in Hong Kong =

- Decades: 1990s; 2000s; 2010s; 2020s
- See also: Other events of 2013; History of Hong Kong • Timeline • Years

Events in the year 2013 in Hong Kong.

== Incumbents ==
- Chief Executive - Leung Chun-ying

== Events ==
=== March ===
- 25 March - Hong Kong's Court of Final Appeal rules that foreign domestic workers are not allowed to become Hong Kong permanent residents.

=== April ===
- 3 April - In cricket, United Arab Emirates defeats Hong Kong by 32 runs for the third place.

=== May ===
- 3 May - The world's largest rubber duck is moved to Hong Kong.

=== June ===
- 23 June - After a failed U.S. extradition request Hong Kong says does not fully comply with the law, U.S. whistleblower Edward Snowden leaves Hong Kong for Moscow.

=== September ===
- 23 September - At least 25 people are dead in Hong Kong and southern China after Typhoon Usagi passes through with the storm having killed eight people in the Philippines.

== See also ==
- List of Hong Kong films of 2013
