= 2016 in Hong Kong =

- Decades: 1990s; 2000s; 2010s; 2020s
- See also: Other events of 2016; History of Hong Kong • Timeline • Years

The following lists events during 2016 in Hong Kong.

== Incumbents ==
- Chief Executive - Leung Chun-ying

== Events ==
=== January ===
- The suspected local abduction of a Hong Kong citizen by mainland Chinese law enforcement brought to light a series of disappearances relating to a book selling and publishing business in Hong Kong, triggering an international political scandal for the CY Leung administration and for the Chinese Communist Party.

=== February ===
- Civil unrest in Mong Kok occurred on the night of 8 February 2016, lasting until the next morning. The incident escalated from the government's crackdown on unlicensed street hawkers during the Chinese New Year holidays, and resulted in the worst outbreak of street violence since the 1960s.
- The New Territories East by-election was held to elect a replacement for legislative councillor Ronny Tong Ka-wah of New Territories East constituency who quit the Civic Party and resigned from the Legislative Council of Hong Kong (LegCo), effective on 1 October 2015. Alvin Yeung of the Civic Party was duly elected.

=== April ===
- 1 April - Asia Television shuts down.

=== September ===
- 4 September - 2016 Hong Kong legislative election

=== November ===
- 15 November - Baggio Leung and Yau Wai-ching were disqualified from LegCo membership.

=== December ===
- 9 December - Leung Chun-ying declared to not run for Chief Executive in 2017.

== Deaths ==
=== March ===
- 19 March - Wong Lam, 96, Hong Kong politician, unofficial member of the Legislative Council of Hong Kong (1976–1985).
- 24 March - Mae-Wan Ho, 74, Hong Kong geneticist.

=== April ===
- 1 April - Alan Carter, 86, British civil servant, Director of Immigration of Hong Kong (1983–1989).

=== May ===
- 27 May - Bonnie Law, 47, Hong Kong singer and actress (Happy Ghost), heart attack.

=== September ===
- 29 September - Cheng Yu-tung, 91, Hong Kong businessman (Chow Tai Fook).

=== October ===
- 4 October - Bing Thom, 75, Hong Kong-born Canadian architect, brain aneurysm.
- 16 October
  - Jia Jia, 38, Chinese giant panda, euthanized.
  - Geoffrey Yeh, 85, Hong Kong businessman.

=== November ===
- 3 November - Xia Meng, 84, Hong Kong actress.
- 24 November - Matthew Chan, 69, Hong Kong Olympic fencer (1972, 1976), cancer.

=== December ===
- 7 December - Hui Yin-fat, 80, Hong Kong social worker and politician, MLC (1985–1995), MEC (1991–1992) and member of the PLC (1996–1998).

== See also ==
- List of Hong Kong films of 2016
