= 2011 in Hong Kong =

- Decades: 1990s; 2000s; 2010s; 2020s
- See also: Other events of 2011; History of Hong Kong • Timeline • Years

Events in the year 2011 in Hong Kong.

== Incumbents ==
- Chief Executive: Donald Tsang

== Events ==
e

== See also ==
- List of Hong Kong films of 2011
