= 2019 in Hong Kong =

- Decades: 1990s; 2000s; 2010s; 2020s
- See also: Other events of 2019; History of Hong Kong • Timeline • Years

Events in the year 2019 in Hong Kong.

== Incumbents ==
=== Executive branch ===
- Chief Executive: Carrie Lam
  - Chief Secretary for Administration: Matthew Cheung
  - Financial Secretary: Paul Mo-po Chan
  - Secretary for Justice: Teresa Cheng

=== Legislative branch ===
- President of the Legislative Council: Andrew Leung

=== Judicial branch ===
- Chief Justice of the Court of Final Appeal: Geoffrey Ma

== Events ==
- 29 March – the Government gazettes the extradition bill.
- 9 April – Nine defendants, including Benny Tai, were convicted for occupying Central in 2014.
- mid-April – Scandal between Andy Hui and Jacqueline Wong broke
- 9 June – Over 1 million people in Hong Kong protest against proposed legislation regarding extradition to mainland China. It is the largest protest in Hong Kong since the 1997 handover.
- 12 June – June 12, 2019 Hong Kong protest: The Hong Kong government and police controversially declare that the protest has "turned into a riot".
- 15 June – Hong Kong government announces it will indefinitely suspend the controversial extradition bill, but protests continue, this time calling for the total withdrawal of the bill and the resignation of Chief Executive Carrie Lam.
- 16 June – Despite bill suspension on 15 June 2019, nearly 2 million people gather in Victoria Square demanding the legislation be withdrawn. If the organizers numbers are confirmed, this is the largest protest ever. Police say turnout was 338,000 at its peak. (BBC News)
- 17 June – Joshua Wong released from prison.
- 1 July – Protesters stormed LegCo.
- 21 July – After the Yuen Long attack, no arrest were made by the police upon investigation at a nearby village that night.
- 5 August – Amid ongoing protests, Hong Kong is hit by the first general strikes of their kind since 1967.
- 8 August – Disappearance of Simon Cheng by mainland Chinese police at the Hong Kong West Kowloon High Speed Rail Station.
- 12 August – Hong Kong International Airport is closed due to protests.
- 15 August – Benny Tai released on bail.
- 22 August – Protests enter their 12th week as police reintroduced water-cannons and tear gas.
- 31 August – The raptors stormed Prince Edward station, the police arrested 65 people.
- 4 September – Hong Kong Chief Executive Carrie Lam announces the official withdrawal of the controversial Fugitive Offenders and Mutual Legal Assistance in Criminal Matters Legislation (Amendment) Bill 2019, and setting up of an independent study to probe social and economic inequality within the territory.
- 22 September – Chan Yin-lam's cadaver, floating in the sea, was recovered by Marine Police.
- 4 October – Hong Kong Chief Executive Carrie Lam and the Chief Executive in Council invokes the Emergency Regulations Ordinance and banning the face mask in public gatherings with immediate effect.
- 5 October – The Prohibition on Face Covering Regulation begins.
- 10 October – Chan Yin-lam cremated.
- 23 October – Chan Tong-kai released from prison.
- 4 November – Chow Tsz-lok, who fell from height, died.
- 11 November – The conflict at Chinese University begins.
- 13 November – The Chinese University of Hong Kong officially announces a premature end to the semester as a result of large-scale protests and civil unrest. Besides CUHK, several Hong Kong universities switch to online learning and suspend on-campus class. The Education Bureau in Hong Kong officially announces to close all schools in Hong Kong due to the ongoing protests.
- 24 November – In the 2019 Hong Kong local elections, The pro-democracy camp achieved its biggest landslide victory in the history of Hong Kong, gaining control of 17 of the 18 District Councils and tripling their seats from around 124 to about 388.
- 27 November – United States signs Hong Kong Human Rights and Democracy Act that requires the U.S. government to impose sanctions against Chinese and Hong Kong officials.
- 29 November – As the siege of the Hong Kong Polytechnic University ends, the University takes back the control of the campus.

== Deaths ==
- 3 January – Michael Yeung, Roman Catholic prelate, Bishop of the Roman Catholic Diocese of Hong Kong (b. 1945).
- 12 January – Patrick Yu, barrister, Hong Kong's first Chinese prosecutor (b. 1922).
- 11 March – Peter Wong Man-kong, shipping magnate and politician (b. 1949).

== See also ==
- List of Hong Kong films of 2019
