= 1999 in Hong Kong =

- Decades: 1970s; 1980s; 1990s; 2000s; 2010s
- See also: Other events of 1999; History of Hong Kong • Timeline • Years

Events in the year 1999 in Hong Kong.

== Incumbents ==
- Chief Executive: Tung Chee-hwa

== Events ==
- 22 August - China Airlines Flight 642 crashed at Hong Kong International Airport resulting in 3 fatalities and over 200 people getting injured.
- The Ng Ka Ling v Director of Immigration and Lau Kong Yung v Director of Immigration cases, regarding the Right of abode in Hong Kong was decided.
- Hello Kitty murder

== See also ==
- List of Hong Kong films of 1999
