= 2010 in Hong Kong =

- Decades: 1990s; 2000s; 2010s; 2020s
- See also: Other events of 2010; History of Hong Kong • Timeline • Years

Events in the year 2010 in Hong Kong.

== Incumbents ==
- Chief Executive: Donald Tsang

== Events ==
- 29 August: About 80,000 people protested in the streets of Hong Kong in honour of the eight victims of the Manila hostage crisis.

== See also ==
- List of Hong Kong films of 2010
