= 2024 in Hong Kong =

- Decades: 2000s; 2010s; 2020s
- See also: Other events of 2024; History of Hong Kong • Timeline • Years

Events in the year 2024 in Hong Kong.

== Incumbents ==
Executive branch
Photo	Name	Position	Term
	John Lee	Chief Executive	30 June 2022 – present
	Eric Chan	Chief Secretary for Administration	1 July 2022 – present
	Paul Mo-po Chan	Financial Secretary	16 January 2017 – present
	Paul Ting-Kok Lam	Secretary for Justice	1 July 2022 – present

Legislative branch
Photo	Name	Position	Term
	Andrew Leung	President of the Legislative Council	12 October 2016 – present

Judicial branch
Photo	Name	Position	Term
	Andrew Cheung	Chief Justice of the Court of Final Appeal	11 January 2021 – present

=== Executive branch ===
- Chief Executive: John Lee
  - Chief Secretary for Administration: Eric Chan
  - Financial Secretary: Paul Mo-po Chan
  - Secretary for Justice: Paul Lam

=== Legislative branch ===
- President of the Legislative Council: Andrew Leung

=== Judicial branch ===
- Chief Justice of the Court of Final Appeal: Andrew Cheung

== Events ==
=== January ===
- 1 January: Members of seventh District Councils assume office.
- 9 January: The government formally grant Caritas Institute of Higher Education university status and rename to Saint Francis University, this will be the first catholic university in Hong Kong.
- 29 January: The High Court of Hong Kong orders Evergrande Group into liquidation after the real estate developer fails to restructure a debt amount in excess of US$300 billion.

=== February ===
- 4 February: Hong Kong XI lose 4-1 to Inter Miami at Hong Kong Stadium.

=== March ===
- 16 March: A court sentences 12 people to prison terms ranging from four to seven years in prison for storming LegCo in July 2019. The defendants included actor Gregory Wong and activists Ventus Lau and Owen Chow.
- 19 March: The Hong Kong Legislative Council passes the Safeguarding National Security Bill, obligated by Article 23 of HKSAR Basic Law.
- 26 March: The Executive Council of Hong Kong approves the construction of the Hung Shui Kiu MTR station, which is expected to be completed by 2030.

=== April ===
- 10 April: A fire at the New Lucky House in Jordan, Kowloon, kills five people and injures 35 others.
- 22 April : Hong Kong bans restaurants from providing single-use plastic tableware.

=== May ===
- 8 May: The Court of Appeal rules in favor of the Department of Justice, banning the protest song Glory to Hong Kong on national security grounds.
- 30 May: The High Court of Hong Kong convicts 14 pro-democracy activists in the biggest trial in Hong Kong involving the 2020 Hong Kong national security law.

=== June ===
- 6 June: British judges Jonathan Sumption and Lawrence Collins resign from the Court of Final Appeal, with Collins attributing his departure to the “political situation in Hong Kong”.
- 18 June: Chief Executive John Lee announces that the Hong Kong Stock Exchange would end its practice of shutting trading during typhoons and other extreme weather.

=== July ===
- 3 July: The Hong Kong Legislative Council passes a bill to reform the Social Workers Registration Board, increasing the number of members from 15 to 27, with the number of appointees rising from eight to 17.
- 25 July: The Digital Policy Office is established through a merger of the Office of the Government Chief Information Officer (OGCIO) with the Efficiency Office (EffO).

=== August ===
- 6 August: The national security exhibition gallery officially opens at the Hong Kong Museum of History in Tsim Sha Tsui.
- 29 August:
  - The pro-democracy news outlet Stand News and its former chief editors Chung Pui-kuen and Patrick Lam become the first defendants to be convicted of sedition in Hong Kong since its handover to China in 1997, which Chung sentenced to 21 months' imprisonment on 26 September.
  - Lai Chun-pong is convicted by a jury of planning to stage bomb attacks during the 2019–2020 Hong Kong protests. Six other defendants are acquitted.

=== September ===
- 2 September: Cathay Pacific grounds 48 of its Airbus aircraft following an engine fire on a flight heading to Zurich.
- 10–15 September: The Hong Kong Open Badminton competition is held.

=== October ===
- 13-14 October: Nine monkeys die at the Hong Kong Zoological and Botanical Gardens following an outbreak of melioidosis.
- 22 October: The Digital Policy Office orders a ban on the usage of WhatsApp, WeChat and Google Drive on government computers, citing cybersecurity concerns.
- 23 October: Experts announce the discovery of the first dinosaur fossils in Hong Kong after bones embedded in a Cretaceous-era rock in Port Island in the Hong Kong UNESCO Global Geopark are recovered.

=== November ===
- 14 November: Ng Chi-hung, who pled guilty to leading a bombing plot against police officers during the 2019 Hong Kong protests, is sentenced to 23 years and 10 months imprisonment.
- 19 November: Benny Tai, Joshua Wong and 43 other pro-democracy activists are convicted of subversion for organising the 2020 Hong Kong pro-democracy primaries and are sentenced to up to ten years' imprisonment. Two defendants are acquitted.
- 26 November: The Hong Kong Court of Final Appeal rules against the Hong Kong Housing Authority and upholds rulings in lower courts allowing same-sex couples married overseas to avail of subsidised housing and be covered by existing inheritance laws.
- 28 November: The third runway of Hong Kong International Airport is opened to aviation after eight years of construction.

== Holidays ==
- 1 January, Monday – New Year's Day
- 10 February, Saturday – Lunar New Year's Day
- 12 February, Monday – The third day of Lunar New Year
- 13 February, Tuesday – The fourth day of Lunar New Year
- 29 March, Friday – Good Friday
- 30 March, Saturday – The day following Good Friday
- 1 April, Monday – Easter Monday
- 4 April, Thursday – Ching Ming Festival
- 1 May, Wednesday – Labour Day
- 15 May, Wednesday – Buddha's Birthday
- 10 June, Monday – Tuen of The Festival
- 1 July, Monday – Hong Kong Special Administrative Region Establishment Day
- 18 September, Wednesday – The day following the Chinese Mid-Autumn Festival
- 1 October, Tuesday – National Day
- 11 October, Friday – Chung Yeung Festival
- 25 December, Wednesday – Christmas Day
- 26 December, Thursday – The first weekday after Christmas Day

== Arts and entertainment ==
- List of Hong Kong films of 2024
- List of 2024 box office number-one films in Hong Kong
- List of Hong Kong submissions for the Academy Award for Best International Feature Film

== Deaths ==
- 2 February – Gregory Charles Rivers, Australian-born actor (b. 1965)
