= 2014 in Hong Kong =

- Decades: 1990s; 2000s; 2010s; 2020s
- See also: Other events of 2014; History of Hong Kong • Timeline • Years

Hong Kong skyline viewed from Victoria Peak

The following lists events from 2014 in Hong Kong.

== Incumbents ==
- Chief Executive - Leung Chun-ying

== Events ==
=== February ===
- February 14 - The 2014 Hong Kong Marathon took place. Feyera Gemeda and Rehima Kedir won the men's and women's races in 2:15:05 and 2:34:53 hours, respectively.

=== March ===
- March - Hongkonger and Hong Kongese were officially added to the Oxford English Dictionary.
- March 28-30 - 2014 Hong Kong Sevens, a rugby tournament, took place. There were four knockout stages in the tournament and each team that won its knockout stage was declared a champion.

=== April ===
- April 13 - 33rd Hong Kong Film Awards took place.

=== July ===
- July 1 - An annual Hong Kong March took place. The march featured protest that demanded rights of citizens: democracy, universal suffrage, freedom of speech, etc. Organizers of the march said over 500,000 protesters participated.
- July - Occupy Central with Love and Peace is a proposed nonviolent occupation protest for universal suffrage. Its date is unknown, but it is scheduled for July.

=== September ===
- September 22-26 - Student groups initiated large-scale class boycott campaigns.
- September 27 - Occupy Central with Love and Peace officially started.

=== November ===
- November 11 - Following a court injunction authorising the clearance of protest sites, pro-democracy protesters in Hong Kong are warned they could face arrest if they do not leave the sites.
- November 18 - Hong Kong authorities start dismantling a protest site in Admiralty following a court order.
- November 25 - Hong Kong authorities start clearing away barricades in the district of Mong Kok.
- November 26 - More than 80 people are arrested as police dismantle a protest camp in the Mong Kok commercial district. Student leaders Joshua Wong and Lester Shum are amongst those arrested.
- November 27 - The Hong Kong Police Force arrests eleven more people in a second night of violence after removal of a camp in Mong Kok and seven police officers are arrested for alleged assault of a protester on October 15.
- November 29 - Thousands of pro-democracy demonstrators clash with police in the Mong Kok district as they try to reclaim their former protest site.

=== December ===
- December 1 - Pro-democracy demonstrators and the Hong Kong Police Force clash outside the headquarters of the Government of Hong Kong. Dozens of people are arrested.
- December 2 - C. Y. Leung, the Chief Executive of Hong Kong, warns pro-democracy activists not to return to the streets after yesterday's clashes.

== Deaths ==
=== January ===
- 5 January - Peter Rull Sr., 91, Hong Kong Olympic sport shooter.
- 7 January - Run Run Shaw, Hong Kong filmmaker and entrepreneur (b. 1907)

=== February ===
- 4 February - Wu Ma, 71, Chinese-born Hong Kong actor and director, lung cancer.

=== May ===
- 25 May - Tang Yuhan, 101, Hong Kong oncologist.
- 30 May - Joan Lorring, 88, British Hong Kong-born American actress (The Corn Is Green, Three Strangers).

=== June ===
- 4 June - George Ho, 94, American-born Chinese Hong Kong media owner (Commercial Television and Radio), recipient of the Gold Bauhinia Star (2001).

=== July ===
- 4 July - Li Fook-wo, 97, Hong Kong politician and banker (Bank of East Asia).
- 14 July - Sir Jimmy McGregor, 90, British colonial politician, member of the Hong Kong Executive Council (1995–1997) and Legislative Council (1988–1995).
- 24 July - Ian Rees Davies, 72, British dentist and university administrator, Vice-Chancellor of the University of Hong Kong (2000–2002).
- 25 July - Cheng Yang-ping, 84, Hong Kong simultaneous interpreter, Chief Interpreter (1972–1986) and Chief Conference Interpreter (1986–1987) of the Hong Kong Government.

=== August ===
- 16 August - Tsang Shu-ki, 64, Hong Kong economist and social activist (Meeting Point).

=== September ===
- 13 September - Marvin Cheung, 67, Hong Kong accountant and politician, Chairman of the AAHK (2008–2014), unofficial member of the Executive Council (2005–2012), leukemia.

=== November ===
- 16 November - Sik Kok Kwong, 95, Hong Kong Buddhist monk, President of the Hong Kong Buddhist Association (1966–2014).
- 20 November - Jimmy Heung, 64, Hong Kong film producer and director, cancer.

=== December ===
- 27 December - Ronald Li, 85, Chinese stockbroker, Chairman of the Hong Kong Stock Exchange (1986–1987), cancer.
- 29 December
  - Hari Harilela, 92, Indian-born Hong Kong hotelier.
  - Jenny Pat, 33, Hong Kong art dealer, accidental drug overdose.

== See also ==
- List of Hong Kong films of 2014
- 2014 Hong Kong electoral reform consultation
- Hong Kong at the 2014 Winter Olympics
- 2013–14 Hong Kong First Division League
- 2013–14 Hong Kong FA Cup
