= 2022 in Hong Kong =

- Decades: 2000s; 2010s; 2020s
- See also: Other events of 2022; History of Hong Kong • Timeline • Years

Events in the year 2022 in Hong Kong.

== Incumbents ==
Executive branch
Photo	Name	Position	Term
香港候任特首林鄭月娥13 cropped	Carrie Lam	Chief Executive	1 July 2017 – 30 June 2022
Lee Ka-chiu 20210826	John Lee	Chief Executive	30 June 2022 – present
Lee Ka-chiu 20210826	John Lee	Chief Secretary for Administration	25 June 2021 – 7 April 2022
	Eric Chan	Chief Secretary for Administration	1 July 2022 – present
	Paul Mo-po Chan	Financial Secretary	16 January 2017 – present
港府執意推進《逃犯條例》修法民陣謹慎動員民眾抗爭3_(cropped)	Teresa Cheng	Secretary for Justice	6 January 2018 – 30 June 2022

Legislative branch
Photo	Name	Position	Term
	Andrew Leung	President of the Legislative Council	12 October 2016 – present

Judicial branch
Photo	Name	Position	Term
	Andrew Cheung	Chief Justice of the Court of Final Appeal	11 January 2021 – present

=== Executive branch ===
- Chief Executive: Carrie Lam
  - Chief Secretary for Administration: John Lee
  - Financial Secretary: Paul Mo-po Chan
  - Secretary for Justice: Teresa Cheng

=== Legislative branch ===
- President of the Legislative Council: Andrew Leung

=== Judicial branch ===
- Chief Justice of the Court of Final Appeal: Andrew Cheung

== Events ==
=== January ===
- 3 January – The Seventh Legislative Council members take oath. It would be the inaugural Legislative Council after 2021 Hong Kong electoral changes.
- 7 January – Witman Hung partygate scandal emerges
- 12 January – The first meeting of Seventh Legislative Council held.
- Human rights lawyer Chow Hang-tung is sentenced to 15 months in prison for participating in and inciting others to join the 2021 Tiananmen vigil; she was already serving a 12-month sentence for participating in the 2020 vigil.

=== February ===
- 9 February – The first time that Hong Kong recorded more than 1,000 COVID-19 infections in one day.
- 10 February – Vaccine Pass scheme launched.
- 15 February – Chinese Communist Party leader Xi Jinping stressed to the Hong Kong government which must take the “main responsibility” in containing coronavirus pandemic and placing top priority on stability and people's lives.
- 25 February – The first time that Hong Kong recorded more than 10,000 COVID-19 infections in one day.

=== March ===
- 1 March – New Subscriber Identification Module (SIM Card) require real-name registration by the government.
- 2 March – The first time that Hong Kong recorded more than 50,000 COVID-19 infections in one day.
- 7 March – The Hong Kong Democracy Council calls for the release of pro-democracy activists in detention, citing heightened COVID-19 risks. Authorities suspend all lawyer visits to detention facilities, while families can only obtain updates via welfare officers.

=== May ===
- 8 May – 2022 Hong Kong Chief Executive election: John Lee, former security chief criticized for his role in the 2019 protests, is elected unopposed as Hong Kong Chief Executive in a Beijing-backed vote.
- 11 May – Hong Kong police arrest several pro-democracy figures under the National Security Law for “colluding with foreign forces”; former legislator Cyd Ho, already in jail, is additionally arrested the next day. All were trustees of the disbanded 612 Humanitarian Relief Fund, which the police sought to prosecute for failing to register under the Societies Ordinance.
- 15 May – MTR East Rail line extended from Hung Hom to Admiralty.

=== July ===
- 1 July –
  - The new Chief Executive John Lee Ka-chiu take office.
  - Hong Kong marks the 25th anniversary of its handover from Britain to China with an official ceremony attended by CCP General Secretary Xi Jinping. Authorities impose tight security and barriers to prevent visible dissent.

=== August ===
- 16 August – Justice Secretary Paul Lam orders a non-jury trial for 47 pro-democracy legislators and activists charged under the National Security Law, departing from Hong Kong's traditional jury system.

=== September ===
- 7 September – A Hong Kong District Court convicts five children's book authors of “conspiring to print, publish, distribute or display seditious publications” under the Crimes Ordinance for their Sheep Village series.
- 9 September – A Hong Kong judge rules in favor of a lesbian couple's parental recognition of their son, a landmark decision for LGBTQ+ rights in Hong Kong.

=== October ===
- 31 October – Hong Kong FinTech Week 2022 takes place, attracting over 30,000 visitors, 5 million online views, 500 speakers, 600 exhibitors, and 30 international delegations, under the theme “Pushing Boundaries, Reaping Benefits.”

=== November ===
- 11 November – The government gazetted approval for the construction of Kwu Tung station on the MTR Northern Link of the East Rail line.
- 17 November – “Glory to Hong Kong” is played instead of China's anthem at a Rugby Sevens final; Hong Kong authorities condemn it and launch an investigation.
- 30 November – The Small Unmanned Aircraft Order Enforced. Small unmanned aircraft (including small unmanned aerial photography aircraft) over 200 gram and remote pilots proceeds officially registration. Remote pilots who drive over 7 kg unmanned aircraft (including aerial photography aircraft) need to take training and pass the formal assessment accepted by the government.

=== December ===
- 13 December – The Hong Kong High Court adjourns the trial of pro-democracy media tycoon Jimmy Lai until 25 September 2023. Lai and six co-defendants faced national security charges, including “collusion with foreign forces” and sedition, which could carry life sentences.

== Arts and entertainment ==
- List of Hong Kong films of 2022
- List of 2022 box office number-one films in Hong Kong
- 40th Hong Kong Film Awards — 17 July 2022
- Hong Kong International Film Festival — 15 August to 31 August 2022
- Ultimate Song Chart Awards Presentation 2021 – 1 January 2022
- 2022 Hong Kong Masters – 6–9 October 2022

== Deaths ==
- 4 January – Hilton Cheong-Leen, politician (b. 1922)
