= 2018 in Hong Kong =

- Decades: 1990s; 2000s; 2010s; 2020s
- See also: Other events of 2018; History of Hong Kong • Timeline • Years

Events in the year 2018 in Hong Kong.

== Incumbents ==
=== Executive branch ===
- Chief Executive: Carrie Lam
  - Chief Secretary for Administration: Matthew Cheung
  - Financial Secretary: Paul Mo-po Chan
  - Secretary for Justice: Rimsky Yuen (until 5 January), then Teresa Cheng

=== Legislative branch ===
- President of the Legislative Council: Andrew Leung

=== Judicial branch ===
- Chief Justice of the Court of Final Appeal: Geoffrey Ma

== Events ==
=== January ===
- 1 January
  - The New Year's Day March, organised by Civil Human Rights Front, takes place. Demonstrators from the "Co-location" Concern Group and People Power enter the East Wing Forecourt of the Central Government Complex, also known as "Civic Square", after the march ended. Scuffles occur between protesters and security guards.
  - The Sleeping Beauty Castle at Hong Kong Disneyland closes, and the last performance of the Disney in the Stars firework show takes place. This is to make way for the transformation of the Sleeping Beauty Castle.
- 3 January
  - Frankly Chu, a retired superintendent, is found guilty of assault occasioning bodily harm and jailed for three months, for hitting a pedestrian with a baton in Mong Kok during the 2014 Hong Kong protests. He is released immediately on bail pending appeal.
  - The balloting procedure for the sale of the subsidised housing Terrace Concerto (in Tuen Mun) and Mount Verdant (in Tseung Kwan O) takes place.
- 5 January
  - The State Council approves the appointment of Teresa Cheng as the Secretary for Justice, replacing Rimsky Yuen, who had resigned earlier.
  - Cleaning workers at Hoi Lai Estate in Cheung Sha Wan end a 10-day strike.
  - An investigation by Queen Mary Hospital finds the behaviour of Kelvin Kwok-chai Ng, a former part-time associate professor at the hospital and the University of Hong Kong (HKU), 'unacceptable' and 'unnecessary'. On 13 October 2017, he left a liver transplant operation for another planned surgery in a private hospital. The report does not specify any penalty or responsibility. Ng accepts the report and hopes to become a full-time employee at the university. In late February, HKU's Li Ka Shing Faculty of Medicine announces Ng's contract will not be renewed. Ng has since become a consultant at the University of Hong Kong-Shenzhen Hospital.
- 6 January – Suspected unauthorised structures are found at the homes of Teresa Cheng, the Secretary for Justice, and her husband Otto Lok-to Poon at Villa De Mer, Tuen Mun.
- 8 January – Patrick Ho, former Secretary for Home Affairs, pleads not guilty in New York City, to federal charges that he had bribed officials from Chad and Uganda.
- 9 January
  - The Buildings Department confirms the presence of unauthorised structures at the homes of Teresa Cheng and her husband Otto Lok-to Poon, including a basement, a rooftop glasshouse, a pond, and an extended wall on the ground floor.
  - The father and stepmother of 5-year-old Sui-lam Chan, who allegedly died due to child abuse, appear in court. The prosecution says Chan was hurled up and hit the ceiling before her death, and both her and her brother have been repeatedly assaulted by bamboo sticks and scissors.
  - Benny Tai, Chan Kin-man, Chu Yiu-ming, Tanya Chan, Shiu Ka-chun, Tommy Cheung, Yiu-wa Chung, Raphael Wong and Lee Wing-tat appear in court for charges of public nuisance during the 2014 Hong Kong protests.
- 14 January – A 42-year-old South Korean man is arrested for murdering his wife of the same age and 6-year-old son at The Ritz-Carlton, Hong Kong.
- 17 January – 16 participants of the 2014 Hong Kong protests, including Joshua Wong, Lester Shum and Raphael Wong are found guilty of failing to comply with a court order. Joshua Wong and Raphael Wong are sentenced to jail, while Shum and the other defendants receive suspended sentences.
- 18 January
  - Edward Leung and 5 other protesters during the 2016 Mong Kok civil unrest appear in court for charges including rioting. Ray Wong and another protester fail to appear in court and are issued arrest warrants.
  - Philip Dykes is elected as the next chairperson of the Bar Council of the Hong Kong Bar Association, defeating incumbent Paul Lam.
- 24 January – Tsz-kei Lau, the president of Hong Kong Baptist University (HKBU) Students' Union, and Andrew Lok-hang Chan, a fifth-year student at the HKBU School of Chinese Medicine, are suspended for violating the students' code of conduct, until a disciplinary investigation into their protest on 17 January is complete. Over 10 students, including Lau and Chan, protested at the Language Centre for 8 hours, and demanded more transparency in an exemption test for an otherwise mandatory Putonghua course. A video clip later showed Lau speaking profanity to staff members.
- 26 January – The Hang Seng Index closes at an all-time high, at 33,154.12 points.
- 27 January – Agnes Chow, a member of Demosistō, is barred from standing in the March 2018 Hong Kong by-elections, on the grounds that her party advocates for self-determination for Hong Kong.
- 31 January
  - Electoral officials bar Ventus Lau from running in the March 2018 Hong Kong by-elections, based on previous comments he had made in support of Hong Kong independence. The candidacy of Au Nok-hin, who runs in the place of Agnes Chow, is confirmed.
  - An unexploded bomb from World War II is found in a construction site in Wan Chai, the second one in 5 days.

=== February ===
- 1 February
  - Localist camp Sha Tin District Councillor James Kwok-keung Chan becomes the third candidate disqualified from the March 2018 Hong Kong by-elections.
  - United States lawmakers nominate Joshua Wong, Nathan Law, Alex Chow and other contributors to the Umbrella Movement for the Nobel Peace Prize.
- 6 February – The Court of Final Appeal overturns the decision of the Court of Appeal by ruling to free Joshua Wong, Nathan Law and Alex Chow, who were charged for their entering of the East Wing Forecourt of the Central Government Office during the 2014 Hong Kong protests. The court rules the sentencing guideline endorsed by the Court of Appeal should not be applied retroactively.
- 9 February – Hang Seng Index closes at 29507 points, falling over 3000 points and marking the greatest weekly drop by points.
- 10 February – A Kowloon Motor Bus double-decker bus running on route 872 tips over on Tai Po Road near Tai Po Mei in Tai Po, killing 19 people and injuring 66. The driver allegedly lost control of the bus while making a turn. Victims say passengers have yelled at the driver for departing Sha Tin Racecourse late.
- 12 February – Albert Kwai-huen Wong, chairman of the Communications Authority, resigns as he announces his failure to disclose the ownership of China Mobile stocks.
- 13 February – The High Court dismisses the election petition submitted by Ho-tin Chan, convenor of the Hong Kong National Party and rules returning officers can ban candidates from running when their political views suggest they would not uphold the Basic Law.
- 14 February – The Court of First Instance upholds the requirement that foreign domestic workers in Hong Kong must live with their employers.
- 17 February – The annual ritual of drawing fortune sticks (also known as kau chim) takes place at Che Kung Miu. Kenneth Ip-keung Lau, chairperson of the Heung Yee Kuk, and Che-kee Lee, vice-chairperson of the Sha Tin Rural Committee, each draws a stick on behalf of Hong Kong and Sha Tin District respectively. The master of ceremonies mixes up the sticks, and Lau says it was arranged by the deity Che Kung.
- 20 February – The Hong Kong Exchanges and Clearing reopens its trading hall after renovation, renaming it the HKEX Connect Hall, which also houses the HKEX Museum of Finance.
- 24 February – Wai-yan Wan, brother of Wesley Wan and son of the former member of the Chinese People's Political Consultative Conference Tommy Tai-min Wan, dies from a car crash in Sai Wan. He is suspected to be having a heart attack before losing control of his car.
- 28 February – Financial Secretary Paul Mo-po Chan releases the Budget for the 2018–19 fiscal year.

=== March ===
- 5 March – The West Kowloon Magistrates' Court dismisses a charge of contempt of the Legislative Council against then-lawmaker Kwok-hung Leung, ruling the charge does not apply to lawmakers.
- 11 March – The March 2018 Hong Kong by-elections takes place for vacancies resulting from the disqualification of legislative councillors over the 2016 oath-taking controversy. The four vacancies are the Hong Kong Island, Kowloon West and New Territories East geographical constituencies and the Architectural, Surveying, Planning and Landscape functional constituency. The opposition pan-democrats and pro-government camp each win two seats. Vincent Wing-shun Cheng of the Democratic Alliance for the Betterment and Progress of Hong Kong becomes the first pro-government candidate to win in a geographical constituency by-election.
- 16 March
  - Ka-shing Li, Hong Kong's richest person and chairman of CK Hutchison Holdings and CK Asset Holdings, announces his retirement after the annual general meeting on 10 May.
  - The government submits the outline of the National Anthem Bill to the Legislative Council.
  - The High Court sentences Cheung-fai Lau to life imprisonment for sexually assaulting and murdering a 15-year-old part-time model.
- 23 March
  - Financial Secretary Paul Mo-po Chan announces the Caring and Sharing Scheme after criticisms of the Budget. The scheme will see all Hong Kong residents aged 18 years or above who do not own property, are not under government allowance and do not pay income tax receiving HKD$4000. Residents who are eligible for tax breaks announced in the Budget will receive the difference between the concessionary amount and HKD$4000.
  - The train to run on the Guangzhou–Shenzhen–Hong Kong Express Rail Link is named Vibrant Express.
- 27 March
  - HKTV announces it will withdraw the application for domestic free-to-air television programme service licence submitted to the Communications Authority in April 2014, and will surrender its mobile television license.
  - The MTR Corporation announces a fare increase of 3.14% beginning June 2018, prompting backlash against the profitmaking and sole rail company in Hong Kong.

=== April ===
- 18 April – Hong Kong Broadband Network acknowledges a breach at an inactive customer database, affecting about 380,000 clients.
- 25 April – Opposition pan-democrat lawmaker Chi-fung Hui admits to and apologises for taking the phone of a female Security Bureau employee and then running into a men's washroom in the Legislative Council Complex during a committee meeting on 24 April. The employee was locating pro-government lawmakers in the Legislative Council Complex to ensure a sufficient number of them would turn up for the committee meeting, which has been debating a government bill for juxtaposed border control at the Hong Kong West Kowloon railway station.
- 26 April – The Task Force on Land Supply begins a 5-month public consultation on increasing land supply.

=== May ===
- 5 May – Opposition pan-democrat legislative councillor Chi-fung Hui is arrested over the phone-snatching incident on 24 April.
- 10 May – Ka-shing Li, Hong Kong's richest person officially retires and steps down as chairman of CK Hutchison Holdings and CK Asset Holdings, after holding his last meeting with shareholders.
- 11 May – A woman falls into an elevator shaft and dies at Paris Court in Sheung Wan Town Centre.
- 16 May – While covering a hearing on human rights lawyer Yanyi Xie in Beijing, a Now TV journalist is injured, handcuffed, dragged into a van and arrested by police officers. This comes after a Hong Kong Cable Television journalist is assaulted in Sichuan when reporting on the 10th anniversary of the 2008 Sichuan earthquake.
- 17 May – Localist camp lawmaker Chung-tai Cheng keeps his seat, after the Legislative Council voted not to censure him for turning national and Hong Kong flag replicas upside down in 2016.
- 18 May – Edward Leung is found guilty of rioting for his role in the 2016 Mong Kok civil unrest, but is cleared of inciting a riot.
- 30 May – Construction errors are reported at the underground platforms in Hung Hom station, part of the Sha Tin to Central Link. In 2015, Leighton Contractors (Asia), after being informed of defects in many couplers into which reinforcing bars were supposed to be screwed to form two main structural walls, allegedly ordered to shorten the bars to fit into the damaged couplers. The MTR Corporation says the error has been rectified soon after detecting 'workmanship deficiencies' in late 2015, and insists the platform is safe. The government later asks the company to submit a report within one week and to arrange load testing on the platform.

=== June ===
- 1 June – The Hong Kong Observatory cancels the Very Hot Weather Warning, which has been in effect for 348 consecutive hours, the longest streak since its conception in 2000.
- 4 June
  - The annual vigil commemorating the anniversary of the 1989 Tiananmen Square protests and massacre takes place at Victoria Park. The organiser estimates 110,000 people attended, while the police puts the figure at 17,000.
  - The Independent Commission Against Corruption charges celebrity tutor Weslie Chi-yung Siao, professionally known as Yuen Siu, and three other people, including his wife, for illegally obtaining and leaking confidential questions from the Hong Kong Diploma of Secondary Education, the public university entrance examination.
- 11 June – Edward Leung is sentenced to 6 years in jail for rioting and 12 months for assaulting a police officer during the 2016 Mong Kok civil unrest, to be served concurrently. Two other protesters, Lo Kin-man and Wong Ka-kui, have been jailed for 7 and 3 1/2 years respectively for rioting.
- 12 June – Construction issues are revealed at an underground platform in To Kwa Wan station, part of the Sha Tin to Central Link. A layer of steels bars supposed to reinforce a wall, which goes through three floors of lobby and underground platforms, is found removed. The MTR Corporation admits a contractor has notified it and has assured the structural safety of the wall.
- 14 June – The Legislative Council passes the Guangzhou–Shenzhen–Hong Kong Express Rail Link (Co-location) Bill by 40 to 20. This will allow for a juxtaposed border checkpoint at the West Kowloon station, operated jointly by Hong Kong and mainland border security departments and with mainland border security officers stationed.
- 26 June – A woman shoots her relatives with a handgun over an inheritance dispute, killing 1 and injuring 3.
- 28 June – Jason Chuk-Hung Poon, managing director of China Technology Corporation, a subcontractor of the Hung Hom station project, say his staff has notified him of the construction error in July 2015, and that he has witnessed workers wearing uniforms of Leighton Asia, the main contractor, cutting steel bars using dedicated equipment.
- 29 June – Chief executive Carrie Lam announces 6 new policies to tackle the housing crisis, including changing how the prices of subsidised flats are determined, and a fee on newly built flats left vacant for a year or more.

=== July ===
- 1 July – The annual 1 July March, organised by the Civil Human Rights Front, takes place. Organisers estimate 50,000 people took part, while the police say 9,800 joined, the lowest turnout recorded by both sides since 2003.
- 4 July – The Court of Final Appeal rules a spousal visa should be granted to the same-sex partner of an expatriate.
- 11 July – Results of the 2018 Hong Kong Diploma of Secondary Education examination are released.
- 20 July – Former Chief executive Donald Tsang loses his appeal against a conviction of misconduct in public office. His jail sentence is reduced from 20 to 12 months.
- 24 July – The Hong Kong Monetary Authority unveils the 2018 series of Hong Kong banknotes.
- 29 July – The Sai Yeung Choi Street South pedestrian zone closes at 10 pm and returns to full vehicular use.

=== August ===
- 1 August – The Producer Responsibility Scheme on Waste Electrical and Electronic Equipment comes into effect, covering the sale of air conditioners, refrigerators, washing machines, televisions, computers, printers, scanners and monitors. Retailers are required to provide free removal service of old appliances to customers that purchase new products of the same type. Producers of these products are also asked to pay a recycling levy per item to the government.
- 7 August – The Transport and Housing Bureau says the MTR Corporation may have provided the government with falsified data relating to construction at Hung Hom station, and that the issue has been referred to the police. The MTR later announces that Projects Director Dr Philco Nai-keung Wong has resigned with immediate effect, alongside three other managers. Chief executive officer Lincoln Kwok-kuen Leong, whose term will end in 2020, will also retire early. The government has asked Frederick Ma to stay as chairman, despite his twice offer to resign, to lead the search for a new CEO.
- 14 August – Hong Kong independence activist and Hong Kong National Party convenor Ho-tin Chan gives a talk at the Foreign Correspondents' Club (FCC), chaired by Victor Mallet, FCC vice-chairman and Asia news editor at the Financial Times. The government expresses regrets that the FCC hosted the event. This triggers the Victor Mallet visa controversy.
- 16 August – The Central Government announces residents of Hong Kong, Macau and Taiwan who work and live in mainland China can apply for identity cards beginning 1 September, which will enable them to access public services similar to mainland residents.
- 17 August – The West Kowloon Cultural District Authority, which is in charge of managing the West Kowloon Cultural District, terminates the contract for the M+ museum with Hsin Chong Construction because of the latter's insolvency.
- 23 August – The High Court rules airport security rules were breached when in 2016, airline staff carried luggage which Chung-yan Leung, daughter of then-Chief Executive Chun-ying Leung, has left behind at the check-in counter through security screening directly to her at the boarding gate. Chun-ying Leung has personally spoken to airline staff over the phone before the incident.
- 24 August – Artistic gymnast Wai Hung Shek defends his title at the 2018 Asian Games, claiming the second gold medal for Hong Kong.
- 28 August – Kie-chung Cheung, an associate professor at the Department of Mechanical Engineering of the University of Hong Kong and a member of the governing council of the university, is arrested for murdering his wife at Wei Lun Hall, a residential building of which he is a warden.
- 31 August – The Independent Commission Against Corruption charges Wilson Wing-yip Fung, then-Deputy Secretary for Economic Development and Labour, with accepting an advantage as a public servant and misconduct in public office, and Ung-iok Chan, sister-in-law of Stanley Ho, with offering an advantage to a public servant.

=== September ===
- 5 September – 13 protesters who have been jailed for their role in a 2014 protest at the Legislative Council against the government-proposed northeast New Territories development plan, win an appeal against their sentences at the Court of Final Appeal, and are immediately released.
- 14 September – Frankly Chu, a retired superintendent found guilty of assaulting a pedestrian with a baton in Mong Kok during the 2014 Hong Kong protests, loses an appeal and jailed immediately to serve his remaining prison term.
- 16 September – The Hong Kong Observatory (HKO) issues Tropical Cyclone Signal Number 10, the highest level in the warning system, as Typhoon Mangkhut hits Hong Kong. This is the second year in a row that the top typhoon warning is issued; last year's Typhoon Hato was also classified as a Number 10 typhoon.
- 17 September – The HKO lowers the typhoon warning to Number 3, as Typhoon Mangkhut leaves Hong Kong. Most bus routes are suspended due to fallen trees, and water and electricity at some neighbourhoods, including Heng Fa Chuen, Cheung Chau and Yuen Long are suspended. There is severe flooding around residential blocks at Heng Fa Chuen and inside Paradise Mall, the shopping centre of the housing estate.
- 19 September – Malaysian native Kim-sun Khaw, an associate professor in anaesthesiology at the Chinese University of Hong Kong and an anaesthetist at the Prince of Wales Hospital, is found guilty of murdering his wife and daughter in 2015, by filling up a leaky yoga ball with carbon monoxide and putting it in his car. He is sentenced to life imprisonment.
- 23 September – The Hong Kong section of the Guangzhou–Shenzhen–Hong Kong Express Rail Link starts operation.
- 24 September – The government bans the Hong Kong National Party.
- 28 September – Researchers from the University of Hong Kong discovers the first human case of rat hepatitis E in a 56-year-old man from Hong Kong.

=== October ===
- 5 October – Victor Mallet, vice-chairman of the Foreign Correspondents' Club and Asia news editor at the Financial Times, is denied renewal of his work visa, after he chaired an event in August where Hong Kong independence activist and Hong Kong National Party convenor Ho-tin Chan gave a speech.
- 10 October – Chief executive Carrie Lam delivers her second Policy address. Policies announced include the Lantau Tomorrow Vision, in which a 1700-hectare artificial island is planned, and a total ban on electronic cigarettes.
- 12 October – Siu-lai Lau is barred from running in November 2018 Kowloon West by-election for her advocacy of self-determination for Hong Kong. She was running to win back her seat in the by-election, after being disqualified from the Legislative Council over her way of taking the oath of office.
- 16 October – A signalling error causes severe service delay on 4 major MTR lines.
- 18 October – The Immigration Department announces a 4-year replacement procedure for new Hong Kong identity card.
- 22 October – A land developer applies to the judiciary for a redevelopment of the State Theatre, a Grade I historic building, and claims will conserve part of the building.
- 24 October
  - The Hong Kong–Zhuhai–Macau Bridge opens.
  - Cathay Pacific and its subsidiary Cathay Dragon admits to data leakage of about 9.4 million passengers.
- 25 October – Paternity leave increases from 3 to 5 days.
- 30 October – The Hang Seng Management College is officially granted university status, becoming the second private university in Hong Kong.

=== November ===
- 1 November – The government announces the non-means-tested Public Transport Fare Subsidy Scheme, effective 1 January 2019.
- 8 November
  - Exiled Chinese writer and dissident Jian Ma announces on Twitter his speaking events were cancelled by Tai Kwun Center for Heritage and Arts, where the talks would take place. Tai Kwun cites not wanting the arts centre 'to become a platform to promote the political interests of any individual' as the reason.
  - Victor Mallet, former vice-chairman of the Foreign Correspondents' Club and Asia news editor at the Financial Times, is denied entry into Hong Kong as a visitor, weeks after he was refused a work visa renewal.
- 11 November – Mainland border security is found, since 2012, occupying a piece of private land at Sha Tau Kok within the Frontier Closed Area and using it for farming, without the permission of the landowner or the Hong Kong government. The government later says it will 'actively follow up' on the report.
- 25 November – The November 2018 Kowloon West by-election takes place for the Kowloon West geographical constituency. The vacancy results from the disqualification of legislative councillors over the 2016 oath-taking controversy. Hoi-yan Chan from the pro-government camp wins. The opposition pan-democrats fails to regain a majority in the geographical constituencies and, hence, veto power.
- 29 November – Data leakage at credit reporting agency TransUnion is reported. Credit reports of high-profile figures were obtained easily due to inadequate online authentication. TransUnion has since suspended its online service.
- 30 November
  - 5 people are dead and more than 30 people are injured as a coach carrying employees working at the Hong Kong International Airport crashes into a taxi at Tsing Yi.
  - The Dutiable Commodities (Amendment) Ordinance 2018 takes effect, banning the sale of alcohol in vending machines and to people under 18 years old.
  - Rex Tso announces his return to amateur career and his goal to qualify for the 2020 Summer Olympics.

=== December ===
- 2 December – Lawmaker Eddie Chu is barred from standing in the a rural representative election on the grounds of his implicit support of self-determination for Hong Kong.
- 4 December – Patrick Ho, former Secretary for Home Affairs, is found guilty of bribing officials from Chad and Uganda.
- 10 December – An empty school bus rolls downhill after the driver has exited the vehicle at North Point, killing 4 people and injuring 11.
- 12 December
  - HKD $1000 banknotes of the 2018 series enters circulation.
  - The Department of Justice decides not to charge former-Chief Executive Chun-ying Leung for corruption due to insufficient evidence, while the Independent Commission Against Corruption also announces no further investigative action will be taken. Chun-ying Leung signed an agreement with Australian engineering firm UGL as part of a takeover deal with DTZ, of which he is a director, to prevent him joining any rival firm within 2 years. He received part of the HKD $50 million payment after he became chief executive in 2012.
- 13 December – The Court of First Instance rules juxtaposed border checkpoint at the Hong Kong West Kowloon railway station is constitutional, and mainland border security officers can continue operating at the station.
- 18 December – Hong Kong Children's Hospital goes into operation.
- 21 December
  - Secretary for Justice Teresa Cheng is not charged for unauthorised structures at her home, while her husband Otto Lok-to Poon is charged for the same offence at his home.
  - The government announces the ratio of public to private housing supply each year will change from 6:4 to 7:3.
- 28 December – The construction and operation contracts for Kai Tak Sports Park is awarded to a consortium led by New World Development.
- 31 December – The report drafted by the Task Force on Land Supply is released, where they suggests 8 options to increase land supply.

== Deaths ==
Yichang Liu

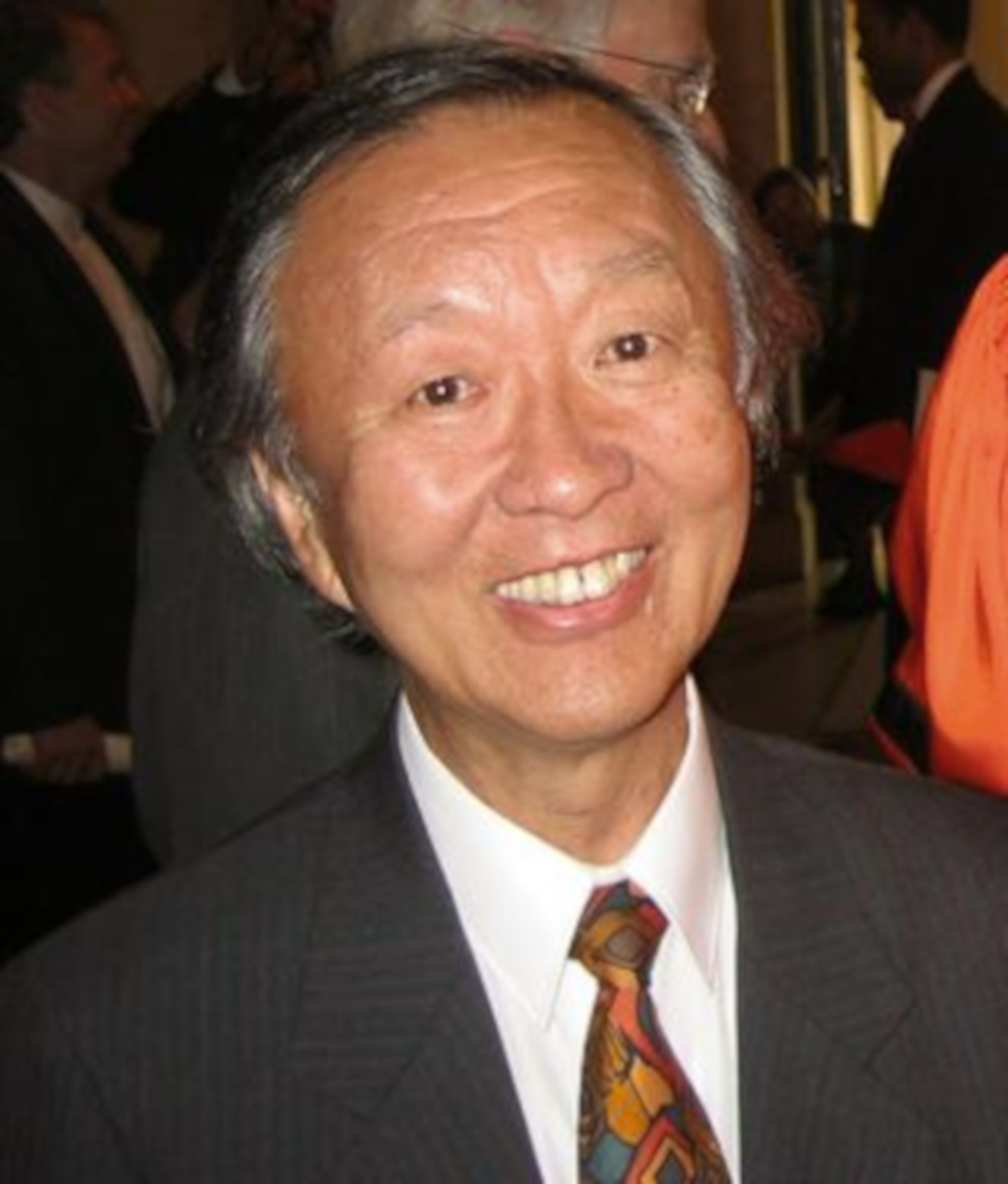
Charles K. Kao

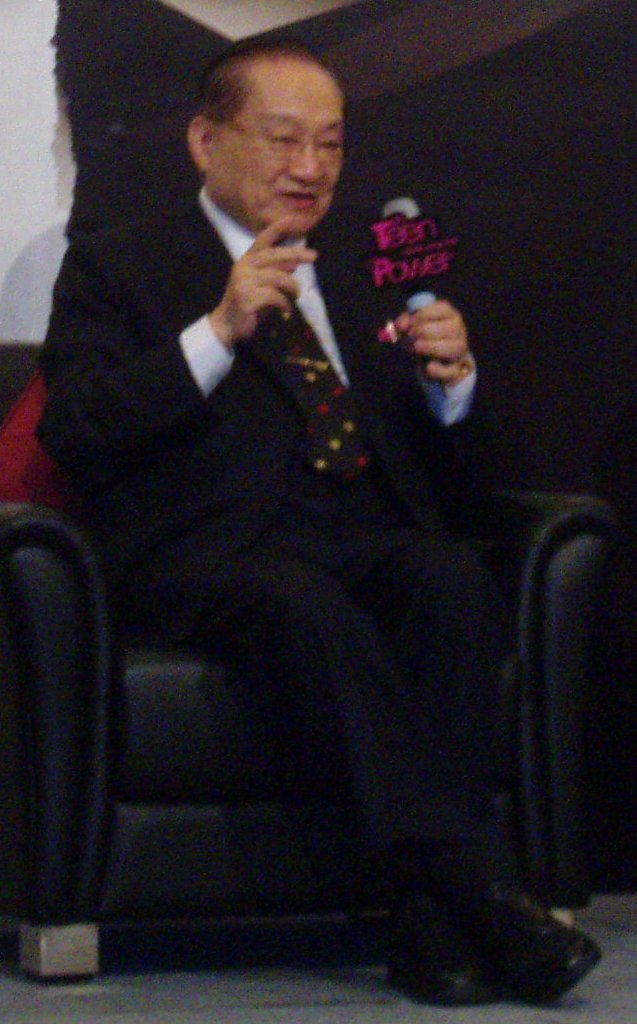
Yong Jin

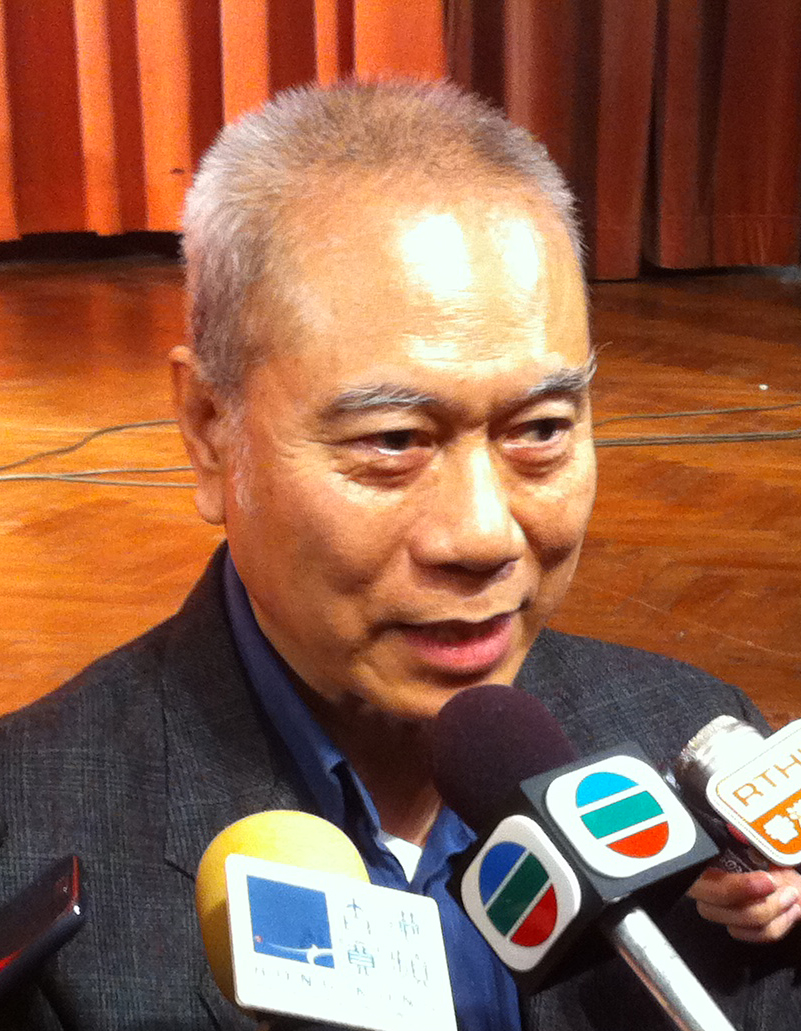
Nai-keung Lau

- 26 January
  - Yim-ping Chau So, politician (b. 1927)
  - Michael Wright, architect (b. 1912)
- 6 February – Tsung-I Jao, sinologist, historian, calligrapher and painter (b. 1917).
- 22 February – Ching Li, actress (b. 1948) (death announced on this day)
- 10 March – Hsiang Chien Tang, textile industrialist and father of Henry Tang (b. 1923)
- 27 March – Sui-kau Chan, industrialist and philanthropist (b. 1926).
- 3 April – Kelly Chen Lai
- 31 May – Eunice Lam, writer, columnist and socialite (b. 1943). (death announced on this day)
- 8 June – Yichang Liu, writer, newspaper editor and publisher, considered the founder of modern literature in Hong Kong (b. 1918).
- 10 July – Ka Ping Tin, entrepreneur and philanthropist (b. 1919).
- 29 July – Yei-ching Chow, entrepreneur (b. 1935)
- 5 August – Ellen Joyce Loo, singer-songwriter (b. 1986).
- 13 August – Gerald Nazareth, retired judge (b. 1932).
- 30 August – Ray, professional wrestler (birth year unknown).
- 11 September – Fou-li Tchan, photographer (b. 1916).
- 20 September – Ching-yuen Huang, children's literature writer (b. 1920).
- 23 September – Charles Kao, electrical engineer, physicist, Nobel Prize laureate and former president and vice-chancellor of Chinese University of Hong Kong (b. 1933).
- 20 October
  - Walter Kwok, real estate developer, former chairman and CEO of Sun Hung Kai Properties (b. 1950).
  - Wah Ngok, actor (b. 1942).
- 30 October – Yong Jin, novelist, newspaper editor (b. 1924).
- 2 November – Raymond Chow, film producer (b. 1927).
- 3 November – Yammie Lam, actress (b. 1963). (death announced on this day)
- 14 November – Sze-yuen Chung, retired politician (b. 1917).
- 21 November – Nai-keung Lau, politician (b. 1947).
- 3 December – Florence Hui, politician (b. 1974).

== See also ==
- List of Hong Kong films of 2018
