= 2017 in Hong Kong =

- Decades: 1990s; 2000s; 2010s; 2020s
- See also: Other events of 2017; History of Hong Kong • Timeline • Years

Events in the year 2017 in Hong Kong.

== Incumbents ==
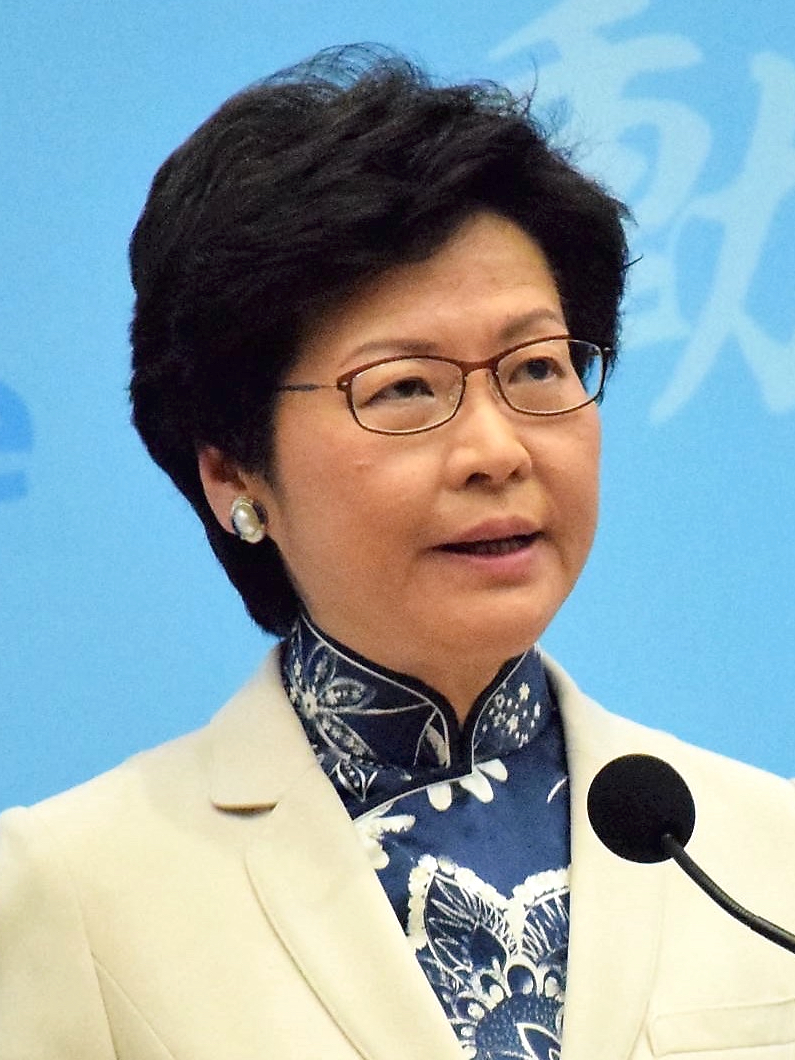
Carrie Lam

- Chief Executive: Leung Chun-ying (until 30 June); Carrie Lam (from 1 July)

== Events ==
- July 17 - Leung Kwok-hung, Nathan Law, Yiu Chung-yim and Lau Siu-lai were disqualified from LegCo membership.
- 7 September 2017, The Education University of Hong Kong's main campus in Tai Po displayed a message of "congratulations" to Undersecretary for Education Christine Choi Yuk-lin after her son plunged to his death from a residential tower. On 8 September 2017, Chief Executive Carrie Lam condemned the poster in the Education University was "extremely callous" and "cold blooded".
- Hong Kong businessman and former ophthalmologist Patrick Ho and Cheikh Gadio (former Foreign Minister of Senegal) were arrested in New York in late November 2017, charged with violating the Foreign Corrupt Practices Act and money laundering. The US Justice Department alleged that the pair offered a US$2 million bribe to the president of Chad for oil rights, and deposited a US$500,000 bribe to an account designated by the Minister of Foreign Affairs of Uganda on behalf of CEFC.
- December - Rimsky Yuen tendered resignation from Secretary for Justice.

== Notable deaths ==
- 1 January – Alfonso Wong, cartoonist (born 1923).
- 2 January – Barbara Fei, opera singer (born 1931).

== See also ==
- List of Hong Kong films of 2017
