= 2015 in Hong Kong =

- Decades: 1990s; 2000s; 2010s; 2020s
- See also: Other events of 2015; History of Hong Kong • Timeline • Years

Hong Kong skyline viewed from Victoria Peak.

The following lists events from 2015 in Hong Kong.

== Incumbents ==
- Chief Executive - Leung Chun-ying

== Events ==
=== January ===
- 14, 19 and 21 January - 6th Hong Kong International Chamber Music Festival
- 19–22 January - HKTDC Hong Kong Fashion Week for fall and winter.

=== February ===
- 1 February - Pro-democracy protesters peaceful return to the streets of Hong Kong for the first time since the end of Occupy Central protests in December.

=== April ===
- 1 April - The Executive Council of Hong Kong announced that Asia Television's television licence will not be renewed, the first time this has happened. Meanwhile HK Television Entertainment is awarded a new television licence.

== Deaths ==
=== May ===
- 9 May - Lo Wing-lok, 60, Hong Kong politician, member of the Legislative Council for Medical (2000–2004), lung cancer. (b. 1954)
- 16 May - Yeung Kwong, 89, Hong Kong pro-communist activist.

== See also ==
- List of Hong Kong films of 2015
