= 2025 in Hong Kong =

- Decades: 2000s; 2010s; 2020s
- See also: Other events of 2025; History of Hong Kong • Timeline • Years

Events in the year 2025 in Hong Kong.

== Incumbents ==
Executive branch
Photo	Name	Position	Term
	John Lee	Chief Executive	1 July 2022 – present
	Eric Chan	Chief Secretary for Administration	1 July 2022 – present
	Paul Mo-po Chan	Financial Secretary	16 January 2017 – present
	Paul Ting-Kok Lam	Secretary for Justice	1 July 2022 – present

Legislative branch
Photo	Name	Position	Term
	Andrew Leung	President of the Legislative Council	12 October 2016 – 31 December 2025

Judicial branch
Photo	Name	Position	Term
	Andrew Cheung	Chief Justice of the Court of Final Appeal	11 January 2021 – present

== Events ==
=== January ===
- 1 January – A crash involving five vehicles along the West Kowloon Highway near the Olympian City complex leaves three people dead and four others injured.

=== February ===
- 4 February – The United States Postal Service indefinitely suspends its acceptance of parcels from China and Hong Kong.
- 27 February – Former Legislative Council member Lam Cheuk-ting is sentenced to three years' imprisonment on charges of inciting violence during the 2019 Yuen Long attack.

=== March ===
- 11 March – Social worker Jackie Chen is convicted of rioting during the 2019–2020 Hong Kong protests.
- 31 March – The United States imposes sanctions on Justice Secretary Paul Lam, security office director Dong Jingwei, police commissioner Raymond Siu and two deputies, and Committee for Safeguarding National Security secretary-general Sonny Au, for their role in persecuting exiled pro-democracy activists.

=== April ===
- 10 April – British MP Wera Hobhouse, a member of the Inter-Parliamentary Alliance on China, is denied entry to Hong Kong for undisclosed reasons.

=== May ===
- 30 May – Signing of the Convention on the Establishment of the International Organisation for Mediation (IOMed).

=== June ===
- 12 June – The homes of six people are raided in the first publicly known joint operation by Hong Kong and mainland Chinese authorities under the 2020 Hong Kong national security law.
- 29 June – The pro-democracy League of Social Democrats announces its dissolution.

=== July ===
- 16 July – The government introduces the Registration of Same-sex Partnerships Bill, which proposes to grant limited legal rights to same-sex couples who have entered into marriages or civil unions overseas.
- 20 July – Tropical Storm Wipha hits Hong Kong, causing flight cancellations, fallen trees, and displacement of over 250 people.
- 23 July – High Court Judge Russell Coleman orders the suspension of regulations criminalising the use of bathrooms designated for the opposite sex following a petition by a transgender applicant.
- 25 July – The government places a HK$200,000 bounty on 19 members of the overseas pro-democracy organization Hong Kong Parliament.

=== August ===
- 4 August – Hong Kong cancels passports and bans financial support for 16 overseas activists under the national security law.
- 13 August – A court in Hong Kong convicts former J-pop idol Kenshin Kamimura for sexually molesting a female interpreter and related incidents during a fan meeting in the territory in March.

=== September ===
- 9–14 September – The Hong Kong Open Badminton competition is held.
- 9 September – High Court Judge Russell Coleman rules in favor of a petition by a lesbian couple seeking to be recognised as the parents of a child born after undergoing reciprocal in vitro fertilization in South Africa.
- 10 September – The Legislative Council votes against a bill that would have granted limited rights to same-sex couples who were married overseas.
- 18 September – A World War II-era bomb weighing about 450 kg (990 lb) is discovered at a construction site in Quarry Bay, forcing the evacuation of 6,000 residents.
- 24 September – Typhoon Ragasa passes near Hong Kong, injuring at least 90 people.

=== October ===
- 15 October – The Legislative Council passes a bill that would require operating licences from online ride-hailing services.
- 20 October – Emirates SkyCargo Flight 9788, a Boeing 747 operated by Air ACT on behalf of Emirates SkyCargo, crashes into a airport security vehicle at Hong Kong International Airport before falling into the sea, killing the two people on board the vehicle.

=== November ===
- 26 November – 168 people are killed in a fire that sweeps through several apartment blocks of the Wang Fuk Court estate in Tai Po.

=== December ===
- 7 December – 2025 Hong Kong legislative election
- 14 December – The pro-democracy Democratic Party announces its dissolution.
- 15 December – Media magnate and Beijing critic Jimmy Lai is convicted on charges of violating the national security law.
- 18 December – Around 1 billion yen (HK$50 million) is stolen following a robbery targeting four suitcases carried by two employees of a Japanese cryptocurrency and luxury goods company in Sheung Wan.

== Holidays ==
- 1 January, Wednesday – New Year's Day
- 29 January, Wednesday – Lunar New Year's Day
- 30 January, Thursday – The second day of Lunar New Year
- 31 January, Friday – The third day of Lunar New Year
- 4 April, Friday – Ching Ming Festival
- 18 April, Friday – Good Friday
- 19 April, Saturday – The day following Good Friday
- 21 April, Monday – Easter Monday
- 1 May, Thursday – Labour Day
- 5 May, Monday – Buddha's Birthday
- 31 May, Saturday – Tuen of The Festival
- 1 July, Tuesday – Hong Kong Special Administrative Region Establishment Day
- 1 October, Wednesday – National Day
- 7 October, Tuesday – The day following the Chinese Mid-Autumn Festival
- 29 October, Wednesday – Chung Yeung Festival
- 25 December, Thursday – Christmas Day
- 26 December, Friday – The first weekday after Christmas Day

== Arts and entertainment ==
- List of Hong Kong films of 2025
- List of Hong Kong submissions for the Academy Award for Best International Feature Film

== Deaths ==
- 10 January: Shiu Ka-chun, 55, democracy activist, MLC (2016–2020).
- 21 February: Khalil Fong, 41, singer-songwriter.
- 17 March: Lee Shau-kee, 97, business magnate, founder of Henderson Land Development.
- 31 May: Veronica Chan, 102, businesswoman, founder of the Asian Ladies Football Federation.
- 12 June: Charles Ho, 75, businessman, chairman of Sing Tao News Corporation (2001–2021).
- 27 June: Chua Lam, 83, Singaporean-born food critic.
- 3 July: Suet Nei, 79, actress.
- 4 July: Chow Chung, 92, actor.
- 16 July: Taylor Wong, 75, film director (The Truth, With or Without You, The Three Swordsmen).
- 27 July: Henry Hu, 105, academic administrator and politician, founder of HKSYU, MLC (1976–1983) and MUC (1965–1981).
- 28 October: Benz Hui, 76, actor.
- 31 October: Stanley Fung, 81, actor and comedian.
- 4 November: Lam Sheung Mo, 75, actor (Days of Tomorrow).
