= 2023 in Hong Kong =

- Decades: 2000s; 2010s; 2020s
- See also: Other events of 2023; History of Hong Kong • Timeline • Years

Events in the year 2023 in Hong Kong.

== Incumbents ==
Executive branch
Photo	Name	Position	Term
Lee Ka-chiu 20210826	John Lee	Chief Executive	30 June 2022 – present
	Eric Chan	Chief Secretary for Administration	1 July 2022 – present
	Paul Mo-po Chan	Financial Secretary	16 January 2017 – present
	Paul Ting-Kok Lam	Secretary for Justice	1 July 2022 – present

Legislative branch
Photo	Name	Position	Term
	Andrew Leung	President of the Legislative Council	12 October 2016 – present

Judicial branch
Photo	Name	Position	Term
	Andrew Cheung	Chief Justice of the Court of Final Appeal	11 January 2021 – present

=== Executive branch ===
- Chief Executive: John Lee
  - Chief Secretary for Administration: Eric Chan
  - Financial Secretary: Paul Mo-po Chan
  - Secretary for Justice: Teresa Cheng

=== Legislative branch ===
- President of the Legislative Council: Andrew Leung

=== Judicial branch ===
- Chief Justice of the Court of Final Appeal: Andrew Cheung

== Events ==
=== January ===
- 6 January: The largest trial for the national security law against 47 pro-democracy activists begins in Hong Kong two years after their arrest.

=== February ===
- 23 February : All SIM Card users (including old SIM card registered before 1 March 2022) requires real name registration.

=== March ===
- 1 March : The Hong Kong Government lifts all mandatory mask-wearing requirements, and dropped all COVID-19 Restriction Law.

=== April ===
- 26 April – A 23-year-old Hong Kong woman studying in Japan is arrested by Hong Kong police upon returning to the city for allegedly “inciting secession” due to her online posts supporting pro-democracy protests while abroad; she is released on bail, but her passport is confiscated during investigation.

=== May ===
- 2 May : The government propose 2023 Hong Kong electoral changes. Direct elected seats decreased from 452 out of 479 (94%) to 88 out of 470 (19%), and will establish the District Council Eligibility Review Committee for review the eligibility of every District Council Candidates.

=== June ===
- The United States Uyghur Forced Labor Prevention Act goes into effect, restricting imports of Xinjiang goods presumed to be produced with forced labor.

=== July ===
- 3 July : The police reward 1 million Hong Kong Dollars for arrest of 8 people who violate the Hong Kong National Security Law, accusing them of endangering national security and colluding with foreign forces.
- 6 July : The 2023 Hong Kong electoral changes confirmed and approved by Legislative Council.
- 10 July: The final version of 2023 Hong Kong electoral changes officially published and effective.
- The High Court denies a government request to ban the dissemination of the protest anthem Glory to Hong Kong.

=== September ===
- 1 September: Hong Kong raises its typhoon warning signal to level 10, the highest level, as Super Typhoon Saola approaches.
- 7-8 September: After Typhon Haikui makes landfall Hong Kong, flooding reaches record levels, the heaviest since meteorological records began when measured by one hour rainfall. (Recorded 158mm rainfall on Hong Kong Observatory headquarter between 7 September 23:00 and 8 September 00:00).
- 8 September: MTR awards the contract for the design and construction of Kwu Tung station on the MTR Northern Link of the East Rail line to Bouygues.
- 13 September: Hong Kong authorities prosecute Kurt Leung Kui-ming for importing 18 “seditious” pro-democracy books from the United Kingdom, invoking the offense of “importing seditious publications” for the first time under the National Security Law.

=== October ===
- 13 October : The Government published gazette notice to announce 1 April 2024 as the day to implement municipal solid waste (MSW) charging.
- 18 October : Hong Kong Legislative Council passed a bill banning restaurants from providing single-use plastic tableware, tentative effective on 22 April 2024.
- 25 October: Hong Kong Chief Executive John Lee Ka-chiu announces plans to formulate a new local version national security law by implementing basic law article 23 to supplement existing Hong Kong national security law in 2024, making two national security law co-exists together once the new law pass.

=== December ===
- 10 December: The 2023 Hong Kong District Council elections were held.
- 14 December: Hong Kong police announce HK$1 million (US$128,000) bounties for five activists residing overseas, including Simon Cheng, charging them with inciting secession under the national security law.
- 18 December: Jimmy Lai, the 76-year-old founder of the pro-democracy newspaper Apple Daily, begins his Hong Kong national security trial. He faces three charges of “foreign collusion” and one sedition charge under the National Security Law, which carries a potential sentence of life imprisonment.
- 28 December: SMS Sender Registration Scheme will start implement. Under the SMS Registration scheme, SMS sender who have officially registered will have a prefix "#" in the sender IDs, while non-register sender ID will not have prefix "#".

== Arts and entertainment ==
- List of Hong Kong films of 2023
- List of 2023 box office number-one films in Hong Kong
- 47th Hong Kong International Film Festival — 30 March to 10 April 2023
- 16th Asian Film Awards - 12 March 2023
- 41st Hong Kong Film Awards — 16 April 2023
- Ultimate Song Chart Awards Presentation 2022 - 1 January 2023

== Deaths ==
- 3 January – Joseph Koo, composer (b. 1931)
- 11 January – Doming Lam, Macanese-born Hong Kong classical composer (b. 1926)
- 13 January – Ray Cordeiro, broadcaster and disc jockey (b. 1924)
- 21 February – Abby Choi, socialite and model (b. 1994)
- 23 February – José Lei, Olympic sport shooter (1968) and civil servant (b. 1930)
- 26 March – Peter Mak, film director (The Wicked City) and actor (Happy Sixteen, Lai Shi, China's Last Eunuch) (b. 1957)
- 9 April – Richard Ng, actor (The Private Eyes, Winners and Sinners, Beyond the Sunset) (b. 1939)
- 24 June – Sir Ti-liang Yang, jurist, chief justice (1988–1996) (b. 1929)
- 5 July – Coco Lee, Hong Kong-American singer-songwriter (Singer) (b. 1975)
- 18 August – Balltze, Shiba Inu dog and Internet meme (b. 2011)
- 11 December – Kathy Chow, actress (The Breaking Point, Time Before Time, The Heaven Sword and Dragon Saber) (b. 1966)
