= 2021 in Hong Kong =

- Decades: 2000s; 2010s; 2020s
- See also: Other events of 2021; History of Hong Kong • Timeline • Years

Events in the year 2021 in Hong Kong.

== Incumbents ==
=== Executive branch ===
- Chief Executive: Carrie Lam
  - Chief Secretary for Administration: Matthew Cheung
  - Financial Secretary: Paul Mo-po Chan
  - Secretary for Justice: Teresa Cheng

=== Legislative branch ===
- President of the Legislative Council: Andrew Leung

=== Judicial branch ===
- Chief Justice of the Court of Final Appeal: Andrew Cheung

== Events ==
=== January ===
- 1 January - The Hong Kong Observatory recorded the low temperature of 8.6°C, lowest recorded on New Years Day since 2005.
- 6 January - The police arrested over 50 people who have openly addressed their support towards democratic movements in Hong Kong. They are said to have offended the National Security Law.
- 11 January - Chief Justice of the Court of Final Appeal Geoffrey Ma resigned and Justice Andrew Cheung took his place.
- 15 January:
  - The government issued a COVID-19 test mandate for buildings within the area of Jordan Road, Nathan Road, Kansu Street and Canton Road.
  - Hong Kong Civil Service Bureau issued a circular to all policy bureaus and departments, promulgating the requirement for civil servants requires to take an oath or sign a declaration.
- 16 January - The U.S. Treasury announced sanctions against 6 pro-Beijing politicians in accordance to Hong Kong situations.
- 19 January - The government announced that the unemployment rate reached 6.6%, highest in 16 years, with around 246,000 currently unemployed.
- 26 January - 180th anniversary of the opening of Hong Kong
- 31 January - Holders of British National (Overseas) in Hong Kong will be eligible for UK residence visas for themselves and their immediate family members, for either a period of 30 months (renewable once for a further 30 months) or five years.

=== February ===
- 9 February - The Office of the Communications Authority announced that six digital television channels will transit to new frequencies from 1 December to support telecommunication services.

=== March ===
- 11 March - China's National People's Congress passed the "decision on improving the electoral system of Hong Kong", which will rewrite the election rules in Hong Kong to ensure a system of "patriots governing Hong Kong". This is seen by many Western countries as further eroding the freedoms of the Hong Kong people.
- 30 March - The National People's Congress Standing Committee (NPCSC) amended the Annex I and Annex II of the Basic Law of Hong Kong, the compositions of the Election Committee (EC), which is responsible for electing the Chief Executive, and the Legislative Council were drastically revamped. The size of the Election Committee would be increased from 1,200 to 1,500 seats with a sizeable number of new seats would be nominated and elected by the government-appointed and Beijing-controlled organisations. The Legislative Council from 70 to 90 seats where the currently half of the 70 seats which were directly elected would be shrunk to 20 seats with extra 40 seats elected by the Election Committee.

=== April ===
- 1 April - As part of a transition to new frequencies, six television channels broadcast on existing and new frequencies for the next six months.

=== May ===
- 21 May - Hong Kong Government announce that Non-Civil Contract Staff requires take oath.
- 27 May - 2021 Hong Kong electoral changes: The Improving Electoral System (Consolidated Amendments) Bill 2021 passed by Legislative Council.

=== June ===
- 23 June - The pro-democracy tabloid Apple Daily announces that its final edition will be released on Thursday and that it will later cease activities after five top executives were arrested under the national security law and the tabloid's assets were frozen. Apple Daily founder Jimmy Lai is already imprisoned and awaits trial, along with 46 others, on subversion charges.
- 27 June - MTR Tuen Ma Line Opens.

=== July ===
- 15 July - MTR announces that Arup will design the first phase of the MTR Northern Link of the East Rail line.
- 16 July - The Small Unmanned Aircraft Order (SUA Order) gazetted. It requires small unmanned aircraft (including small unmanned aerial photography aircraft) over 200 gram and remote pilots proceeds officially registration. Remote pilots who drive over 7 kg unmanned aircraft (including aerial photography aircraft) need to take training and pass the formal assessment accepted by the government. The ordinance are expected take effect on 1 June 2022 and the regulation requirement will enforce after 30 November 2022.
- 19 July - Tsuen Wan waterfront cycle track fully opens.

=== September ===
- 1 Sep :
  - The Open University of Hong Kong officially rename to Hong Kong Metropolitan University.
  - The Telecommunications (Registration of SIM Cards) Regulation take effect. New Subscriber Identification Module (SIM Card) require real-name registration on or after 1 March 2022. Existing SIM Card require real-name registration by February 23, 2023.

=== December ===
- December 19 - The 2021 Hong Kong legislative election, originally scheduled for 6 September 2020 but postponed due to the COVID-19 pandemic, was held.
- December 29 - The Hong Kong Police arrested Stand News senior staff. Stand News officially announced shut down after senior staff being arrested.

== Deaths ==
- 4 January - Lee Heung-Kam, actress (b. 1932)
- 27 February - Ng Man-tat, actor (b. 1950)
- 28 March - Liu Kai-chi, actor (b. 1954)

== Arts and entertainment ==
- List of Hong Kong films of 2021
- 2021 Metro Radio Music Awards - 27 December 2021
