= Bonham Strand (tailor) =

Hong Kong suit brand

- Type: Private
- Industry: Tailoring
- Founded: 2012
- Headquarters: Sheung Wan, Hong Kong
- Area served: Kowloon and Hong Kong Island
- Products: Clothing, Fashion, Tailored Suits
- Owner: RGL Holdings, Ltd.
- Website: https://bonhamstrand.hk/

Bonham Strand is a brand of bespoke tailored suits based in Hong Kong.

== History ==
Bonham Strand was founded in Hong Kong in April 2012. It was named Bonham Strand as the company headquarters are located in Bonham Strand, Sheung Wan in Hong Kong.

== Overview ==
Bonham Strand has a partnership with established Italian fabrics provider Cerruti. The company emphasizes that all suits are made in Hong Kong. The tailors are local and the company has a social aspect by hiring rehabilitated drug addicts to become apprentices.

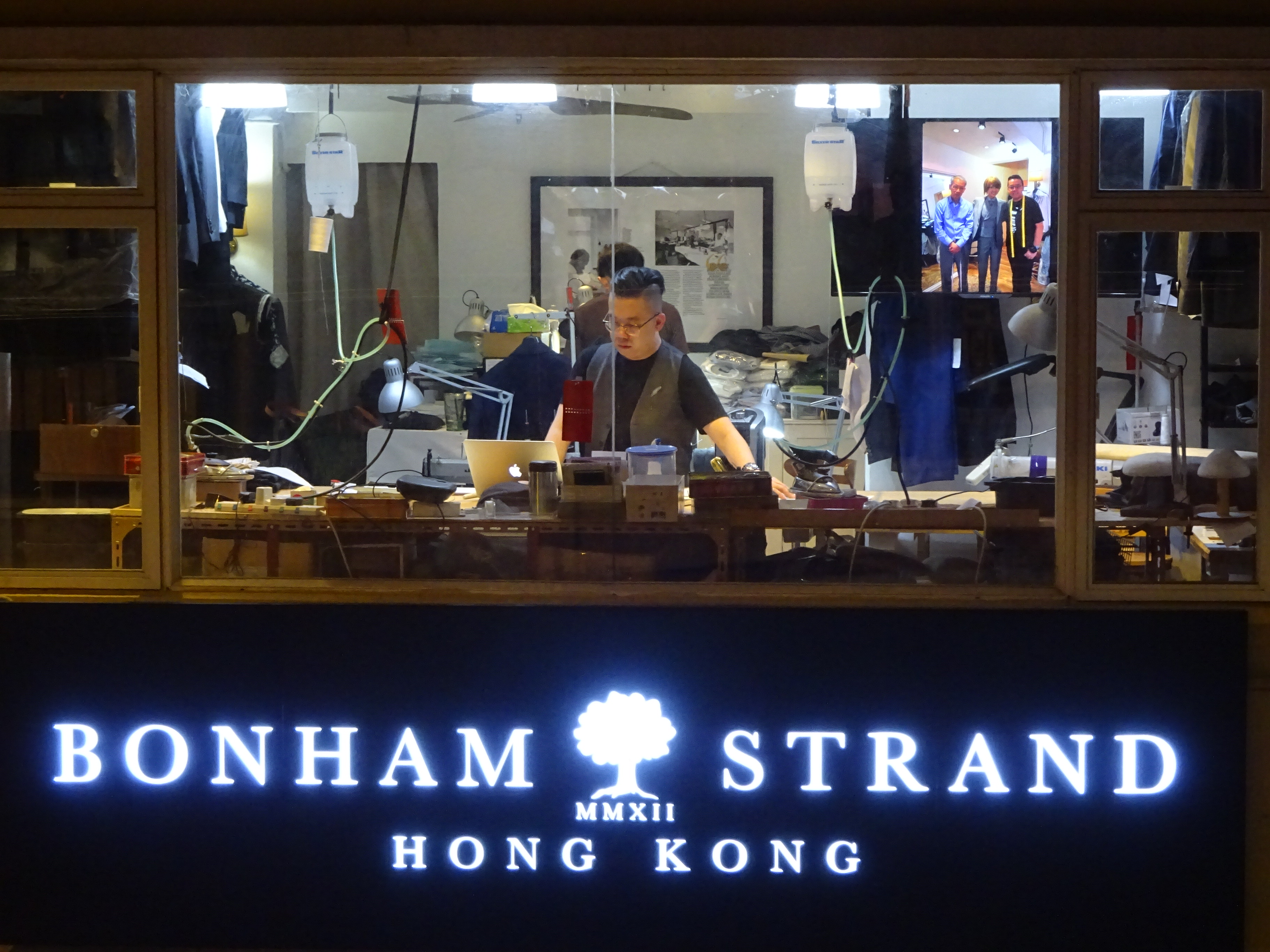
Tailors working at a Bonham Strand workshop on Hollywood Road in Central

Besides reaching out to corporate sponsors, Bonham Strand is the first tailor to reach out to the Hong Kong Government for support to help revive the tailoring industry in Hong Kong as well as helping with unemployed youths.
