= Wong Lam =

Wong Lam OBE, JP
- 王霖

Unofficial Member of the Legislative Council of Hong Kong
- In office 6 October 1976 – 7 August 1985
- Appointed by: Sir Murray MacLehose

Personal details
- Born: 23 July 1919 British Hong Kong
- Died: 19 March 2016 (aged 96) Hong Kong
- Education: Ellis Kadoorie School

Wong Lam, OBE, JP (Chinese: 王霖; 23 July 1919 – 19 March 2016) was an Unofficial member of the Legislative Council of Hong Kong from 1976 to 1985. He was the first member from a grass-roots background to serve on the Council and the first to speak in exclusively in Cantonese during the legislature debates.

== Early life and career ==
Wong was born in Hong Kong in 1919 and was educated at the Ellis Kadoorie School. At the age of 15, he moved to Guangzhou to continue his studies and remained there until the outbreak of the Second Sino-Japanese War in 1937, returning to Hong Kong that year to join the Kowloon Motor Bus as a conductor. In 1966, he was promoted to operations officer of the Kwun Tong Depot, established to open up new routes to the new satellite town then dominated by mini-buses. His role required he make contact with kaifong associations, the Secretariat for Chinese Affairs, the Social Welfare Department and the police and thus he got to know many government officials, including Denis Bray who later became the Secretary for Home Affairs. He was asked for advice on the transportation issues in Kwun Tong and was invited to see Governor Sir Murray MacLehose. He also became the public relations manager for Kowloon Motor Bus.

Wong had also been chairman of the Mutual Aid Committee of the Wing Ying Mansion in Ho Man Tin and was appointed vice-chairman of the Kwun Tong Industrial Area Committee. In 1973, he became member of the Mong Kok East Area Committee. He was also appointed by the government to the Fight Crime Committee in 1973 as one of the three unofficial members, and chairman of the Kwun Tong Road Safety Campaign Committee in 1974. In 1976, he was made Justice of the Peace.

== Legislative Councillor ==
Wong was appointed Unofficial member of the Legislative Council of Hong Kong when Sir Murray MacLehose expanded the Unofficial membership from 15 to 23 in 1976. He became the first with grassroots background to serve on the Legislative Council, along with labour representative Leung Tat-shing and church representative Rev. Patrick Terence McGovern. Unable to speak English, he was the first to be allowed to speak exclusively in Cantonese in Legislative Council debate (the first to use Cantonese in the Legislative Council was Sir Sze-yuen Chung) and the first to receive an allowance for buying suits and hiring assistants. During his service in the council, Wong mainly focused on transport and housing problems. He stepped down when the government introduced indirect elections in 1985. In 1978, he was made Officer of the Order of the British Empire (OBE) for his public services.

In debate on the famous Lobo motion on the Sino-British negotiations on the Hong Kong sovereignty in 1984, Wong spoke in support and advised the government to "remove the confidentiality of the Sino-British talks imposed at present ... What we should be after is not just the superficial elements pertaining to the status quo, but rather the retention of the underlying concept. For example, speculation in stocks and shares is not important on the fact(sic) of it, what is important is the underlying concept, i.e. the freedom to raise capital and carry on transactions."

== Later years and death ==
Wong was instrumental in assisting the development of education in his hometown Dongguan. He helped in the founding of the Dongguan University of Technology in 1992. In 1990, he was made a member of the Dongguan Chinese People's Political Consultative Conference. In 1996, he was made an honorary citizen of Donggaun.

Wong's last public appearance was in December 2015 when he was invited to a banquet at the Legislative Council Complex with incumbent and former Legislative Councillors. He died on 19 March 2016 at the age of 96.
