= Disappearance of Simon Cheng =

2019 unlawful detention case

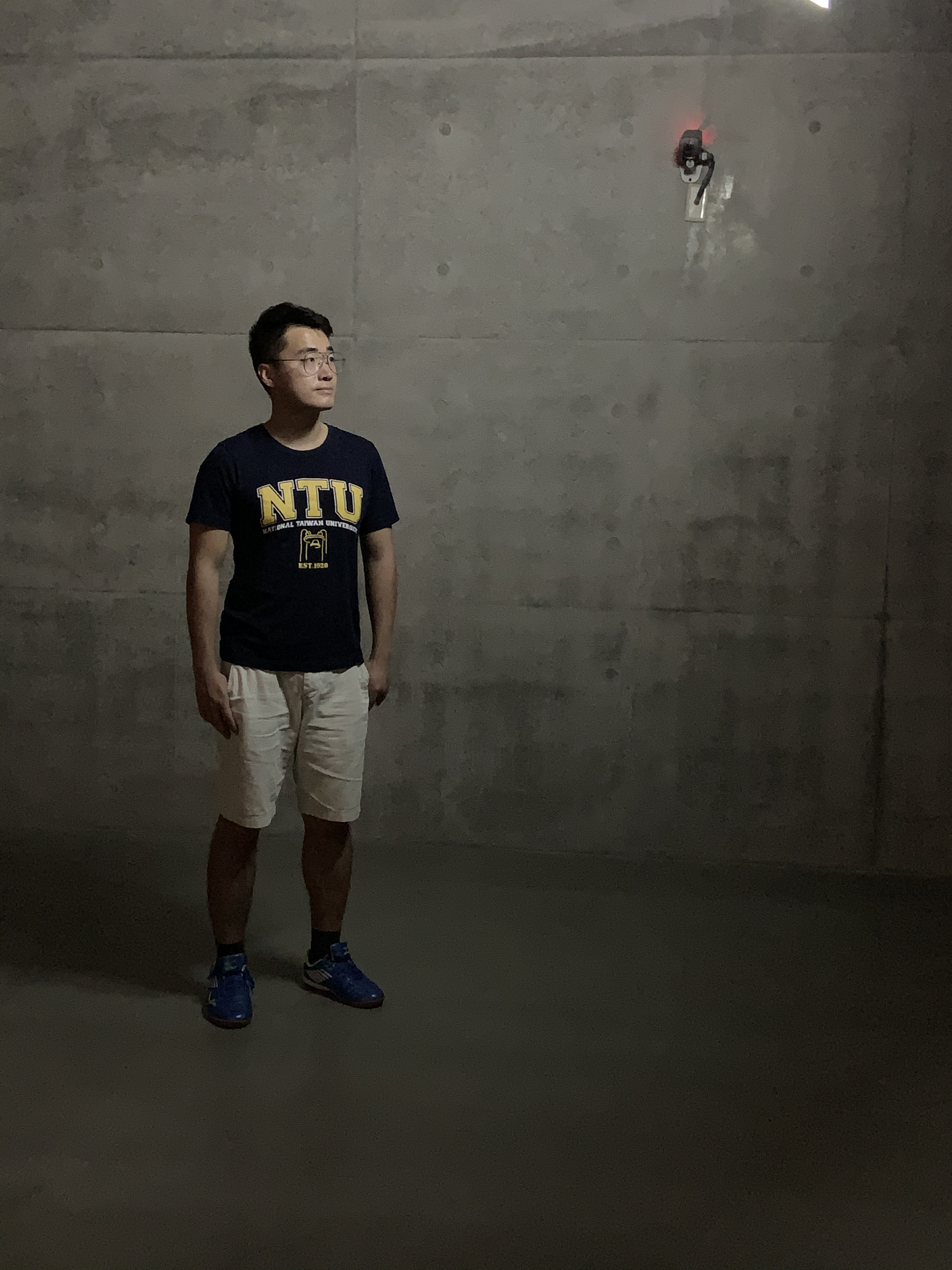
Schematic diagram of Simon Cheng's confinement

Simon Cheng, an employee of the British Consulate General in Hong Kong, was administratively detained by the mainland Chinese police at the Hong Kong West Kowloon High Speed Rail Station on August 8, 2019, and claimed to have been forced to disappear. Because the incident occurred during the anti-extradition bill movement and because of Cheng's special identity, it attracted widespread attention from both China and Hong Kong. Later, the Luohu Branch of the Shenzhen Public Security Bureau of the Chinese police issued a situation report on the Chinese social media "Weibo" on August 26, 2019, regarding his claim of disappearance in the mainland, stating that Cheng violated the Public Security Administration Punishment Law in Shenzhen and "engaged in prostitution many times", and sentenced him to administrative detention for 15 days. He was released as scheduled on August 24.

Simon Cheng did not make a public appearance at the beginning of his release. On November 20, 2019, he released a full statement about his disappearance, For the Record: An Enemy of the State, and accepted interviews with the Wall Street Journal, the Daily Telegraph and the BBC, claiming that he was tortured by the "National Security" personnel of the Chinese secret police during his detention, and was asked to explain the role of the UK in the anti-amendment protests in Hong Kong, and confessed to "prostitution" and "betraying the motherland" under coercion. According to Simon Cheng, he was taken away by compulsory measures during border inspection at the mainland port area of the Hong Kong West Kowloon High-Speed Railway Station.

On July 1, 2020, Simon Cheng held an online press conference, stating that he was the first Hong Kong citizen (Hong Kong resident) and British National Overseas Passport (BNO) holder to be granted political asylum by the British authorities, and can stay in the UK for 5 years, and then apply for permanent residence and British citizenship.

== Background ==
Simon Cheng (1990-), a Hong Kong resident, lived in Tuen Mun, Hong Kong until he graduated from high school. From 2010 to 2014, Simon Cheng studied at the Department of Political Science, International Relations, National Taiwan University. During his studies, he was a short-term exchange student at Peking University and the University of Tokyo.

After graduating from National Taiwan University, Simon Cheng studied for a master's degree in European political economy at the London School of Economics and Political Science and graduated in 2017. During this period, he took the elective course "Chinese Government and Politics".

At the end of 2017, Simon Cheng returned to Hong Kong and became an employee of the Scottish International Development Agency of the British Consulate General in Hong Kong. Later, due to his disappearance in August 2019, he was accused of soliciting prostitution and questioned by the Chinese police. The British government regarded him as a security risk and asked him to resign.

== Disappearance ==
At 12 noon on August 8, 2019, Simon Cheng left his home in Jordan, Hong Kong and entered Shenzhen, Guangdong Province to attend a business meeting that day. At 18:00 on the evening of August 8, Simon Cheng entered the club and left at 21:00. At 22:00, Simon Cheng sent a WeChat message to his girlfriend claiming that he was taking the high-speed rail back, and then lost contact with his family. When Simon Cheng was interviewed by the BBC later, he claimed that he was stopped during the border inspection at the mainland port area of West Kowloon Station, and was sent on a train to Shenzhen and handed over to three plainclothes police officers from the Chinese National Security Department.

On August 9, Shenzhen Luohu police said that "Hong Kong resident Simon Cheng was sentenced to 15 days of administrative detention by Luohu police for violating Article 66 of the "Public Security Administration Punishment Law of the People's Republic of China" (i.e. prostitution).

On August 10, Simon Cheng's family said that the Hong Kong Immigration Department stated that the person was administratively detained in mainland China, and the reason and location of the detention were unknown.

On August 21, the Chinese Ministry of Foreign Affairs held a regular press conference. Spokesperson Geng Shuang stated that Simon Cheng was sentenced to 15 days of administrative detention by Shenzhen police for violating the "Public Security Administration Punishment Law of the People's Republic of China". When reporters asked about the specific case, Geng Shuang said "It is recommended to inquire with the relevant departments." On the same day, a Facebook page named "Release Simon Cheng" uploaded a statement signed by "Simon's Family" yesterday, saying: "After verification by lawyers, the case is under the charge of the Shenzhen Public Security Bureau, but it has not been found out where Simon is being held, and he has not been able to meet with a lawyer. There is no trace of Simon in the Shenzhen Detention Center, Bao'an District Detention Center, and Nanshan District Detention Center. Two police stations in Guangzhou and Shenzhen, as well as the Guangzhou Railway Public Security Bureau, all said they did not know Simon's whereabouts. "The family feels helpless and is very worried about Simon's safety. They hope that Simon can return to Hong Kong as soon as possible."

On August 22, the Luohu police in Shenzhen, Guangdong Province announced that Hong Kong resident Zheng Moujie was sentenced to 15 days of administrative detention by the Luohu police on August 9 for violating Article 66 of the "Public Security Administration Punishment Law of the People's Republic of China" (i.e. prostitution). The family of Zheng was not informed of this because "it was requested by Zheng himself". Zheng Wenjie denied this statement in a public statement on November 20, 2019.

On August 24, the Luohu Branch of the Shenzhen Public Security Bureau stated on Weibo that Zheng Wenjie had been released after the expiration of the administrative detention. During the administrative detention, the public security organs protected Zheng Wenjie's various legal rights and interests in accordance with the law, and stated that Zheng Wenjie confessed to his illegal facts. On the same day, the Facebook page "Release Simon Cheng" said that Cheng Wenjie has returned to Hong Kong. He and his family hope to rest and settle down first. He will not accept interviews for the time being and thank the outside world for their concern. The page was closed on the 26th.

The Apple Daily reported that judging from the CCTV footage, the massage place involved is the "Lishui Yunjian Leisure Club", a long-established massage shop located on Dongmen Middle Road, Luohu District, Shenzhen, which is frequented by many Hong Kong people. It is still operating normally after the incident.

== Torture claims ==
On August 22, after the Luohu police announced the reasons for his detention, Zheng Wenjie's family said they would not respond to the report, saying that "justice is in the hearts of the people." On August 23, Zheng Wenjie's family's Facebook account posted a message saying: "Prostitution is a fabricated charge. Everyone should think this is a joke." On the same day, Geng Shuang said at a press conference that this incident was not a diplomatic issue, but an ordinary public security case.

On September 9, Zheng Wenjie posted on Facebook: "Pray for Hong Kong! Come on Hong Kong!"

On November 20, the BBC broadcast a video of Zheng Wenjie's interview. In the video, Zheng Wenjie said that he was tortured during his detention in Shenzhen, and the torturer claimed to be a national security staff member. Zheng Wenjie was shackled, blindfolded, hooded, handcuffed to an X-shaped frame, and forced to squat for several hours. If he moved slightly, he would be beaten on vulnerable parts of the body such as ankles and joints. In addition, he was sleep deprived and forced to sing the national anthem of the People's Republic of China to stay awake. Cheng Wenjie also said that during his detention, he saw a group of Hong Kong people being arrested and interrogated. The interrogators also tied him to a chair, pulled his hair, forced him to use facial unlock to open his phone, and looked through his communication records with British officials. After getting nothing, the Chinese government asked him to record two video confessions. He said one was about "betraying the motherland" and the other was about "prostitution." At the end of the video, the host asked Cheng Wenjie if he had solicited prostitution. Cheng Wenjie did not answer directly, but said "I don't want to focus on whether I have solicited prostitution... because that is exactly what they (the mainland government) want" and "I have not done anything to let down the people I cherish and love." Cheng Wenjie's written statement also mentioned that he denied all the arbitrary accusations made by the authorities through illegal procedures (including torture, threats and coercion) to collect evidence. In the interview, he also revealed that "the British Consulate instructed staff to collect information and information about the demonstrations." As a "supporter of the democratic movement," Cheng joined some social groups where demonstrators coordinated their actions with the consent of the consulate and began to report what he saw to his colleagues. The consulate also paid him overtime. Cheng Wenjie and British government sources insisted that his job was not to direct events in any way, but to observe purely - just like the civil society observation work done by many embassies.

When he entered the interrogation room, there were 17 to 20 police officers, half of whom were plainclothes officers. Cheng estimated that they were secret police who specialized in handling political persecution cases. He changed his confession to prostitution because he wanted to get out as soon as possible. During the interrogation, the national security showed him photos of Lennon Wall, which made him suspect that the Chinese Communist Party (CCP) had informants working in Hong Kong and even mixed in with the Hong Kong police. Some of the national security officers who questioned him spoke fluent Cantonese, and Cheng suspected that there were Hong Kong police working in the mainland. He has returned to the UK to seek protection from the local government, hoping to use his experience to arouse the attention of the international community to the missing Hong Kong people.

=== Surveillance and interrogation videos ===
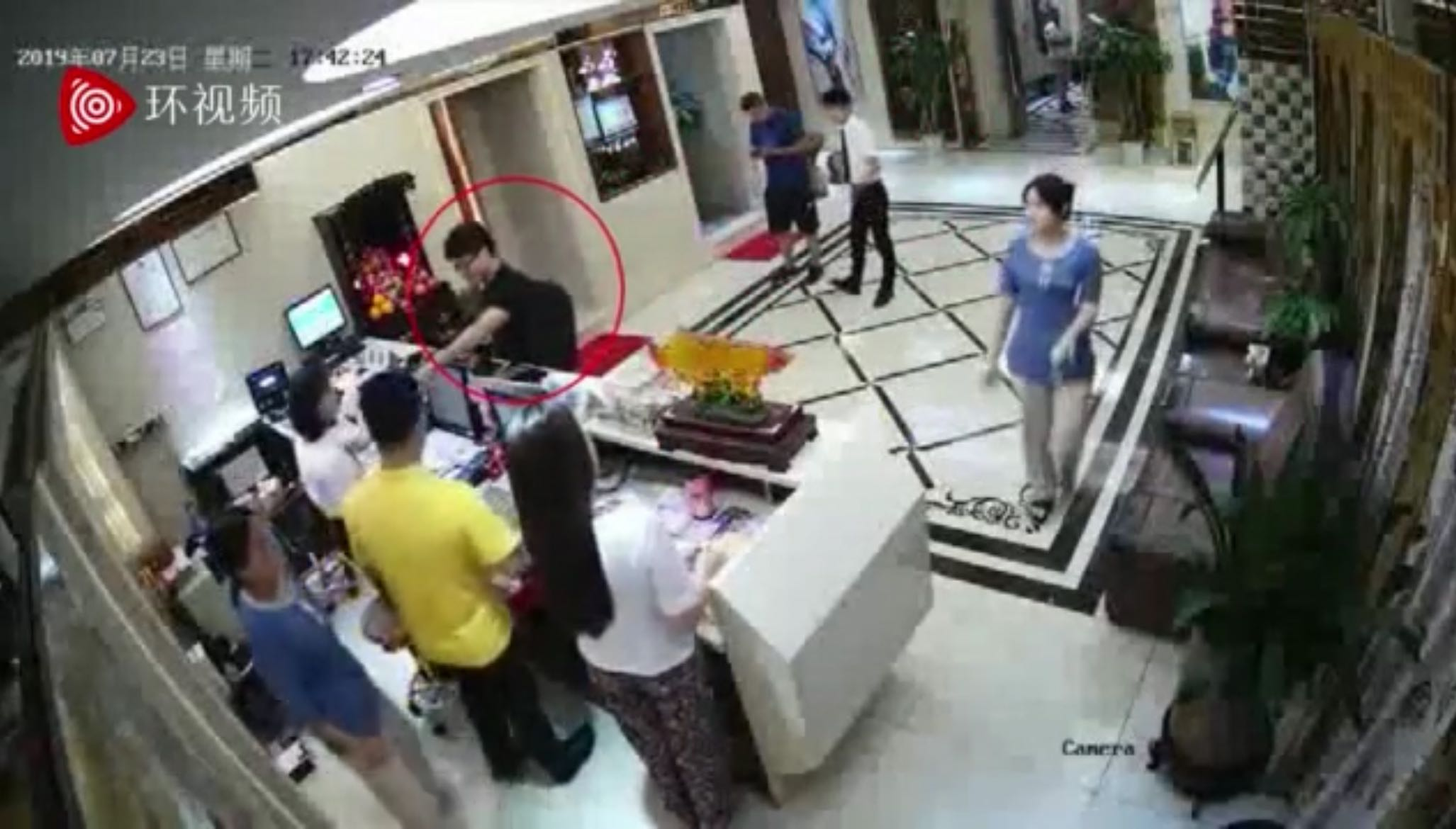
At 17:42 on July 23, 2019, Zheng Wenjie entered the club

On November 21, a reporter from Chinese Communist Party tabloid Global Times released two videos obtained from the Luohu police in Shenzhen. The first video showed that Zheng Wenjie entered and exited a club in Shenzhen three times on the evenings of July 23, July 31, and August 8, 2019.

Date	Time of entering the club	Time of entering the room	Time of leaving the club
July 23, 2019	17:42	17:58	20:18
July 31, 2019	18:21	18:34	20:43
August 8, 2019	18:42	18:54	21:03

The second video shows the police asking Zheng Wenjie why he had the right to notify his family but did not. In the video, Zheng is wearing a pink prison uniform with "Luo Ju XXI" marked on the right chest and "915" on the abdomen. Zheng Wenjie said that he was "not very comfortable telling his family about this" and "felt guilty and regretful" and "was too ashamed to see his girlfriend and family". China's official media Global Times said that his expression was "natural" and different from the abuse he described in November. The Global Times said that the police showed reporters another video in which two women confessed that they provided illegal sexual services to Zheng Wenjie at his request. The report published a screenshot of the video and quoted a woman's statement that "he said if I did it for him, he could give me more tips."

The report said that the police said that their interrogation and detention in this case were in accordance with the law and regulations, and there was no torture at all. When Zheng was released on August 24, "the doctor stationed at the detention center conducted a comprehensive physical examination of his body and he was in good health."

== Follow-up ==
On November 22, the Daily Telegraph reported that "Cheng Wenjie will be granted a British visa"; and the BBC reported on the 20th that Cheng Wenjie had obtained a two-year work visa in the UK.

On November 29, some citizens initiated a rally outside the British Consulate General in Hong Kong in Admiralty at 7:30 pm to support Cheng Wenjie. Many people wore Cheng Wenjie's masks and held banners to support Cheng Wenjie, and some raised the British flag. The British Deputy Consul General in Hong Kong later went outside the door to receive the petition letter, and the initiator announced the end of the rally.

On November 29, Cheng Wenjie complained to the British Communications Authority (Ofcom) about China Global Television Network (CGTN, also known as China Global Television Network), saying that the TV station broadcast a video of his forced confession in the UK. Cheng denied the allegation, saying he was forced to confess to prostitution and that Chinese police were actually interrogating him about Britain's role in the Hong Kong democracy protests. Cheng said he was held in solitary confinement in a secret location and tortured, and the confession video was recorded after that, and the televised confession was not voluntary. The segment was broadcast on November 21, attempting to mislead viewers, and Cheng "has admitted to breaking the law." On February 5, 2021, the British Communications Authority (Ofcom) revoked the broadcasting license of China Global Television Network, and a few weeks later fined it 225,000 pounds, partly because the TV network was affiliated with the Chinese Communist Party and violated fairness, privacy and impartiality provisions, violating British broadcasting law. "We found that the individual concerned was unfairly paid and his personal privacy was unwarrantedly violated," the British Communications Authority said, adding that "the facts and evidence pointed to the broadcaster (CGTN) as casting serious doubts on the reliability of its alleged confession." The program played the pre-trial "confessions" of the two people during the prosecution. The British Communications Authority said it was considering further sanctions.

On January 10, 2020, Cheng Wenjie posted on Facebook that he had severed ties with his family members in Hong Kong and mainland China to prevent them from being harassed.

On June 14, 2020, in a video interview released by the BBC, he revealed that he had been entrusted by the British Consulate in Hong Kong to collect news, online public information, and information from protesters during the anti-extradition movement. The BBC host expressed doubts about Zheng's participation in the anti-extradition movement while employed, and his behavior was undoubtedly like a spy. The host also said bluntly: "Were you monitoring at the time, Mr. Zheng?" Zheng was slightly panicked and immediately replied: "My... I mean, I have several different identities. One of them is my workplace identity. As an employee of the British Consulate in Hong Kong, this job has nothing to do with politics. But at the same time, my daily identity is a Hong Kong citizen (Hong Kong citizen). It is clearly stated in the employee code that as a Hong Kong citizen, I have the freedom and right to participate in rallies and protests in Hong Kong."

On July 1, 2020, Cheng Wenjie held an online press conference and said that he applied for political asylum from the British Home Office at the end of last year, and the application was approved on June 26. Cheng Wenjie is the first Hong Kong resident and British National (Overseas) (BNO) passport holder to be granted political asylum.

== Responses ==
=== People's Republic of China ===
On August 21, 2019, the Luohu police in Shenzhen reported that "On August 9, Hong Kong resident Zheng Moujie was sentenced to 15 days of administrative detention by the Luohu police for violating Article 66 of the "Public Security Administration Punishment Law of the People's Republic of China."

On August 20, Chinese Foreign Ministry spokesman Geng Shuang said at a press conference that he did not have relevant information. At the regular press conference held on August 21, 2019, when Chinese Foreign Ministry spokesman Geng Shuang was asked about the suspected detention of an employee of the British Consulate General in Hong Kong in the mainland, Geng Shuang said, "This is not a diplomatic issue. According to what I have learned so far, this person was punished with 15 days of administrative detention by the Shenzhen police for violating the "Public Security Administration Punishment Law of the People's Republic of China." Geng Shuang said in other related questions, "Regarding the recent series of words and deeds of the British side on Hong Kong-related issues, we have made solemn representations to the British side many times, demanding that the British side stop making irresponsible remarks, stop interfering in Hong Kong affairs, stop interfering in China's internal affairs, and stop making irresponsible remarks. The British side is very clear about this."

On November 21, 2019, the Chinese police responded to the "Complete Statement on the Disappearance of Zheng Wenjie For the Record: An Enemy of the State" released on November 20 and the accusation that the police violated human rights by not notifying Zheng Wenjie's family and lawyers during his detention, saying that "there was no torture." Shenzhen Public Security Bureau released two videos through the media. The first video is a surveillance video showing Zheng Wenjie entering the club room and leaving the club three times with different women at different times in Lishui Yunjian Leisure Club, Luohu, Shenzhen. The second video is a video of the police interrogation after detention. The content shows Zheng's confession and repentance for soliciting prostitution. The second video shows that when the police asked Zheng why he refused to notify his family when he was arrested by the public security organs, they told him that he had the right to notify his family. Zheng said in the video, "Because I feel embarrassed about this matter, I am not too embarrassed to tell my family about it, so I chose not to notify my family." This is inconsistent with the media's doubts that the police violated human rights. The video also shows two women confessing that they provided illegal sexual services to Zheng Wenjie at his request.

=== Hong Kong ===
On August 21, the Hong Kong police held a press conference. When asked about the incident involving Cheng Wenjie, Senior Superintendent (Media Liaison and Communications) of the Police Public Relations Branch, Jiang Yongxiang, said that the police investigation found that Cheng Wenjie left the country at noon on August 8 via the Luohu Port and had no record of returning to Hong Kong afterwards. The Police Liaison Branch had asked the mainland Chinese department about his whereabouts, but received no response. It was pointed out that the Hong Kong police and the mainland Chinese public security have a mutual notification mechanism, but administrative detention is not included in the mechanism, so the police did not receive any notification from mainland China.

=== United Kingdom ===
On November 21, 2019, British Foreign Secretary Dominic Raab summoned the Chinese ambassador to the UK and expressed his "anger at the disgraceful abuse" suffered by Cheng Wenjie during his detention by the mainland Chinese police, and expected the Chinese government to track down and hold accountable those responsible.

At 11:00 am on the same day, the British Embassy in China released a statement on Sina Weibo when British Foreign Secretary Dominic Raab summoned the Chinese ambassador to the UK:

We are shocked and horrified that Simon Cheng, a valued member of our team, has been mistreated and tortured while in detention in China. I have summoned the Chinese ambassador to the UK to express our outrage at the cruel and shameful treatment of Simon Cheng. This practice violates China's obligations in the international community. I have made it clear that we hope China will investigate this and hold those responsible accountable. The UK Foreign and Commonwealth Office is assisting Simon Cheng and his fiancée, including facilitating their travel to the UK. - British Foreign Secretary Dominic Raab

After the release of the two videos provided by the Shenzhen police, the statement on the Weibo account of the British Embassy in China was suspected to be deleted. On the 22nd, the British Embassy in China said that it did not take the initiative to delete this Weibo, and its account homepage can still be displayed. In addition, on the website of the British Foreign Office, the webpage where the British Foreign Secretary spoke about the Zheng Wenjie incident was not deleted, and there were bilingual versions in Chinese and English.

On January 2, 2020, Reuters quoted five sources as saying that due to the tension between China and Britain, China has temporarily called off the "Shanghai-London Stock Connect" plan. The five sources from public office and investment banks have communicated with Chinese officials on the "Shanghai-London Stock Connect" plan. Two of them particularly emphasized the UK's position on the Hong Kong demonstrations, and one person mentioned the UK's comments on the arrest of a former employee of the British Consulate in Hong Kong (Zheng Wenjie).

=== Canada ===
On August 23, according to Reuters, the Canadian Consulate General in Hong Kong has suspended the travel of Hong Kong employees to mainland China. Geng Shuang responded at the regular press conference of the Ministry of Foreign Affairs with "Gentlemen are open and honest, while villains are always worried."

== Commentary ==
On August 23, Hong Kong current affairs commentator Liu Ruishao pointed out that Sino-British relations are at a sensitive period, which makes people wonder whether the whole thing is not as simple as the official claims. Is there a more complicated factor behind it, such as China putting pressure on the UK?

On November 21, the Global Times published an editorial titled "Prostitutes become political victims, this is so creative", satirizing Zheng Wenjie and the BBC, saying that "a person with serious moral flaws and whose stories cannot stand scrutiny at all is supported by the British media and government at full speed. Whatever he says is true. This is the most interesting part of the Zheng Wenjie incident."

Hong Kong Secretary for Justice Teresa Cheng said in an interview in London that she did not want to make any comments before all the facts emerged.

After the British Embassy in China's statement condemning China on Sina Weibo disappeared, other Weibo posts received many comments from mainland Chinese netizens, such as "Where is this Weibo? Why was it deleted?", "The prostitute is an important member of your team?", "The prince is guilty of prostitution like the common people", etc., with a total of more than 16,000 messages.

On November 22, 2019, the British Broadcasting Corporation quoted netizens' comments saying that there were many doubts. For example, the place shown in the surveillance video was more like a massage and bathing club, which could not directly prove that Zheng Wenjie participated in prostitution. In addition, there were unusual scenes of couples bringing children into the "club". Some netizens also questioned that prostitution was caught on the spot. They would not be investigated after the incident. They also questioned how the police knew what Zheng Wenjie did in the room.

Apple Daily reported that "the club "Lishui Yunjian" visited by Zheng Wenjie was not mentioned in the pornographic forums in the mainland, and the reporter's investigation did not find that "Lishui Yunjian" provided adult services.""It is believed that "Lishui Yunjian" is just an ordinary place." Global Times reported that the police provided two videos to the Global Times. The first video showed Zheng Wenjie entering the club room and leaving with different women at three different times in a club in Luohu, Shenzhen, and his own confession of prostitution in front of the camera. The police said that they investigated the relevant places based on Zheng Wenjie's confession and found that Zheng Wenjie went to the same place to solicit prostitution on July 23, July 31 and August 8.

== See also ==
- Wang Liqiang incident
- The relationship between Chinese dissidents and those accused of soliciting prostitution
- The loyal doctor in national crisis

== Notes ==
1. Article 66 of the "Public Security Administration Punishment Law of the People's Republic of China" stipulates that those who engage in prostitution or solicit prostitution shall be detained for not less than 10 days but not more than 15 days, and may be fined not more than 5,000 yuan; if the circumstances are minor, they shall be detained for not more than 5 days or fined not more than 500 yuan. Those who solicit prostitution in public places shall be detained for not more than 5 days or fined not more than 500 yuan.
2. Article 55 of the Provisions on the Handling of Administrative Cases by Public Security Organs: (V) When implementing administrative compulsory measures that restrict the personal freedom of citizens, the family members of the party concerned shall be informed on the spot of the public security organ implementing the compulsory measures, the reasons, the location and the duration; if it is impossible to inform on the spot, the family members shall be informed immediately by telephone, text message, fax, etc. after the implementation of the compulsory measures; if the identity is unknown, the family members are refused to provide contact information, or it is impossible to notify due to force majeure such as natural disasters, no notification may be made. The circumstances of informing or notifying the family members or the reasons for not being able to notify the family members shall be noted in the interrogation record.
3. Article 176 of the Provisions on the Handling of Administrative Cases by Public Security Organs: When a decision on administrative detention is made, the family of the person being punished shall be notified promptly of the punishment and the place of execution or the situation of non-execution in accordance with the law. ... If the person being punished refuses to provide contact information for his family or does not give his real name and address, and his identity is unknown, he may not be notified, but this shall be noted in the decision attached to the file.
