= 2011 Fa Yuen Street fire =

Fire in Hong Kong

Coordinates: 22.3215°N 114.1706°E

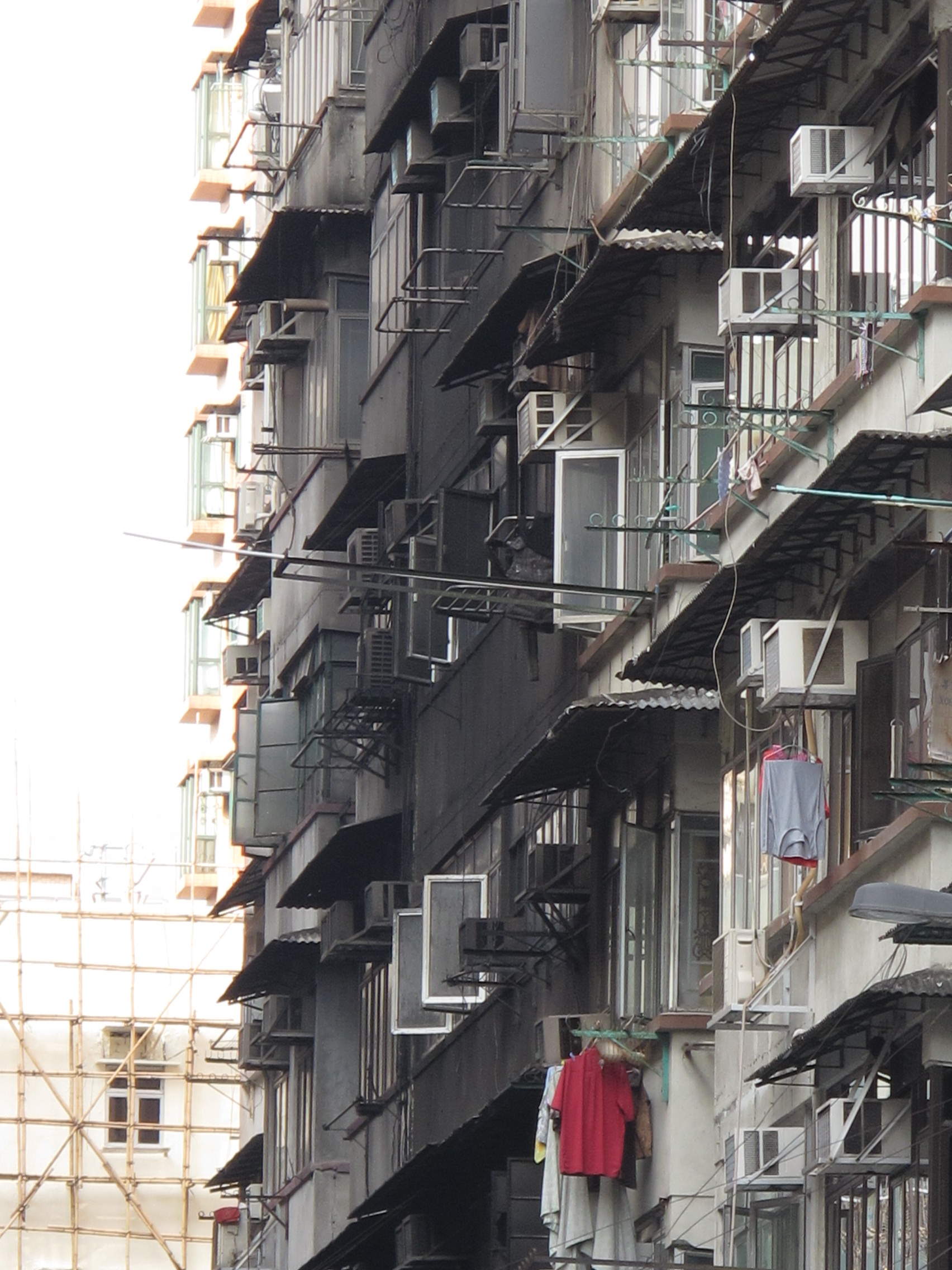
Blackened wall of the building engulfed in the fire

The 2011 Fa Yuen street fire (Chinese: 2011年花園街排檔大火) occurred in Fa Yuen Street, Mongkok, Hong Kong on 30 November 2011 in one of the most densely populated area. The fire killed 9 people and injured 34 others, making it the deadliest fire in Hong Kong in 14 years. It had taken place around the same time as the Hong Kong Fire Services Department's 48-hour protest.

== Fire incident ==
The fire broke out in Mongkok Fa Yuen Street between 188 and 198 at the Pai dong areas. The fire killed 9 people and injured 34. About 118 people became homeless after the fire. A total of 44 fire appliances and 210 firefighters were sent to tackle the blaze, with 26 ambulances called. Chief Secretary for Administration Stephen Lam had later been put in charge of handling the case.

== Fire department 48-hour protest ==
The Hong Kong Fire Services Department have long protested for having to work far too many hours. Thousands of firefighters held a protest at Southorn Playground after the fire. According to the department's statement, not only is their job dangerous, but each week they have to work 54 hours. This has been unfair compared to other disciplinary government departments who are limited to 48.

They have held a 48-hour protest to ask the government to reduce the working hours to 48 or 44 hours a week. The government earlier wanted the fire department to cut hours in exchange for cutting wages, but this has not been acceptable to the fire department. The department has said this Mongkok fire proved the department should never be shorthanded.

== Aftermath ==
Two suspects are wanted by the police. There have been comparisons made that since the 1997 handover, only two fire incidents have exceeded this. The 1996 Garley Building fire and the January 1997 arson attack on Top One Karaoke in Tsim Sha Tsui in which 17 died and 13 were injured.

The Hong Kong government is placing blame on street-level hawkers for endangering lives with illegal storage of goods in the stairwells and blocking exits. On the other hand, area residents blame the government's lack of control over cubicle-style units and for favouring developers over rights to have safe affordable housing.
