= Free Ai Weiwei street art campaign =

2011 protest in Hong Kong

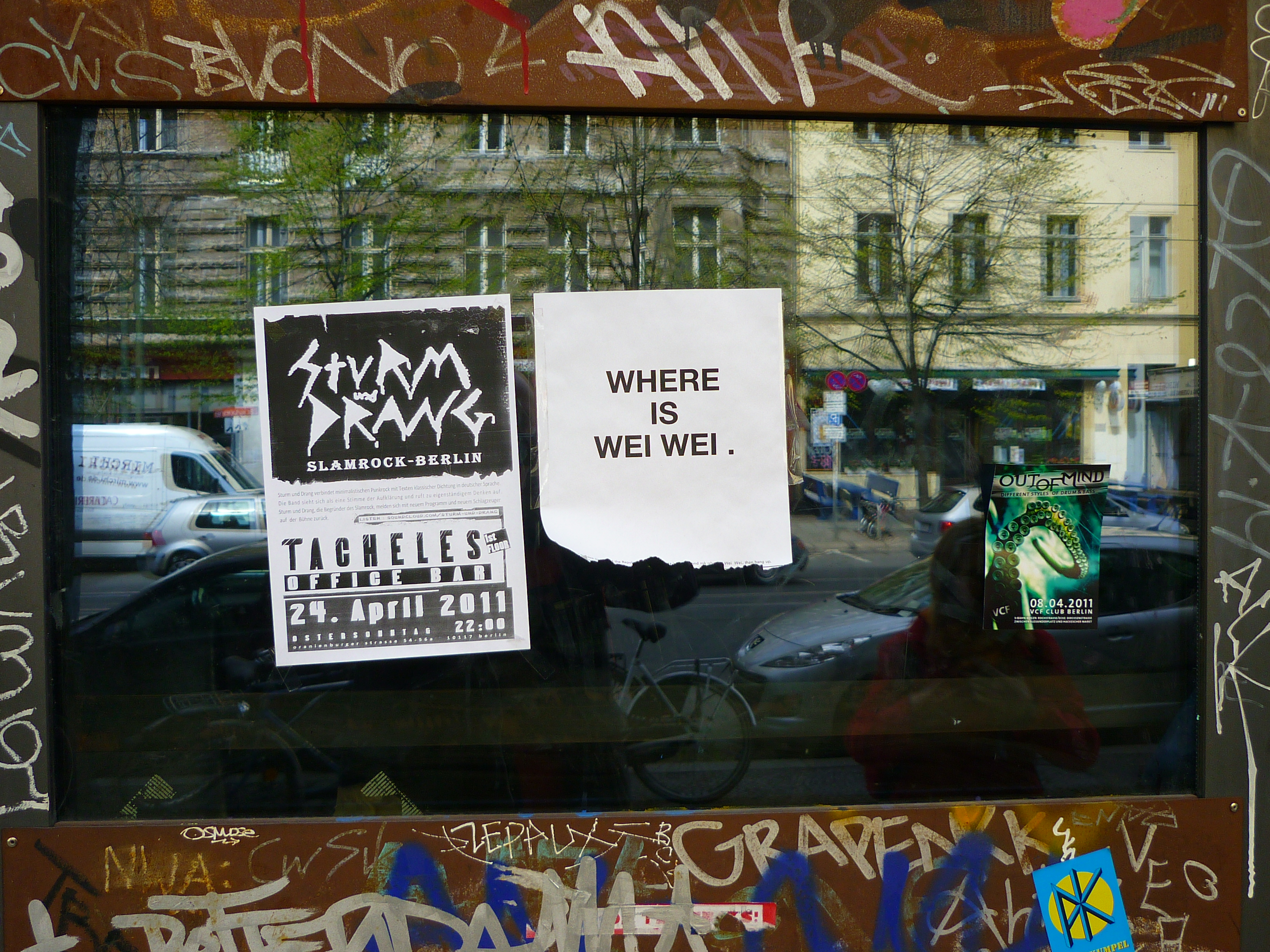
"Where Is Wei Wei" graffiti in Berlin, 2011

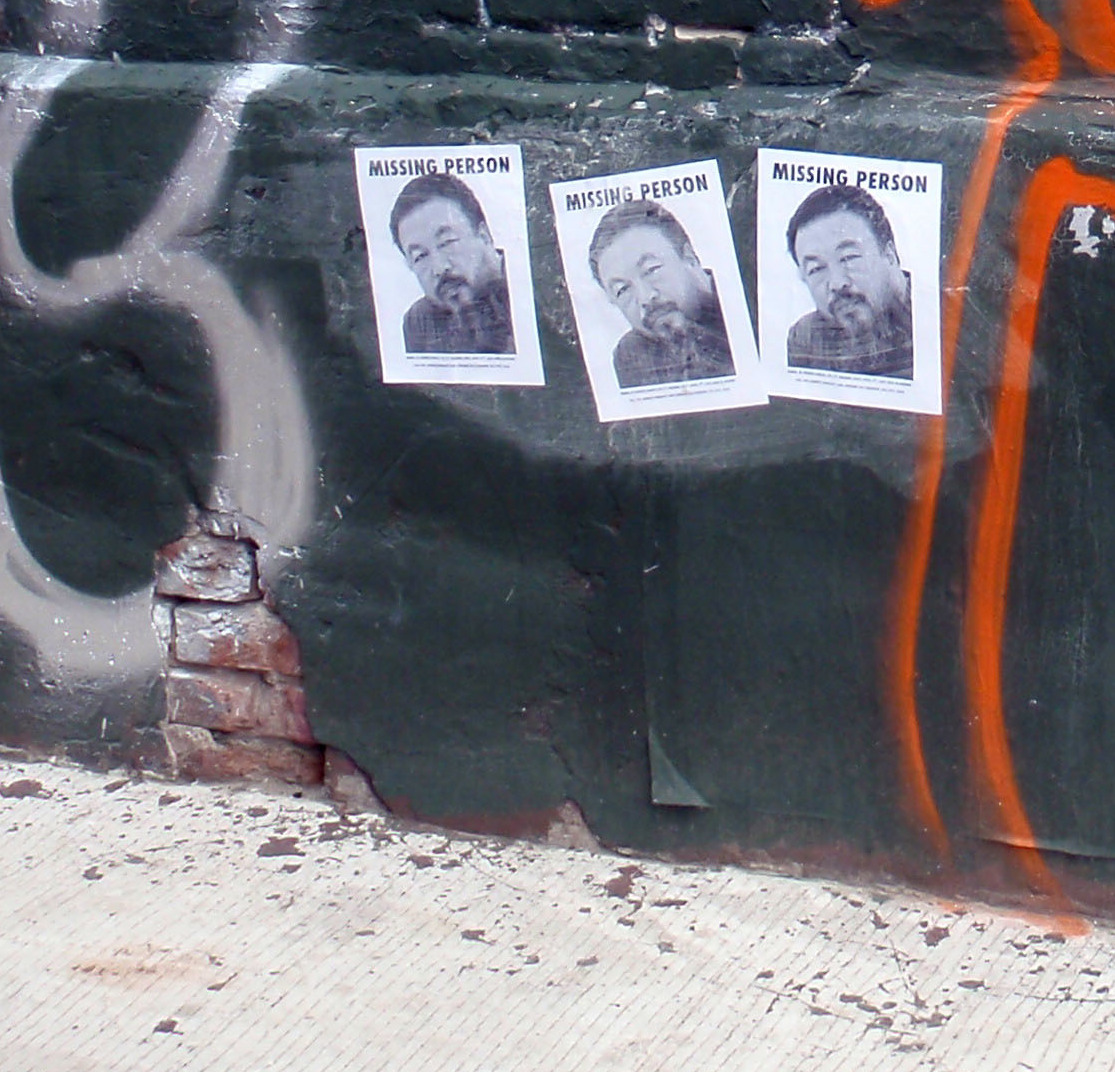
"Missing person" posters in Washington DC, 2011

The Free Ai Weiwei street art campaign was a series of protests during the PRC government's secret detention of Chinese artist Ai Weiwei for 81 days in 2011, organised by Hong Kong artists and art supporters. Various slogans calling for the immediate release of the artist such as "Free Ai Weiwei", and "Who's afraid of Ai Weiwei" accompany stencilled images of Ai were applied onto pavements, pedestrian overpass, and building walls all over Hong Kong, and similar posters and signs were displayed worldwide.

== Forms ==
=== Internet ===
"Love the Future" (愛未來) was a popular protest slogan because it is a pun on Ai's name. Chinese internet users posted many variations based on this theme. Posts for the internet campaign were removed relentlessly by state censors.

=== Stencilled graffiti ===
Tangerine, a 22-year-old student artist, was the first Hong Kong artist using graffiti art to promote the awareness of Ai Weiwei among the island's population, by spray-painting Ai's image, with the slogan: "Who's afraid of Ai Weiwei", onto street pavement and building wall using a stencil, resulting in Hong Kong police serious crime squad conducting a criminal damage investigation against her, thus turning her into an "inadvertent counterculture icon." Tangerine's comment towards the police:

I have to thank the police for drawing so much attention to this issue. Even if I have to go to jail, I think that would be a very, very worth it price to pay."

=== Art Citizens / "Love the Future" art exhibition ===
A group named Art Citizens (藝術公民), formed by Hong Kong visual artist Kacey Wong, rallied some 2,000 people from the artistic community to march for Ai on 23 April. The group held a month-long exhibition that opened on 26 May named "Love the Future" (愛未來) showing works of over 50 artists.

=== Projected graffiti ===
An artist calling himself Cpak Ming projected a giant stenciled Ai Weiwei image onto police, army, and various government building walls, and photographs of these images were being uploaded onto Facebook support Ai Weiwei accounts, and a PLA spokesperson said they would "reserve its legal rights to act".

=== 1001 chairs protest ===
On 2 May 2011, Lee Cheuk-yan of the Hong Kong Alliance in Support of Patriotic Democratic Movements in China organised about 200 Hong Kong protesters in Victoria Park using chairs to create a formation represents the Chinese word "prisoner" (Chinese: 囚), and they then broke through the chair barrier, "as though they were breaking down the one-party prison. "

== Arrests ==
On 8 May 2011, Hong Kong police arrested two League of Social Democrats protesters for using chalk to write "Free Ai Weiwei" slogans on the street, when more than 100 protesters took part in "All Hong Kong support graffiti" activities and were encouraged to create graffiti on the street with chalk. The chairman of League of Social Democrats, Andrew To commented that the Hong Kong government is over sensitive and nervous about the graffiti that it behaves like birds that are frighten of sling shots (Chinese: 驚弓之鳥). The two protesters were being released the next day on bail.
