= 1987 in Hong Kong =

Events in the year 1987 in British Hong Kong.

== Incumbents ==
- Monarch of the United Kingdom – Elizabeth II
- Governor – Sir David Akers-Jones (until 9 April), Sir David Wilson (from 9 April)

== Events ==
=== September ===
On September 1, a bus (S3BL185, license plate number DR3414) traveling on Route 72X towards Tai Kok Tsui Ferry Terminal crashed into a parking lot that stopped due to a breakdown on Tolo Harbor Highway near the Sha Tin Racecourse staff dormitory. The heavy goods vehicle in the slow lane was hit to the side, and the front of the bus and the left side of the body were punctured, resulting in the death of 2 people on the bus and the injury of 26 people. When KMB purchased the same type of bus at the end of the year, it bought an extra set of body (Alexander RH body) with a smaller license box for partial reconstruction, and put it into service together with the new bus issued in 1988.

=== October ===
The October 1987 crash hit stock markets around the world, but Hong Kong was hammered especially hard. On Monday, October 19, the city's benchmark Hang Seng index fell 11 per cent, a slump that prompted stock exchange chairman Ronald Li to suspend trading for the rest of the week “to protect the investor”.

== Births ==
- September 30 – Elanne Kong, actress and singer

== See also ==
- List of Hong Kong films of 1987
