= Timeline of Hong Kong history =

The following is a timeline of the history of Hong Kong.

== Imperial China ==
Date	Ruling entity	Events	Other people/events
221 BC	Qin dynasty	First records of the territory in Chinese history	
206 BC	Han dynasty	Inhabitants in Ma Wan Island	
25 AD		Building of Lei Cheng Uk Han Tomb (est.)	
901 AD		Punti settlement	
1075	Song dynasty	Founding of Li Ying College	
1163		Salt fields in Hong Kong first officially managed	
1277		China's Imperial court found refuge in Silvermine Bay on Lantau Island during the Battle of Yamen	
1513	Ming dynasty	Jorge Álvares arrives in Tuen Mun	
1521		Battle of Tunmen	
1562		Battle of Sincouwaan	
1661	Qing dynasty	Kangxi Emperor orders the Great Clearance, which requires the evacuation of the coastal areas of Guangdong. What is now the territory of Hong Kong became largely wasteland during the ban.	
1669		The coastal ban is lifted	
1685			Kangxi Emperor opens limited trade on a regular basis starting with Canton
1757			British East India Company pursued a monopoly on opium production beginning with India in the Far East
1793			Anglo-Chinese relations
1839		Battle of Kowloon	First Opium War (1839–1842)

== Colonial Hong Kong ==
=== British Crown colony ===
Date	Governor	Events	Other people/events
1841	Charles Elliot	Convention of Chuenpi; Commodore Gordon Bremer at Possession Point	
1842	Henry Pottinger	Treaty of Nanjing	
1843		Formation of the Legislative Council and Executive Council	Ying Wa College, world's first Anglo-Chinese school relocated to Hong Kong
1844			
1847	John Francis Davis	Building of Kowloon Walled city	
1848			
1851	George Bonham		Taiping Rebellion
1853		Chinese serial	
1854			
1855	John Bowring	First proposal of Praya Reclamation Scheme; Battle of Ty-ho Bay	
1856		Second Opium War	
1859	Hercules Robinson		
1860		Convention of Peking, British rules Kowloon south of Boundary Street, Establishment of Diocesan Girls' School	
1861		British acquired Kowloon Peninsula	Frederick Stewart modernise HK education
1865		Establishment of HK Shanghai Bank	
1866	Richard Graves; MacDonnell	Four big families of Hong Kong (est.)	
1868		The Viceroy of Guangdong and Guangxi, ordered four customs stations to be established in waterways surrounding Hong Kong and Kowloon at Fat Tong Chau, Ma Wan, Cheung Chau and Kowloon Walled City. It was so-called "blockade of Hong Kong" by the Hong Kong Government. These stations ceased to operate in 1899 after the lease of the New Territories to Britain.	
1872		Tung Wah Hospital established	
1874	Arthur Kennedy	1874 Hong Kong Typhoon	Founding of the Universal Circulating Herald
1877	Arthur Kennedy		
1882	John Pope Hennessy		
1883	George Bowen		
1887	William Des Vœux	Western medical science reaches Hong Kong College of Medicine for Chinese	
1888		Founding of Peak Tram	
1891	William Robinson		
1894		Third Pandemic of Bubonic Plague	
1898		Second Convention of Peking, British rules New Territories and New Kowloon	
1899		Six-Day War	
1904	Henry Arthur Blake	Peak Reservation Ordinance	
1906		1906 Hong Kong typhoon	
1907	Matthew Nathan		
1908		1908 Hong Kong Typhoon	
1910		Opening of Kowloon–Canton Railway	
1912	Frederick Lugard		Establishment of the Republic of China, Qing dynasty overthrown
1918		Happy Valley Racecourse fire Gresson Street shootout	
1919	Francis Henry May		
1921		Praya East Reclamation Scheme	
1922		Seamen's strike of 1922	
1923	Reginald Edward Stubbs	Sun Yat-sen proclaimed his anti-corruption revolutionary ideas came from Hong Kong during HK university speech	
1924		Land allocation for Kai Tak Airport	
1925		Canton-Hong Kong strike	
1926	Cecil Clementi	First Chinese member appointed to Executive Council	
1928		First pre-RTHK radio broadcast	
1930	William Peel		
1933		Founding of Kowloon Motor Bus	
1935	Andrew Caldecott		
1937		Great Hong Kong Typhoon of 1937	

=== British Crown colony ===
Date	Governor	Events	Other people/events
1947		First government count of Hong Kong Taxi	
1948	Alexander Grantham	HK Social Welfare Department formed	
1949			Establishment of People's Republic of China
1953		Shek Kip Mei Fire	
1955			Kashmir Princess assassination attempt
1956		Hong Kong 1956 riots	
1957		RTV a first terrestrial television station	Asian Flu
1958	Robert Brown Black		
1960		Four Asian Tigers (est.); Typhoon Mary	
1962		Typhoon Wanda	
1964	David Clive Crosbie Trench		
1966		Hong Kong 1966 riots Visit of Princess Margaret in March	Cultural Revolution in China
1967		Hong Kong 1967 riots TVB a second terrestrial television station	
1968		Hong Kong flu	
1971	Murray MacLehose	6-year free Primary education funded	Typhoon Rose
1972		Small House Policy; 1972 Hong Kong landslides	PRC request HK and Macau off United Nations list
1974		Independent Commission Against Corruption established Home Ownership Scheme introduced	
1976		Home Ownership Scheme introduced	
1978			Reform and opening up begins in China
1979		Establishment of Mass Transit Railway	
1980		United front in Hong Kong (est.)	
1982	Edward Youde	ATV replacing RTV	
1983		Black Saturday	
1984		Sino-British Joint Declaration and the proposal of One country, two systems	
1985		Braemar Hill murders	
1987	David Wilson	Black Monday	
1989		More than 1 million people marched for three consecutive Sundays in Hong Kong, including 1.5 million on May 28.	1989 Tiananmen Square protests and massacre
1990		Basic Law proclaimed	
1991		STAR TV a first satellite television station	
1992	Chris Patten	United States-Hong Kong Policy Act	
1993		Cable TV Hong Kong a first pay television station Lan Kwai Fong stampede	
1996		Garley Building fire Phoenix Satellite Television a first satellite television station based in Hong Kong	
1997		Tsing Ma Bridge opened. Hong Kong transferred to the People's Republic of China.	

== HKSAR ==
Date	Chief Executive	Events	Other people/events
1997	Tung Chee Hwa	First Special Administrative Region government formed. Beginning of mass poultry disposal as part of Bird Flu crisis.	1997 Asian financial crisis
1998	Tung Chee Hwa	Kai Tak International Airport replaced by Hong Kong International Airport First post-handover elections	
1999	Tung Chee Hwa	Right of Abode debate Hello Kitty murder Flight 642 crash	PRC bans Falun Gong cult
2001	Tung Chee Hwa	Director of Immigration v Chong Fung Yuen	
2003	Tung Chee Hwa	SARS outbreak, 1:99 Concert; Leslie Cheung suicide CEPA; Demonstration against Article 23; Harbour Fest; Murder of Robert Kissel; Death of Anita Mui	
2005	Donald Tsang	Resignation of Tung Chee-hwa; Opening of Hong Kong Disneyland; 2005 Hong Kong electoral reform 2005 protest for democracy WTO Hong Kong Ministerial Conference	
2006	Donald Tsang	Opening of Ngong Ping 360; Demolition of Star Ferry Pier; The Bus Uncle	
2007	Donald Tsang	MTR–KCR merger 2007 HK Island by-election	
2008	Donald Tsang	Edison Chen photo scandal Leung Chin-man appointment controversy HK holds 2008 Olympics Equestrian event HK holds 2008 Paralympics Equestrian event ATV management debacle Citizens' Radio raided Mong Kok acid attacks Demolition of Queen's Pier	Beijing Olympics; Bankruptcy of Lehman Brothers; Sichuan earthquake Artistes 512 Fund Raising Campaign
2009	Donald Tsang	2009 East Asian Games; 20th anniversary of the 1989 Tiananmen Square protests and massacre 2009 Hong Kong Broadcasting Authority forum 2009 flu pandemic in Hong Kong	Hong Kong Macau cultural exchange July 2009 Ürümqi riots 2008 financial crisis Xinjiang journalist attack Artistes 88 Fund Raising Campaign
2010	Donald Tsang	2010 Hong Kong new year march Five Constituencies referendum TVB monopoly case 21st anniversary of the 1989 Tiananmen Square protests and massacre CE and LegCo selection document	Opposition to the Guangzhou-Hong Kong Express Rail Link; Artistes 414 Fund Raising Campaign; Manila hostage crisis
2011	Donald Tsang	Hong Kong 818 incident Vallejos v. Commissioner of Registration; 2011 Fa Yuen street fire	Free Ai Weiwei street art campaign
2012	Donald Tsang	Dolce & Gabbana photo incident Early 2012 Hong Kong protests Moral and National Education controversy Hong Kong plastic disaster Lamma Island ferry collision	Hong Kong mainland China driving scheme
2013	CY Leung	Comilang v. Commissioner of Registration; Vallejos v. Commissioner of Registration; 2013 Hong Kong dock strike	
2014	CY Leung	Knife attack on Kevin Lau; 2014 electoral reform 2014 Hong Kong Protests (Umbrella Revolution)	
2015	CY Leung	Causeway Bay Books disappearances Heavy metal in drinking water incidents HKU pro-vice-chancellor selection controversy	
2016	CY Leung	January 2016 East Asia cold wave Mong Kok civil unrest Hong Kong Legislative Council oath-taking controversy Hong Kong LegCo candidates' disqualification controversy	
2017	Carrie Lam	Imprisonment of Hong Kong democracy activists	
2018	Carrie Lam	Opening of Guangzhou–Shenzhen–Hong Kong Express Rail Link Hong Kong section Tai Po Road bus accident Opening of the Hong Kong–Zhuhai–Macau Bridge; Victor Mallet visa controversy Typhoon Mangkhut	
2019	Carrie Lam	Extradition law controversy (protests)	
2020	Carrie Lam	COVID-19 pandemic National Anthem Ordinance passed National Security Law passed Opening of Tuen Mun–Chek Lap Kok Link	
2021	Carrie Lam	2021 Hong Kong electoral changes Massive resign and disqualification of District Councilor; Opening of Tuen Ma Line; 2021 Hong Kong legislative election	
2022	John Lee Ka-chiu	Hong Kong recorded more than 2.6 million COVID-19 cases.	
2023	John Lee Ka-chiu	End of COVID-19 pandemic restrictions Implementation of Real-name Registration for SIM Card; 2023 Hong Kong electoral changes	End of Zero-COVID Policy
2024	John Lee Ka-chiu	Safeguarding National Security Ordinance (aka Hong Kong Basic Law Article 23) passed Banning of the song Glory to Hong Kong	
2025	John Lee Ka-chiu	Wang Fuk Court fire	

== See also ==
- Political events in Hong Kong since 1997
- Timeline of Chinese history
- Hong Kong 1 July marches
