= 1936 in China =

- Decades: 1910s; 1920s; 1930s; 1940s; 1950s
- See also: Other events of 1936; History of China • Timeline • Years

Events from the year 1936 in China.

== Incumbents ==
- President: Lin Sen
- Premier: Chiang Kai-shek
- Vice Premier: Kung Hsiang-hsi
- Foreign Minister: Zhang Qun

== Events ==
- October–November - Suiyuan Campaign
- December 12 - Xi'an Incident

== Births ==
=== January ===
- January 31 — Zeng Xianyi, professor of legal history (d. 2011)

=== February ===
- February 20 — Li Mingqi, actress
- Zhang Tingyan, 1st Chinese Ambassador to South Korea
- Ma Yutao, opera singer and military general

=== March ===
- March 4 — Xu Qinan, engineer

=== April ===
- April 18 — Yuan Xingpei, scholar, educator, author and political leader

=== May ===
- Li Aizhen, scientist

=== July ===
- July 24 — Yan Huaili, actor (d. 2009)

=== August ===
- August 9 — Patrick Tse, Hong Kong actor, producer, screenwriter and director
- August 27 — Lien Chan, 3rd Chairman of the Kuomintang

=== September ===
- September 10 — Liu Xingtu, agronomist (d. 2021)
- September 18 — Li Tieying, politician
- Liu Mingzu, 7th Secretary of the Inner Mongolia Autonomous Regional Committee of the Chinese Communist Party (d. 2022)

=== October ===
- October 20 — Zhong Nanshan, pulmonologist

=== November ===
- November 7 — Zheng Zhenyao, film and television actress (d. 2023)

=== December ===
- December 8 — Zhang Xianliang, novelist, essayist and poet (d. 2014)
- December 26 — Han Meilin, artist
- Shu Shengyou, 10th Governor of Jiangxi

=== Unknown dates ===
- Zheng Shuang, woodcut artist
- Xia Feiyun, conductor

== Deaths ==
- January 5 — Ding Wenjiang, essayist, geologist and writer (b. 1887)
- March 19 — Lim Nee Soon, Singaporean banker and businessman (b. 1879)
- April 14 — Liu Zhidan, communist military commander (b. 1903)
- May 12 — Hu Hanmin, philosopher and politician (b. 1879)
- June 14 — Zhang Binglin, philologist, textual critic, philosopher and revolutionary (b. 1869)
- June 28 — Lien Heng, Taiwanese historian, politician, poet, merchant and editor of a Tainan local newspaper (b. 1878)
- August 2 — Zhao Yiman, Anti-Japanese resistance fighter (b. 1905)
- September 12 — Pan Fu, 20th Premier of the Republic of China (b. 1883)
- September 20 — Wang Yaqiao, gangster and assassin leader (b. 1887)
- October 19 — Lu Xun, writer, literary critic, lecturer and state servant (b. 1881)
- November 2 — Duan Qirui, warlord, politician and commander of the Beiyang Army (b. 1865)
- December 4 — Sai Jinhua, prostitute who became acquaintance of Alfred von Waldersee (b. 1872)
- December 6 — Huang Fu, general and politician (b. 1880)
- December 12 — Yau Lit, revolutionary and one of the Four Bandits (b. 1864)

== See also ==
- List of Chinese films of the 1930s
