= 1952 in China =

- Decades: 1930s; 1940s; 1950s; 1960s; 1970s
- See also: Other events of 1952; History of China • Timeline • Years

Events in the year 1952 in China.

== Incumbents ==
- Chairman of the Chinese Communist Party – Mao Zedong
- Chairman of the Government – Mao Zedong
- Vice Chairmen of the Government – Zhu De Liu Shaoqi, Song Qingling, Li Jishen, Zhang Lan, Gao Gang
- Premier – Zhou Enlai
- Vice Premiers – Dong Biwu, Chen Yun, Guo Moruo, Huang Yanpei, Deng Xiaoping

=== Governors ===
- Governor of Anhui Province – Zeng Xisheng (starting unknown)
- Governor of Fujian Province – Zhang Dingcheng
- Governor of Gansu Province – Deng Baoshan
- Governor of Guangdong Province – Ye Jianying
- Governor of Guizhou Province – Yang Yong
- Governor of Hebei Province – Yang Xiufeng then Lin Tie
- Governor of Heilongjiang Province – Yu Yifu then Zhao Dezun
- Governor of Henan Province – Wu Zhipu
- Governor of Hubei Province – Li Xiannian
- Governor of Hunan Province – Wang Shoudao then Cheng Qian
- Governor of Jiangsu Province – Tan Zhenlin (starting unknown)
- Governor of Jiangxi Province – Shao Shiping
- Governor of Jilin Province – Zhou Chiheng then Li Youwen
- Governor of Qinghai Province – Zhao Shoushan then Zhang Zhongliang
- Governor of Shaanxi Province – Ma Mingfang (until November), Zhao Shoushan (starting November)
- Governor of Shandong Province – Kang Sheng
- Governor of Shanxi Province – Lai Ruoyu then Pei Lisheng
- Governor of Sichuan Province – Li Jingquan (starting September)
- Governor of Yunnan Province – Chen Geng
- Governor of Zhejiang Province – Tan Zhenlin

== Events ==
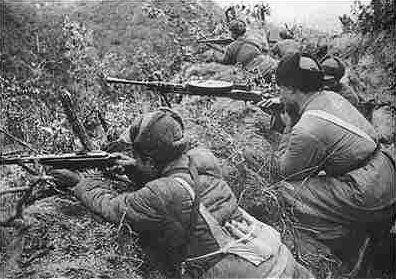
Battle of Triangle Hill: A squad of Chinese infantrymen in defensive position on Triangle Hill.

- January 26 - The Five-anti campaign was launched in an effort to rid Chinese cities of corruption and enemies of the state. It became an all out war against the bourgeoisie in China.
- April 11–15 – Chinese Civil War: Battle of Nanri Island
- October 14-November 25 – Korean War: Battle of Triangle Hill

== Births ==
=== January ===
- January 2 — Ng Man-tat, Hong Kong actor (d. 2021)
- January 7 — Sammo Hung, Hong Kong actor, martial artist, film producer and film director
- January 8 — Chen Ziming, dissident and columnist for Deutsche Welle (d. 2014)
- January 25 — Liu He, economist and former Vice Premier of China

=== February ===
- February 7 — Tony Liu, Hong Kong actor and martial artist
- February 8 — Nora Miao, Hong Kong film actress
- February 13 — Lung Ying-tai, Taiwanese writer, cultural critic and public intellectual
- February 21 — Jia Pingwa, author of novels
- Zhang Beisan, diplomat

=== March ===
- March 25 — Jung Chang, Chinese-born British author and historian
- March 26 — Wang Jun, 12th Secretary of the Inner Mongolia Autonomous Regional Committee of the Chinese Communist Party

=== April ===
- April 20 — Ureltu, Evenk writer
- April 23 — Tian Zhuangzhuang, film director, producer and actor

=== May ===
- May 1 — Huang Qifan, 17th Mayor of Chongqing
- May 2 — Lee Li-chun, Taiwanese actor and xiangsheng performer
- May 4 — Tang Guoqiang, highest ranking actor
- May 6
  - Zhang Zhaozhong, military theorist
  - Wang Lin, qigong and psi practitioner (d. 2017)
- May 13 — Wang Xiaobo, novelist and essayist (d. 1997)
- May 18 — Lu Zhangong, 14th Secretary of the Henan Provincial Committee of the Chinese Communist Party
- May 21 — John Shum, Hong Kong actor and film producer

=== June ===
- Wu Hanming, microelectronics engineer
- Bao Kexin, politician and business executive (d. 2019)

=== July ===
- July 28 — Shu Ting, poet

=== August ===
- August 6 — Danny Lee, Hong Kong actor, film producer, screenwriter, director, action director and presenter
- August 12 — Chen Kaige, film director, producer, and screen writer
- August 22 — Hau Lung-pin, 12th Mayor of Taipei
- August 28 — Zhang Xinfeng, police and security official

=== September ===
- September 6 — Henry Tang, 3rd Financial Secretary of Hong Kong

=== October ===
- October 1 — Anthony Chan, Hong Kong actor
- October 26 — Luo Baoming, 6th Governor of Hainan
- October 31 — Wu Ziniu, film director
- Bi Shumin, novelist, self-help writer and psychiatrist
- Zhang Junzhao, film director and screenwriter (d. 2018)

=== November ===
- November 12 — Liu Wen-cheng, Taiwanese singer and actor

=== December ===
- December 20 — Zhu Lin, film actress
- December 23 — Chi Chongrui, actor
- December 27 — Lam Ching-ying, Hong Kong stuntman, actor, martial artist and action director (d. 1997)
- Zheng Qingdian, diplomat

== Deaths ==
=== April ===
- April 10 — Sa Zhenbing, prominent admiral of the late Qing Dynasty and the Republic of China (b. 1859)
- Wang Weike, translator (b. 1900)

=== July ===
- July 29 — Rong Desheng, industrialist (b. 1875)

=== August ===
- August 8 — Fan Wanzhang, MiG-15 pilot of the 3rd Fighter Aviation Division of the People's Liberation Army Air Force (b. 1927)
- August 12 — Wang Shijing, politician and banker in the Republic of China (b. 1887)

=== September ===
- September 7 — Lu Muzhen, first wife of Chinese revolutionary Sun Yat-sen (b. 1867)

=== October ===
- October 12 — Qiu Shaoyun, PLA soldier (b. 1926)
- October 19 — Huang Jiguang, highly-decorated PLA soldier (b. 1931)

=== November ===
- November 27 — Zhou Xuechang, important figure of the Wang Jingwei regime (b. 1898)

=== December ===
- December 3 — Sun Shenlu, pilot of the People's Liberation Army Air Force (b. 1928)

=== Dates unknown ===
- Wang Jingguo, nationalist general from Shanxi (b. 1893)
- Mao Zuquan, nationalist politician (b. 1883)

== See also ==
- 1952 in Chinese film
