= 1955 in China =

- Decades: 1930s; 1940s; 1950s; 1960s; 1970s
- See also: Other events of 1955; History of China • Timeline • Years

Events in the year 1955 in China. The country had an estimated population of 605 million people.

== Incumbents ==
- Chairman of the Chinese Communist Party: Mao Zedong
- President of the People's Republic of China: Mao Zedong
- Premier of the People's Republic of China: Zhou Enlai
- Chairman of the National People's Congress: Liu Shaoqi
- Vice President of the People's Republic of China: Zhu De
- Vice Premier of the People's Republic of China: Chen Yun

=== Governors ===
- Governor of Anhui Province: Zeng Xisheng then Huang Yan
- Governor of Fujian Province: Ye Fei
- Governor of Gansu Province: Deng Baoshan
- Governor of Guangdong Province: Tao Zhu
- Governor of Guizhou Province: Zhou Lin
- Governor of Hebei Province: Lin Tie
- Governor of Heilongjiang Province: Han Guang
- Governor of Henan Province: Wu Zhipu
- Governor of Hubei Province: Liu Zihou then Zhang Tixue
- Governor of Hunan Province: Cheng Qian
- Governor of Jiangsu Province: Tan Zhenlin then Hui Yuyu
- Governor of Jiangxi Province: Shao Shiping
- Governor of Jilin Province: Li Youwen
- Governor of Liaoning Province: Du Zheheng
- Governor of Qinghai Province: Sun Zuobin
- Governor of Shaanxi Province: Zhao Shoushan
- Governor of Shandong Province: Kang Sheng then Zhao Jianmin
- Governor of Shanxi Province: Pei Lisheng
- Governor of Sichuan Province: Li Jingquan then Li Dazhang
- Governor of Yunnan Province: Chen Geng then Guo Yingqiu
- Governor of Zhejiang Province: Tan Zhenlin then Sha Wenhan

== Events ==
- Continuing Kuomintang Islamic insurgency in China
- January 18 to January 20 — Battle of Yijiangshan Islands
- January 19 to February 26 — Battle of Dachen Archipelago
- January 29 — Formosa Resolution of 1955
- April 11 — Kashmir Princess
- until May 1 — First Taiwan Strait Crisis
- August — Start of the Sufan movement
- September–November Bumper rice and wheat crop

=== Other events ===
- July — Opening of Taizhou Luqiao Airport
- Opening of the Chongqing Zoo
- Completion of the Sino-Soviet Friendship Building, in Shanghai

==== Other establishments ====
- Pingshi Prison
- Shushan Prison
- Sunan Shuofang International Airport

== Education ==
- Establishments:
  - Beijing University of Posts and Telecommunications
  - China Foreign Affairs University
  - Chongqing Communication Institute
  - Chongqing No.1 Middle School
  - Guangdong Institute of Education
  - Zhongyuan University of Technology

== Sports ==
- Establishment of Jilin FC

== Births ==
=== January ===
- January 1 — Yang Yumin, footballer
- January 9 — Qiao Liang, military theorist and author
- January 17 — Zhang Guoli, actor and film director
- Wang Jiasheng, former Political Commissar of the People's Liberation Army Rocket Force

=== February ===
- February 1 — Shing Fui-On, Hong Kong actor (d. 2009)
- February 4 — He Lifeng, economist and politician
- February 8 — Xu Bing, artist
- February 17 — Mo Yan, novelist and short story writer
- Bagatur, 10th Chairman of the Inner Mongolia Autonomous Region

=== March ===
- March 5 — Wang Yang, 9th Chairman of the Chinese People's Political Consultative Conference
- March 13 — Edmund Ho, 1st Chief Executive of Macau
- March 18 — Paul Chan Mo-po, 5th Financial Secretary of Hong Kong
- March 19 — Simon Yam, Hong Kong actor and film producer
- Hu Zejun, politician
- Fu Zhenghua, former politician and public security officer

=== April ===
- April 20 — Xi Meijuan, actress
- April 26 — Chen Daoming, actor
- April 27 — Jing Yidan, former television host

=== May ===
- May 18 — Chow Yun-fat, Hong Kong actor and film actor
- May 20 — Miao Wei, manufacturing executive and politician
- May 27 — Luo Shugang, politician

=== June ===
- June 9 — Guo Da, actor and sketch comedy performer
- June 15 — Zheng Yuanjie, children's writer
- June 16 — Cai Mingzhao, politician and journalist

=== July ===
- July 3 — Li Keqiang, 7th Premier of China (d. 2023)
- July 17
  - Li Shaohong, film director and producer
  - Fei Yu-ching, Taiwanese singer and television host

=== August ===
- August 22 — Gordon Liu, Hong Kong actor and martial artist

=== September ===
- September 8 — Fan Zhiqi, actor (d. 2010)
- September 16 — Zhang Haidi, writer
- September 18 — Liu Cigui, 10th Secretary of the Hainan Provincial Committee of the Chinese Communist Party
- September 23 — Ma Shaohua, Hui actor
- Bi Jingquan, politician

=== October ===
- October 6 — Wang Huning, 10th Chairman of the Chinese People's Political Consultative Conference
- October 26 — Wong Yue, Hong Kong martial arts film actor (d. 2008)
- October 30 — Liu Xiaoqing, actress and businesswoman
- Zhong Shan, politician and business executive
- Yu Weiguo, 13th Secretary of the Fujian Provincial Committee of the Chinese Communist Party
- Song Xiuyan, 17th Governor of Qinghai

=== November ===
- November 22 — Ding Lieyun, management scientist and educator
- Chen Quanguo, Member of the 19th Politburo of the Chinese Communist Party
- Li Qiang, politician from Jiangsu province

=== December ===
- December 5 — Cai Qi, First-ranked Secretary of the 20th Secretariat of the Chinese Communist Party
- December 7 — He Qun, filmmaker (d. 2016)
- December 28 — Liu Xiaobo, literary critic and human rights activist (d. 2017)
- Wang Yong, former State Councilor of China

=== Unknown dates ===
- Mai Cheng, Norwegian painter

== Deaths ==
- February 9 — Zhang Lan, 1st Chairman of the China Democratic League (b. 1872)
- February 23 — Shi Dongshan, film director and screenwriter (b. 1902)
- March 23 — Kai Feng, communist revolutionary and politician (b. 1906)
- March 25 — Huang Binhong, literati painter and art historian (b. 1865)
- April 1 — Lin Huiyin, architect, writer and poet (b. 1904)
- August 29 — Hong Shen, playwright, film director and screenwriter (b. 1894)

== See also ==
- 1955 in Chinese film
