= 1933 in China =

- Decades: 1910s; 1920s; 1930s; 1940s; 1950s
- See also: Other events of 1933; History of China • Timeline • Years

Events from the year 1933 in China.

== Incumbents ==
- President: Lin Sen
- Premier: Wang Jingwei
- Vice Premier: Soong Tse-ven (until November 4), Kung Hsiang-hsi (starting November 4)

== Events ==
- January 1 - May 31 — Defense of the Great Wall
- January – March 22 — Fourth Encirclement Campaign against Jiangxi Soviet
- February 21 - March 1 — Battle of Rehe
- Battle of Urumqi (1933)
- May 31
  - Battle of Aksu (1933)
  - Tanggu Truce
- June — Kizil massacre
- July — Battle of Toksun
- Battle of Sekes Tash
- August 25 — 1933 Diexi earthquake
- September 25 — beginning of the Fifth Encirclement Campaign against Jiangxi Soviet
- September 26 — Battle of Kashgar (1933)
- September 28 — Nationalists capture Lichuan from Communists.
- October 9 — Failure of Communist attack on Xiaoshi.
- November 12 — Establishment of First East Turkestan Republic
- November 22 — Fujian Rebellion

== Births ==
=== January ===
- January 18 — Kar-Sing Lam, Hong Kong Cantonese opera singer (d. 2016)
- Wang Senhao, 12th Governor of Shanxi (d. 2022)

=== February ===
- February 16 — Xia Meng, Hong Kong actress and film producer (d. 2016)

=== April ===
- April 3 — Fu Da-ren, Taiwanese basketball player and television presenter (d. 2018)

=== May ===
- May 4 — Ni Zhifu, engineer, inventor and high-ranking politician (d. 2013)
- May 11 — Nian Weisi, football manager and player
- May 22 — Chen Jingrun, mathematician (d. 1996)
- May 23 — Fu Jiamo, professor (d. 2015)
- May 28 — Ruan Chongwu, 3rd Governor of Hainan

=== June ===
- June 1 — Li Peiyao, politician (d. 1996)
- June 13 — Grace Chang, Hong Kong actress and singer

=== July ===
- An Qiyuan, 11th Secretary of the Shaanxi Provincial Committee of the Chinese Communist Party (d. 2024)

=== August ===
- Chen Guangyi, 6th Secretary of the Fujian Provincial Committee of the Chinese Communist Party
- Uliji, 6th Chairman of Inner Mongolia (d. 2000)

=== September ===
- September 5 — Lin Wenyue, Taiwanese scholar, writer, translator and professor (d. 2023)
- September 16 — You Benchang, actor

=== November ===
- November 4 — Charles K. Kao, physicist (d. 2018)
- November 23 — Huang Qizao, politician (d. 2000)
- Lu Gongxun, delegate to the 8th National People's Congress and 9th National People's Congress (d. 2023)

=== December ===
- Liu Lianman, mountain climber (d. 2016)

== Deaths ==
- April 9 — Liang Shiyi, 11th Premier of the Republic of China (b. 1869)
- April 27 — Cen Chunxuan, politician in the late Qing dynasty and the Republic of China (b. 1861)
- May 1 — Duan Dechang, member of the Chinese Workers' and Peasants' Red Army (b. 1904)
- May 6 — Li Ching-Yuen, herbalist, martial artist and tactical advisor
- May 7 — Zhang Jingyao, general and military governor of Chahar and later Hunan (b. 1881)
- May 15 — Lu Yongxiang, warlord of the Anhui clique (b. 1867)
- June 18 — Yang Xingfo, management scholar and activist (b. 1893)
- August 9 — Timur Beg, Uyghur rebel military leader (b. 1886)
- September 21 — Deng Zhongxia, important Marxist intellectual and labor movement leader (b. 1894)
- September 22 — Chen Jiongming, lawyer, military general, revolutionary, federalist and politician (b. 1878)
- November 20 — Shen Zemin, one of the earliest members of the Chinese Communist Party (b. 1900)
- November 24 — Hu Weide, politician and diplomat (b. 1863)
- December 17 — Thubten Gyatso, 13th Dalai Lama (b. 1876)
- December 28 — Du Xigui, naval officer (b. 1874)

=== Dates unknown ===
- Zhao Ti, general (b. 1871)
