= 1950 in China =

- Decades: 1930s; 1940s; 1950s; 1960s; 1970s
- See also: Other events of 1950; History of China • Timeline • Years

Events in the year 1950 in the People's Republic of China.

== Incumbents ==
- Chairman of the Chinese Communist Party – Mao Zedong
- Chairman of the Government – Mao Zedong
- Vice Chairmen of the Government – Zhu De Liu Shaoqi, Song Qingling, Li Jishen, Zhang Lan, Gao Gang
- Premier – Zhou Enlai
- Vice Premiers – Dong Biwu, Chen Yun, Guo Moruo, Huang Yanpei

=== Governors ===
- Governor of Fujian Province – Zhang Dingcheng
- Governor of Gansu Province – Deng Baoshan
- Governor of Guangdong Province – Ye Jianying
- Governor of Guizhou Province – Yang Yong
- Governor of Hebei Province – Yang Xiufeng
- Governor of Heilongjiang Province – Yu Yifu
- Governor of Henan Province – Wu Zhipu
- Governor of Hubei Province – Li Xiannian
- Governor of Hunan Province – Wang Shoudao
- Governor of Jiangsu Province – Tan Zhenlin
- Governor of Jiangxi Province – Shao Shiping
- Governor of Jilin Province – Zhou Chiheng
- Governor of Qinghai Province – Zhao Shoushan
- Governor of Shaanxi Province – Ma Mingfang
- Governor of Shandong Province – Kang Sheng
- Governor of Shanxi Province – Pei Lisheng
- Governor of Yunnan Province – Chen Geng
- Governor of Zhejiang Province – Tan Zhenlin

== Events ==
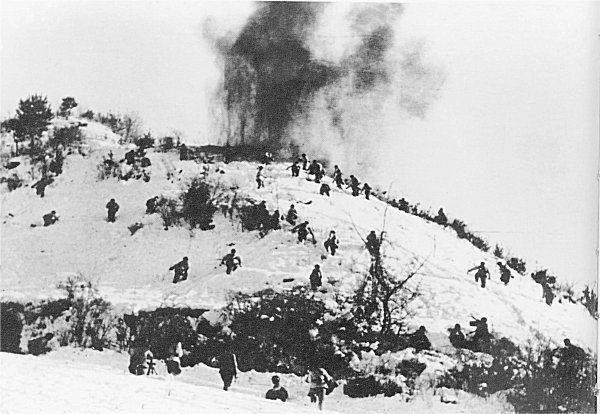
Battle of the Ch'ongch'on River: Chinese forces swarm a UN position.

- January 6 — The United Kingdom recognizes the People's Republic of China; the Republic of China severs diplomatic relations with Britain in response.
- January 9 — The Israeli government recognizes the People's Republic of China.
- January 13 — Finland forms diplomatic relations with the People's Republic of China.
- January 16 — Vietnam concluded diplomatic relations with Mainland China.
- January 31 — The last Kuomintang troops surrender in mainland China.
- February 14 — Cold War: The Soviet Union and the People's Republic of China sign a mutual defense treaty.
- March 5 - May 1 — Chinese Civil War: Landing Operation on Hainan Island – a series of battles fought in the Chinese province of Hainan between the nationalists and the communists during Chinese Civil War which resulted in the communist victory.
- October 7 — Invasion of Tibet: 40,000 troops of the People's Liberation Army invaded the Tibetan area of Chamdo. The large number of units of the PLA quickly surrounded the outnumbered Tibetan forces. By October 19, 1950, the 5,000 Tibetan troops had surrendered.
- November 25 — Korean War: Forces from the People's Republic of China commenced the Second Phase Campaign. The resulting battles at Ch'ongch'on River and Chosin Reservoir expelled the United Nations forces from North Korea.
- Contemporary optics began in China when the Chinese Academy of Sciences (CAS) established an Instrument Centre in 1950; this later became the Institute of Fine Optics and Mechanics.

== Births ==
=== January ===
- January 19 — Siqin Gaowa, actress

=== February ===
- February 27 — Zhang Baoshun, 15th Secretary of the Anhui Provincial Committee of the Chinese Communist Party

=== March ===
- March 29 — Xu Qiliang, 10th Commander of the People's Liberation Army Air Force (d. 2025)

=== April ===
- April 2 — Zhang Yimou, filmmaker
- April 15 — Sun Liqun, historian (d. 2020)
- April 19 — Yuen Qiu, Hong Kong actress and martial artist

=== May ===
- May 1 — Yang Jiechi, 10th Minister of Foreign Affairs
- May 13 — Peter Lai, Hong Kong lyricist and actor
- May 24 — Sun Chunlan, former Vice Premier of China

=== July ===
- July 3 — Zhang Kangkang, writer
- July 13 — Ma Ying-jeou, Taiwanese politician and lawyer
- July 14 — Chungsen Leung, Taiwanese-born Canadian businessman and politician
- Zhang Youxia, general in the People's Liberation Army

=== August ===
- August 23 — Alan Tam, Hong Kong singer and actor
- August 30 — Li Zhanshu, 10th Chairman of the Standing Committee of the National People's Congress

=== October ===
- October 10 — Choy So-yuk, Hong Kong politician
- October 12
  - Chen Shui-bian, Taiwanese former politician and lawyer
  - Lowell Lo, Hong Kong singer, songwriter, actor and film composer
- October 16 — Norman Chui, Hong Kong actor (d. 2024)
- October 18 — Terry Gou, Taiwanese billionaire businessman and politician
- October 30 — Liu Xiaoqing, actress and businesswoman

=== November ===
- November 19 — Jiang Kun, comedian
- November 20 — Li Yuanchao, 9th Vice President of China

== Deaths ==
- February 19 — Fang Zong'ao, late Qing dynasty scholar, economist and jurist (b. 1884)
- February 28 — Dai Wangshu, poet, essayist and translator (b. 1905)
- May 24 — Yan Huiqing, diplomat and politician (b. 1877)
- June 10 — Zhu Feng, communist intelligence agent (b. 1905)
- June 18 — Chen Yi, 1st Commander of the Taiwan Garrison Command (b. 1883)
- October 27 — Ren Bishi, leading figure in the Chinese Communist Party (b. 1904)
- November 25 — Mao Anying, military officer and eldest son of Mao Zedong and Yang Kaihui (b. 1922)
- November 29
  - Ma Zhanshan, general famous for resisting the Japanese invasion of Manchuria (b. 1885)
  - Yang Gensi, PVA military hero (b. 1922)
- December 4 — Abing, musician (b. 1893)
- December 20 — Fu Ssu-nien, historian, linguist and writer (b. 1896)

== See also ==
- 1950 in Chinese film
