= 1951 in China =

- Decades: 1930s; 1940s; 1950s; 1960s; 1970s
- See also: Other events of 1951; History of China • Timeline • Years

Events in the year 1951 in China.

== Incumbents ==
- Chairman of the Chinese Communist Party – Mao Zedong
- Chairman of the Government – Mao Zedong
- Vice Chairmen of the Government – Zhu De Liu Shaoqi, Song Qingling, Li Jishen, Zhang Lan, Gao Gang
- Premier – Zhou Enlai
- Vice Premiers – Dong Biwu, Chen Yun, Guo Moruo, Huang Yanpei

=== Governors ===
- Governor of Fujian Province – Zhang Dingcheng
- Governor of Gansu Province – Deng Baoshan
- Governor of Guangdong Province – Ye Jianying
- Governor of Guizhou Province – Yang Yong
- Governor of Hebei Province – Yang Xiufeng
- Governor of Heilongjiang Province – Yu Yifu
- Governor of Henan Province – Wu Zhipu
- Governor of Hubei Province – Li Xiannian
- Governor of Hunan Province – Wang Shoudao
- Governor of Jiangsu Province – Tan Zhenlin
- Governor of Jiangxi Province – Shao Shiping
- Governor of Jilin Province – Zhou Chiheng
- Governor of Qinghai Province – Zhao Shoushan
- Governor of Shaanxi Province – Ma Mingfang
- Governor of Shandong Province – Kang Sheng
- Governor of Shanxi Province – Pei Lisheng then Lai Ruoyu
- Governor of Yunnan Province – Chen Geng
- Governor of Zhejiang Province – Tan Zhenlin

== Events ==
- January 4 — Korean War: Chinese and North Korean forces capture Seoul.
- February 1 — Korean War: The United Nations General Assembly declares that the People's Republic of China is an aggressor in the Korean War in United Nations General Assembly Resolution 498.
- April 23–June 10 — Korean War: Chinese and North Korean forces launch the Fifth Phase Campaign. The resulting Chinese defeat at Seoul and Soyang River brought the Communists side to the armistice negotiation.
- May 23 — The Tibetan government signs the Seventeen Point Agreement for the Peaceful Liberation of Tibet with the People's Republic of China.
- September 9 — Chinese communist forces move into Lhasa, the capital of Tibet.

== Births ==
=== January ===
- January 4 — Shi Tiesheng, novelist (d. 2010)
- January 23 — Wang Shi, businessman

=== February ===
- February 10 — Zhang Qingli, former Vice Chairman of the Chinese People's Political Consultative Conference

=== March ===
- March 8 — Ren Zhiqiang, real estate tycoon

=== April ===
- April 28 — Newton Lai, Hong Kong film and television actor (d. 2013)

=== May ===
- May 13 — Li Hongzhi, founder and leader of Falun Gong
- May 22 — Kent Cheng, Hong Kong film and television actor
- May 23 — Zhang Jizhong, film producer, director, teacher and writer

=== October ===
- October 10 — Lam Po-chuen, voice actor (d. 2015)
- October 30 — Liu Xiaoqing, Chinese actress and businesswoman
- Padma Choling, 11th Chairman of Tibet

== Deaths ==
- January 30 — Jin Yunpeng, general and politician during the Warlord Era (b. 1877)
- February 3 — Zaifeng, Prince Regent of the Qing Dynasty (b. 1883)
- February 5 — Li Yutang, prominent member of the Hong Kong branch of the Tongmenghui (b. 1899)
- February 23 — Chang Po-ling, educator (b. 1876)
- April 29 — Osman Batur, Nationalist Kazakh military leader (b. 1899)
- June 22 — Gao Jianfu, artist (b. 1879)
- August 16 — Du Yuesheng, mob gangster (b. 1888)
- August 25 — Chen Guofu, former Nationalist Governor of Jiangsu (b. 1892)
- November 23 — Ju Zheng, nationalist politician (b. 1876)

== See also ==
- 1951 in Chinese film
