= 1953 in China =

- Decades: 1930s; 1940s; 1950s; 1960s; 1970s
- See also: Other events of 1953; History of China • Timeline • Years

Events in the year 1953 in China.

CALAMITY DAMAGE AND CROP DATA, APRIL-OCTOBER 1953, EXTRACTED FROM CHINESE COMMUNIST PRESS (CIA, 1954)

== Incumbents ==
- Chairman of the Chinese Communist Party – Mao Zedong
- Chairman of the Government – Mao Zedong
- Vice Chairmen of the Government – Zhu De Liu Shaoqi, Song Qingling, Li Jishen, Zhang Lan, Gao Gang
- Premier – Zhou Enlai
- Vice Premiers – Dong Biwu, Chen Yun, Guo Moruo, Huang Yanpei, Deng Xiaoping

=== Governors ===
- Governor of Anhui Province – Zeng Xisheng
- Governor of Fujian Province – Zhang Dingcheng
- Governor of Gansu Province – Deng Baoshan
- Governor of Guangdong Province – Ye Jianying (until September), Tao Zhu (starting September)
- Governor of Guizhou Province – Yang Yong
- Governor of Hebei Province – Yang Xiufeng
- Governor of Heilongjiang Province – Zhao Dezun then Chen Lei
- Governor of Henan Province – Wu Zhipu
- Governor of Hubei Province – Li Xiannian
- Governor of Hunan Province – Cheng Qian
- Governor of Jiangsu Province – Tan Zhenlin
- Governor of Jiangxi Province – Shao Shiping
- Governor of Jilin Province – Li Youwen
- Governor of Liaoning Province – Du Zheheng
- Governor of Qinghai Province – Zhang Zhongliang
- Governor of Shaanxi Province – Zhao Shoushan
- Governor of Shandong Province – Kang Sheng
- Governor of Shanxi Province – Pei Lisheng
- Governor of Sichuan Province – Li Jingquan
- Governor of Yunnan Province – Chen Geng
- Governor of Zhejiang Province – Tan Zhenlin

== Events ==
- July 15 – FAW Group (First Automobile Group) was founded.
- July 27 – The Korean War ends: United Nations Command (Korea) (United States), People's Republic of China, North Korea sign an armistice agreement.
- September 5 – The United Nations rejects the Soviet Union's suggestion to accept the People's Republic of China as a member.

== Births ==
=== January ===
- January 29 — Teresa Teng, Taiwanese singer and actress (d. 1995)
- January 30 — Liu Qibao, member of the 18th Politburo of the Chinese Communist Party
- Zhu Xiaodan, 16th Governor of Guangdong

=== February ===
- February 18 — Charles Xue, Chinese-American entrepreneur and angel investor
- February 20 — Jenny Tseng, singer
- February 22 — Blackie Ko, Taiwanese film director, producer, stuntman, singer and actor (d. 2003)
- February 23 — Kenny Bee, Hong Kong singer, musician and actor
- February 26 — Lin Ching-hsuan, Taiwanese essayist (d. 2019)

=== April ===
- April 3 — Shi Shengjie, xiangsheng comedian (d. 2018)
- April 4 — Chen Yi, Chinese violinist and composer of contemporary classical music
- April 14 — Eric Tsang, Hong Kong actor, film director, producer and television host
- April 21 — Terry Hu, Taiwanese actress, writer and translator

=== May ===
- May 12 — Zhang Chunxian, 9th Secretary of the Xinjiang Uyghur Autonomous Regional Committee of the Chinese Communist Party
- Gao Hongbin, official (d. 2024)

=== June ===
- June 15 — Xi Jinping, CCP General Secretary and 6th paramount leader of China

=== July ===
- July 8 — Zhou Long, Pulitzer-prize-winning Chinese American composer
- July 21 — Sylvia Chang, Taiwanese actress, singer director, screenwriter and producer
- July 31 — Pu Cunxin, actor

=== August ===
- August 9 — Nur Bekri, 10th Chairman of the Xinjiang Uyghur Autonomous Region
- August 11 — Qian Gang, non-fiction writer and journalist
- August 20 — Fong Fei-fei, Taiwanese singer, host and actress (d. 2012)
- August 21 — Lu Qi, actor
- Shohrat Zakir, 11th Chairman of the Xinjiang Uyghur Autonomous Region

=== September ===
- September 16 — Chen Xi, 21st President of the Central Party School of the Chinese Communist Party
- September 26 — Bai Chunli, physical chemist, nanotechnology scientist and academic administrator

=== October ===
- October 1 — Han Sanping, film producer and distributor
- October 4 — Wu Jianping, computer scientist
- October 19 — Wang Yi, 11th & 13th Minister of Foreign Affairs of China
- October 26 — Yang Xiaodu, 1st Director of the National Supervisory Commission
- Wu Weiren, physicist

=== November ===
- November 6 — Guan Mucun, mezzo-soprano singer
- Yang Xiong, 14th Mayor of Shanghai (d. 2021)

=== December ===
- December 6 — Susanna Au-yeung, Hong Kong actress (d. 2017)
- December 7 — Tao Zeru, film and television actor
- December 28 — Zhao Kezhi, former State Councilor of China
- Yang Jing, 9th Chairman of the Inner Mongolia Autonomous Region

=== Unknown dates ===
- Jing Jing Luo, composer

== Deaths ==
- June 20 — Huang Jinrong, chief detective who worked for the French Concession police force in Shanghai (b. 1868)
- July 8 — Du Xinwu, martial artist (b. 1869)
- July 10 — Wu Qiwei, military commander (b. 1891)
- September 17 — Wenxiu, consort of China's last emperor Puyi (b. 1909)
- September 26 — Xu Beihong, painter (b. 1895)
- October 30 — Wu Zhihui, linguist and philosopher (b. 1865)
- November 19 — Wu Tiecheng, nationalist politician (b. 1888)

== See also ==
- 1953 in Chinese film
