= 1954 in China =

- Decades: 1930s; 1940s; 1950s; 1960s; 1970s
- See also: Other events of 1954; History of China • Timeline • Years

Events in the year 1954 in China.

== Incumbents ==
- Chairman of the Chinese Communist Party: Mao Zedong
- President of the People's Republic of China: Mao Zedong
- Premier of the People's Republic of China: Zhou Enlai
- Chairman of the National People's Congress: Liu Shaoqi
- Vice President of the People's Republic of China: Zhu De (starting September 27)
- Vice Premier of the People's Republic of China: Dong Biwu (until September 15), Chen Yun (starting September 15)

=== Governors ===
- Governor of Anhui Province: Zeng Xisheng
- Governor of Fujian Province: Zhang Dingcheng then Ye Fei
- Governor of Gansu Province: Deng Baoshan
- Governor of Guangdong Province: Tao Zhu
- Governor of Guizhou Province: Yang Yong (until unknown)
- Governor of Hebei Province: Yang Xiufeng then Lin Tie
- Governor of Heilongjiang Province: Chen Lei then Han Guang
- Governor of Henan Province: Wu Zhipu
- Governor of Hubei Province: Li Xiannian then Liu Zihou
- Governor of Hunan Province: Cheng Qian
- Governor of Jiangsu Province: Tan Zhenlin
- Governor of Jiangxi Province: Shao Shiping
- Governor of Jilin Province: Li Youwen
- Governor of Liaoning Province: Du Zheheng (starting August)
- Governor of Qinghai Province: Zhang Zhongliang then Sun Zuobin
- Governor of Shaanxi Province: Zhao Shoushan
- Governor of Shandong Province: Kang Sheng
- Governor of Shanxi Province: Pei Lisheng
- Governor of Sichuan Province: Li Jingquan
- Governor of Yunnan Province: Chen Geng
- Governor of Zhejiang Province: Tan Zhenlin

== Events ==
- January 1 — The First five-year plan began, this would be the basis of the rest of the 5 Year Plans later introuduced through the Peoples Republic of China.
- September 20 — The first meeting of the National People's Congress in Beijing unanimously approved the 1954 Constitution of the People's Republic of China, the first constitution in the PRC since the state's founding
- June 30 — The 1953 Chinese Census started which was the official national census in Modern Chinese History.
- October 1 — The China Construction Bank was founded.

=== Other ===
- In 1954, the All-China Federation of Trade Unions began a nationwide technological innovation movement. Emphasizing workers' contributions to technology, it called for learning from the Soviet experience while "giving full play to the talents and wisdom of the laboring masses."
- Fuzhou Battery Factory, as predecessor of Nanfu Battery was founded in Fujian Province.

== Births ==
=== January ===
- January 9 — Cao Wenxuan, novelist
- January 23 — You Quan, 12th Secretary of the Fujian Provincial Committee of the Chinese Communist Party

=== February ===
- February 1 — Chen Peisi, sketch comedian, film and stage actor and voice actor
- February 18 — Maria Cordero, Macanese singer, actress, TV host and DJ
- February 20 — Li Xuejian, actor
- Wei Fenghe, 12th Minister of National Defense
- Xue Yanzhong, politician

=== March ===
- March 16 — Ma Ju-feng, Taiwanese actor (d. 2018)
- March 28 — Zhu Shimao, comedian, sketch actor and actor

=== April ===
- April 7 — Jackie Chan, Hong Kong actor, director, writer, producer, martial artist and stuntman
- April 22 — Han Zheng, 11th Vice President of China

=== May ===
- May 15 — Yang Chuantang, 12th Minister of Transport
- Yin Qing, composer

=== June ===
- June 14 — Huang Jianxin, filmmaker

=== July ===
- July 3 — Billy Lau, Hong Kong film actor
- July 4 — Ba Ge, Taiwanese actor and television host (d. 2022)
- July 20 — Lo Ta-yu, Taiwanese singer and songwriter
- Zhao Yupei, surgeon and politician

=== August ===
- August 12 — Leung Chun-ying, 3rd Chief Executive of Hong Kong

=== September ===
- September 22 — Jiang Dingzhi, 7th Governor of Hainan
- September 23 — Du Xian, news anchor, journalist and professor
- Liu Yuejun, general of the People's Liberation Army

=== October ===
- October 5 — Luo Huining, 15th Secretary of the Qinghai Provincial Committee of the Chinese Communist Party
- October 10 — Han Changfu, politician
- October 16 — Guo Shengkun, politician and business executive
- October 20 — Alexander Fu Sheng, Hong Kong martial arts actor (d. 1983)
- October 23 — Ang Lee, Taiwanese actor
- October 24 — Wang Jianlin, business magnate, investor and philanthropist
- Huang Xingguo, 15th Mayor of Tianjin

=== November ===
- November 3 — Brigitte Lin, Taiwanese actress
- November 4 — Pan Hong, film actress
- Feng Xiaoning, film director, screenwriter and cinematographer

=== December ===
- December 9 — Li Xiuming, film actress
- December 18 — Jiang Lili, actress

=== Dates unknown ===
- Batdorj-in Baasanjab, actor of Mongol descent

== Deaths ==
- January 3 — Yu Yan, physician and writer (b. 1879)
- April 2 — Liang Siyong, anthropologist and archaeologist (b. 1904)
- June 3 — Wang Yaoqing, actor and singer (b. 1881)
- June 29 — Tang Enbo, nationalist general (b. 1898)
- August 17 — Gao Gang, 1st Chairman of the State Planning Commission of the People's Republic of China (b. 1905)
- November 3 — Chen Jitang, nationalist military officer (b. 1890)

=== Dates unknown ===
- Ma Hushan, Chinese Muslim general of the Ma clique (b. 1910)

== See also ==
- 1954 in Chinese film
