= 1882 in China =

- Decades: 1860s; 1870s; 1880s; 1890s; 1900s
- See also: Other events of 1882; History of China • Timeline • Years

Events from the year 1882 in China.

== Incumbents ==
- Guangxu Emperor (8th year)
  - Regent: Empress Dowager Cixi (22nd year)

=== Viceroys ===
- Viceroy of Zhili — Li Hongzhang then Zhang Shusheng
- Viceroy of Min-Zhe — He Jing
- Viceroy of Huguang — Li Hanzhang then Tu Zongying
- Viceroy of Shaan-Gan — Tan Zhonglin
- Viceroy of Liangguang — Zhang Shusheng then Yukuan then Zeng Guoquan
- Viceroy of Yun-Gui — Liu Changyou then Cen Yuying
- Viceroy of Sichuan — Ding Baozhen
- Viceroy of Liangjiang — Zuo Zongtang

== Events ==
- China–Korea Treaty of 1882
