= 1948 in China =

- Decades: 1920s; 1930s; 1940s; 1950s; 1960s
- See also: Other events of 1948; History of China • Timeline • Years

Events in the year 1948 in China.

== Incumbents ==
- President: Chiang Kai-shek
- Vice President: Li Zongren
- Premier: Zhang Qun
- Vice Premier: Wang Yunwu (until April 24)

== Events ==
=== April ===
- 20 April – 1948 Republic of China presidential election

=== May ===
- 23 May to 19 October – Siege of Changchun

=== June ===
- 17–19 June - Battle of Shangcai

=== September ===
- 12 September to 2 November – Liaoshen Campaign
- 16–24 September – Battle of Jinan

=== October ===
- 7–15 October – Battle of Jinzhou
- 10–15 October – Battle of Tashan

=== November ===
- Early November – Boiler and ammunition explosion aboard an unidentified merchant ship evacuating troops of the Republic of China Army from Yingkou for Taiwan.

=== December ===
- 1 December – The People's Bank of China was established in Shijiazhuang, this financial service was transferred to Beijing in 1949.

== Births ==
=== January ===
- 30 January – Wu Den-yih, Vice President of the Republic of China.

=== March ===
- 9 March – Chang Jin-fu, former Governor of Taiwan Province.

=== April ===
- 7 April – Hung Hsiu-chu, Vice President of Legislative Yuan.

=== May ===
- 5 May – Jeffrey Tao, interpreter.

=== October ===
- 4 October – Mao Chi-kuo, former Premier of the Republic of China.

== Deaths ==
- February 18 — Xu Shoushang, writer and one of the co-authors of the Twelve Symbols national emblem (b. 1883)
- February 28 — Zhou Fohai, politician (b. 1897)
- March 3 — Liu Kan, nationalist general (b. 1906)
- March 25 — Yoshiko Kawashima, Qing Dynasty royal of the Aisin-Gioro clan (b. 1907)
- May 23 — Kong Xianrong, Jilin Provincial Army battalion commander (b. 1881)
- May 25 — Dong Cunrui, soldier in the People's Liberation Army (b. 1929)
- August 12 — Zhu Ziqing, poet and essayist (b. 1898)
- September 1 — Feng Yuxiang, warlord and 1st Minister of War of the Republic of China (b. 1882)
- November 22 — Huang Baitao, nationalist general (b. 1900)
- December 27 — Lu Zhiying, intelligence officer of the Chinese Communist Party (b. 1906)

== See also ==
- List of Chinese films of the 1940s
