= 1884 in China =

- Decades: 1860s; 1870s; 1880s; 1890s; 1900s
- See also: Other events of 1884; History of China • Timeline • Years

Events in the year 1884 in China.

== Incumbents ==
- Guangxu Emperor (10th year)
  - Regent: Empress Dowager Cixi

=== Viceroys ===
- Viceroy of Zhili — Li Hongzhang
- Viceroy of Min-Zhe — He Jing then Yang Changjun
- Viceroy of Huguang — Bian Baodi
- Viceroy of Shaan-Gan — Tan Zhonglin
- Viceroy of Liangguang — Zhang Shusheng then Zhang Zhidong
- Viceroy of Yun-Gui — Cen Yuying
- Viceroy of Sichuan — Ding Baozhen
- Viceroy of Liangjiang — Zuo Zongtang then Yulu then Zeng Guoquan

== Events ==
- Sino-French War
  - March 6–24 - Bắc Ninh Campaign
  - May 11 - Tientsin Accord
  - June 23–24 - Bắc Lệ ambush
  - August 23–26 - Battle of Fuzhou
  - October 2–15 - Kep Campaign
  - November 19 - Battle of Yu Oc
- Xinjiang province (Sinkang) established

== Births ==
- February 20 - Yang Sen (1884-1977)
- Fang Junying (1884–1923), Revolutionary Tongmenghui member
- Zhu Weiju (1884–1951), modern physician

== Deaths ==
- Zhang Shusheng
