= 1928 in China =

- Decades: 1900s; 1910s; 1920s; 1930s; 1940s
- See also: Other events of 1928; History of China • Timeline • Years

Events in the year 1928 in China.

== Incumbents ==
- President – Zhang Zuolin, Tan Yankai, Chiang Kai-shek
- Premier – Pan Fu, Tan Yankai
- Vice Premier – Feng Yuxiang

== Events ==
=== February ===
- 7 February – Tan Yankai became the first Chairman of the Nationalist Government.

=== March ===
- 26 March – The China Academy of Art is founded in Hangzhou (originally named the National Academy of Art).

=== April ===
- 30 April – Beiyang government troops withdrew from Jinan.

=== May ===
- 3 May – Jinan Incident, an armed conflict between the Japanese Imperial Army allied with Northern Chinese warlords against the Kuomintang's southern army, occurs in Jinan.

=== June ===
- 4 June – Huanggutun Incident (Japanese assassination of the Chinese head of state Generalissimo Zhang Zuolin).

=== July ===
- 1 July – Zhang Xueliang announced an armistice with the Kuomintang and proclaimed that he would not interfere with the re-unification.
- 3 July – Chiang Kai-shek arrived in Beijing and met the representative from the Fengtian clique to discuss a peaceful settlement.
- 8 July – Looting of the Eastern Mausoleum.
- 25 July – The United States recalls its troops from China.

=== October ===
- 8 October – Chiang Kai-shek is named as Generalissimo (Chairman of the Military Affairs Commission) of the Nationalist government of the Republic of China.

=== December ===
- 29 December – Chinese reunification.

== Births ==
=== January ===
- 1 January — Wu Yangjie, organic chemist
- 2 January — Nie Bichu, 11th Mayor of Tianjin (d. 2018)
- 5 January — Qian Qichen, 7th Minister of Foreign Affairs of China (d. 2017)

=== February ===
- 3 February — Hou Feng, plant breeding engineer (d. 2020)
- 12 February — Wang Yeping, spouse of the 4th Paramount Leader Jiang Zemin
- 17 February — Zhang Shourong, metallurgist (d. 2024)
- 23 February — Zhang Cunhao, physical chemist (d. 2024)

=== March ===
- 7 March — Lee Shau-kee, Hong Kong business magnate, investor and philanthropist
- 11 March — Zhao Lirong, singer and film actress (d. 2000)
- 19 March — Sutano Djuhar, Indonesian Chinese businessman, investor and philanthropist (d. 2018)

=== July ===
- 26 July — Zong Pu, novelist
- 28 July — Ng Teng Fong, Singaporean real estate tycoon (d. 2010)
- 29 July — Li Ka-shing, Hong Kong billionaire business magnate, investor and philanthropist
- Zhao Baotong, MiG-15 pilot (d. 2003)

=== August ===
- 1 August
  - Zhang Wannian, general of the People's Liberation Army (d. 2015)
  - Shen Daren, 7th Secretary of the Jiangsu Provincial Committee of the Chinese Communist Party (d. 2017)
- 18 August — John Liu Shi-gong, Roman Catholic bishop (d. 2017)

=== October ===
- 20 October — Li Peng, 4th Premier of China (d. 2019)
- 21 October — Yu Kwang-chung, Taiwanese writer, poet, educator and critic (d. 2017)
- 23 October — Zhu Rongji, 5th Premier of China

=== November ===
- 5 November — Gyalo Thondup, Tibetan politician (d. 2025)

=== Dates unknown ===
- Sun Shenlu, pilot of the People's Liberation Army Air Force (d. 1952)

== Deaths ==
- 21 March — Zhang Shaozeng, 15th Premier of the Republic of China (b. 1879)
- 30 March — Xia Minghan, early leader of the Chinese Communist Revolution (b. 1900)
- 30 April — Gu Hongming, British Malaya born Chinese man of letters (b. 1857)
- 1 May — Xiang Jingyu, pioneer of the women's movement of China (b. 1895)
- 3 May — Cai Gongshi, nationalist politician and diplomat (b. 1881)
- 3 June — Li Yuanhong, 2nd President of the Republic of China (b. 1864)
- 4 June — Huanggutun incident
  - Zhang Zuolin, warlord of Manchuria and leader of the Fengtian clique (b. 1875)
  - Wu Junsheng, general and commander-in-chief of the cavalry in the Northeastern Army (b. 1863)
- 6 June — Chen Qiaonian, revolutionary and early leader of the Chinese Communist Party (b. 1902)
- 7 July — Yang Zengxin, 1st Governor of Xinjiang (b. 1864)
- 30 September — Shi Pingmei, writer (b. 1902)
- 14 October — Chen Jue, communist revolutionary (b. 1903)
- 6 November — Lu Rongting, warlord and head of the Old Guangxi clique (b. 1859)

== Bibliography ==
- Beasley, W.G. (1991). Japanese Imperialism 1894–1945. Oxford University Press. ISBN 0-19-822168-1.
- Akira Iriye, After Imperialism: The Search for a New Order in the Far East, 1921–1931 (Cambridge: Harvard University Press, 1965; reprinted:Chicago: Imprint Publications, 1990): 193–205.
