= 1868 in China =

- Decades: 1840s; 1850s; 1860s; 1870s; 1880s
- See also: Other events of 1868; History of China • Timeline • Years

Events from the year 1868 in China.

== Incumbents ==
- Tongzhi Emperor (8th year)
  - Regent: Empress Dowager Cixi

== Events ==
- Yangzhou riot
- Burlingame Treaty, also known as the Burlingame-Seward Treaty of 1868, was a landmark treaty between the United States and Qing China, amending the Treaty of Tientsin, one of the unequal treaties, to establish formal friendly relations between the two nations, with the United States granting China the status of most favored nation in trade
- Nian Rebellion ends
  - Remnants of resistance crushed by the combined forces of the government's troops and the Ever Victorious Army.
- Miao Rebellion (1854–73)
- Dungan Revolt (1862–77)
- Panthay Rebellion
- Tongzhi Restoration

== Births ==
- Huo Yuanjia in the Jinghai District
- Cai Yuanpei in Shaoxing
- Zhang Binglin in the Yuhang District
- Lu Haodong in Shanghai
- Huang Jinrong in Suzhou
- Lin Sen in Minhou County
- An Disheng in Xianghe County

== Deaths ==
- Lai Wenguang in Yangzhou
