= 1875 in China =

- Decades: 1850s; 1860s; 1870s; 1880s; 1890s
- See also: Other events of 1875; History of China • Timeline • Years

Events from the year 1875 in China.

== Incumbents ==
- Tongzhi Emperor (15th year)
  - Regent: Empress Dowager Cixi
- Guangxu Emperor (1st year)

== Events ==
- Tongzhi Emperor dies without an heir, Empress Dowager Cixi selects her three-year-old nephew Zaitian as the Guangxu Emperor to succeed him
- Dungan Revolt (1862–77)
- February 21 — Margary Affair British explorer Augustus Raymond Margary and his entire staff murdered in Yunnan
- 60 to 70 Christian women in Amoy attended a meeting presided by a missionary John MacGowan formed the Heavenly Foot Society (tianzu literally meaning Heavenly Foot), opposing the practice of footbinding
- American trading company Augustine Heard & Co. becomes bankrupt

== Births ==
- Gao Enhong
- Wang Shoupeng
- Rong Desheng
- Yu Baoxuan
- Du Xigui
- Lin Xu

== Deaths ==
- Empress Xiaozheyi
- Ding Yan
- 12 January — Tongzhi Emperor
