= 1880 in China =

- Decades: 1860s; 1870s; 1880s; 1890s; 1900s
- See also: Other events of 1880; History of China • Timeline • Years

A list of historical events that took place in China in the year 1880.

== Incumbents ==
- Guangxu Emperor (6th year)
  - Regent: Empress Dowager Cixi

=== Viceroys ===
- Viceroy of Zhili — Li Hongzhang
- Viceroy of Min-Zhe — He Jing (何璟)
- Viceroy of Huguang — Li Hanzhang
- Viceroy of Shaan-Gan
  - Zuo Zongtang
  - Yang Changjun
- Viceroy of Liangguang
  - Yukuan (裕寬) – through 20 May 1880 (acting)
  - Zhang Shusheng
- Viceroy of Yun-Gui — Liu Changyou
- Viceroy of Sichuan — Ding Baozhen

== Events ==
- Muslim women are forbidden to marry non-Muslims in Islamic law

== Establishments ==
- Chefoo School

== Births ==
- Chen Yuan (historian), (1880–1971), historian and educator who actively promoted the overthrow of the Manchu Qing dynasty
- He Peirong (何佩瑢; 1880 – 1942) was a military personnel and politician in the Republic of China. He belonged to the Beijing Government, Anhui clique.
- Bin Bucheng (賓步程; 1880- 1943) politician and educator, became the President of Hunan University
- Wan Fulin (Wan Fulin (Chinese: 万福麟; 1880–1951) the military governor of Heilongjiang province from 1928 and part of the Fengtian clique
- Zhu Xingyuan (Chinese: 祝惺元; born 1880-1945?) was a politician and diplomat in the Republic of China. He was an important politician during the Provisional Government of the Republic of China and the Wang Jingwei regime
- Jia Deyao (賈德耀; 1880–1940) was a Chinese military commander and politician, member of the Anhui clique during the Beiyang Government.
- Leong Sin Nam 梁燊南(1880–1940) was a Malaysian businessman

== Deaths ==
- Ng Akew, Chinese opium smuggler and house owner in Hong Kong
