= 1874 in China =

- Decades: 1850s; 1860s; 1870s; 1880s; 1890s
- See also: Other events of 1874; History of China • Timeline • Years

Events from the year 1874 in China.

== Incumbents ==
- Tongzhi Emperor (14th year)
  - Regent: Empress Dowager Cixi

== Events ==
- end of the Tongzhi Restoration
- Dungan Revolt (1862–77)
- Japanese invasion of Taiwan (1874)

== Births ==
- Shen Shou (Chinese: 沈壽; 1874–1921) a Chinese embroiderer during the late Qing and early Republican period
- Feng Guifen (Chinese: 馮桂芬; pinyin: Féng Guìfēn; 1809 – May 28, 1874, courtesy name Linyi (Chinese: 林一; pinyin: Línyī) was a scholar during the Qing dynasty and was a strong contributor to the philosophy of the Self-Strengthening Movement undertaken in the late 19th century
- Shen Hongying (simplified Chinese: 沈鸿英; traditional Chinese: 沈鴻英; pinyin: Shěn Hóngyīng) (1871–1938) was a Chinese general in the Old Guangxi Clique
- Tang Hualong (1874 – September 1, 1918), was the education minister from 1914 to 1915 and the interior minister in 1917 in the Republic of China.[1]
- Tan Kah Kee (21 October 1874 – 12 August 1961), also known as Chen Jiageng, was a Chinese businessman, community leader and philanthropist active in Southeast Asia, Hong Kong, and various Chinese cities such as Shanghai, Xiamen, and Guangzhou
- Wang Zhongsheng (1874? – 2 December 1911) was a Qing dynasty dramatist, official, and revolutionary. He founded the Spring Sun Society, one of China's earliest troupes dedicated to the performance of the modern spoken drama, which came from the west and differed considerably from the traditional Chinese theatre, or Chinese opera.
- Wang Chengbin (Chinese: 王承斌) (August 21, 1874 – February 15, 1936) was an ethnic Manchu Chinese general of the Warlord Era of the Republic of China
- Wu Peifu (吴佩孚, April 22, 1874 – December 4, 1939), a major figure in the struggles between the warlords who dominated Republican China from 1916 to 1927
- Khoo Sook Yuen (1874 – December 1941) was a Chinese-born Singaporean poet. He penned more than a thousand poems and is historically considered an important figure in Chinese language poetry.

== Deaths ==
- Yang Fuqing (alleged)
