= 1876 in China =

- Decades: 1850s; 1860s; 1870s; 1880s; 1890s
- See also: Other events of 1876; History of China • Timeline • Years

Events from the year 1876 in China.

== Incumbents ==
- Guangxu Emperor (2nd year)
  - Regent: Empress Dowager Cixi

=== Viceroys ===
- Viceroy of Zhili — Li Hongzhang
- Viceroy of Min-Zhe — Li Henian then Wenyu then He Jing
- Viceroy of Huguang — Li Hanzhang
- Viceroy of Shaan-Gan — Zuo Zongtang
- Viceroy of Liangguang — Liu Kunyi
- Viceroy of Yun-Gui — Liu Changyou
- Viceroy of Sichuan — Li Hanzhang then Ding Baozhen
- Viceroy of Liangjiang — Shen Baozhen

== Events ==
- Dungan Revolt (1862–77)
- Northern Chinese Famine of 1876–79
- Woosung Road constructed in Shanghai, Jiangsu
