= 1922 in China =

- Decades: 1900s; 1910s; 1920s; 1930s; 1940s
- See also: Other events of 1922; History of China • Timeline • Years

Events in the year 1922 in China.

== Incumbents ==
- President — Xu Shichang, Li Yuanhong
- Premier of the Republic of China — Liang Shiyi until January 25, Yan Huiqing until August 5, Wang Chonghui until November 29, Wang Daxie

== Events ==
- January 12 — 1922 seamen's strike, Chinese sailors from Hong Kong and Guangzhou went on strike for higher wages
- February 6 — The Nine Power Treaty is signed between Belgium, China, France, United Kingdom, Italy, Japan, the Netherlands, Portugal and the United Statesto affirm the sovereignty and territorial integrity of China and to solve the Shandong Problem. Japan returns some of its control over the Shandong Peninsula to China.
- April 10 – June 18 — First Zhili–Fengtian War
- June 16 — Chen Jiongming, warlord of Guangdong, launched a coup against Sun Yat-sen, Great President of the Government of the Republic of China in Guangzhou
- July 16–23 — The 2nd National Congress of the Chinese Communist Party is held in Shanghai
- August 2 — The 1922 Shantou typhoon hits Shantou in Guangdong Province, killing more than 5,000 people

== Births ==
- January 4 — Tian Jiaying, personal secretary of Mao Zedong (d. 1966)
- January 21 — Qin Yi, actress (d. 2022)
- January 23 — Jin Xueshu, physician and journalist (d. 2014)
- January 29 — Li Huatian, computer scientist (d. 2007)
- March 26 — Yuan Xuefen, Yue opera performer (d. 2011)
- April 27 — Shen Qihan, geologist (d. 2022)
- May 7 — Wu Liangyong, architect and urban planner
- August 1 — Guan Xuezeng, actor (d. 2006)
- August 11 — Wang Li, communist propagandist and prominent member of the Cultural Revolution Group (d. 1996)
- August 16 — Jiao Yulu, politician (d. 1964)
- August 31 — Wu Mengchao, surgeon and medical scientist (d. 2021)
- September 3 — Yao Tongbin, scientist and missile engineer (d. 1968)
- September 21 — Chiang Chung-ling, Taiwanese army general (d. 2015)
- October 1 — Yang Chen-Ning, theoretical physicist (d. 2025)
- October 24 — Mao Anying, military officer and eldest son of Mao Zedong (d. 1950)
- November 26 — Yang Gensi, military officer (d. 1950)
- December – Lu Yongfu, translator

== Deaths ==
- January 16 — Jiang Guiti, warlord of Rehe Province (b. 1844)
- March 29 — Shanqi, prince and minister of the Qing dynasty (b. 1866)
- June 23 — Wu Tingfang, calligrapher, diplomat, lawyer, politician and writer (b. 1842)

== See also ==
- Warlord Era
