= 1870 in China =

- Decades: 1850s; 1860s; 1870s; 1880s; 1890s
- See also: Other events of 1870; History of China • Timeline • Years

Events from the year 1870 in China.

== Incumbents ==
- Tongzhi Emperor (10th year)
  - Regent: Empress Dowager Cixi

== Events ==
- Miao Rebellion (1854–73)
- Dungan Revolt (1862–77)
  - Battle of Ürümqi (1870)
- June — Tianjin Massacre
- Panthay Rebellion
- Tongzhi Restoration

== Births ==
- Lim Lean Teng (林連登), Malaysian businessman
