= 1877 in China =

- Decades: 1850s; 1860s; 1870s; 1880s; 1890s
- See also: Other events of 1877; History of China • Timeline • Years

Events from the year 1877 in China.

== Incumbents ==
- Guangxu Emperor (3rd year)
  - Regent: Empress Dowager Cixi

=== Viceroys ===
- Viceroy of Zhili — Li Hongzhang
- Viceroy of Min-Zhe — He Jing
- Viceroy of Huguang — Li Hanzhang
- Viceroy of Shaan-Gan — Zuo Zongtang
- Viceroy of Liangguang — Liu Kunyi
- Viceroy of Yun-Gui — Liu Changyou
- Viceroy of Sichuan — Ding Baozhen
- Viceroy of Liangjiang — Shen Baozhen

== Events ==
- Dungan Revolt (1862–77)
- Northern Chinese Famine of 1876–79
  - Shandong Famine Relief Committee was established with the participation of diplomats, businessmen, and Protestant and Roman Catholic missionaries to combat the famine
- Woosung Road railway purchased and dismantled by Viceroy of Liangjiang Shen Baozhen

== Deaths ==
- Gu Taiqing (Chinese: 顾太清; Pinyin: Gù Tàiqīng; 1799 – c. 1877) writer and poet, one of the top-ranked women poets of the Qing Dynasty.
- Yaqub Beg, killed in the Qing reconquest of Xinjiang
