= Zheng Shuang =

Zheng Shuang may refer to:

- Zheng Shuang (artist) (born 1936), Chinese woodcut artist
- Zheng Shuang (actress, born 1966), Chinese actress
- Zheng Shuang (actress, born 1991), Chinese actress

== See also ==
- Zhang Shuang (disambiguation)
