= 1873 in China =

- Decades: 1850s; 1860s; 1870s; 1880s; 1890s
- See also: Other events of 1873; History of China • Timeline • Years

Events from the year 1873 in China.

== Incumbents ==
- Tongzhi Emperor (13th year)
- Regent: Empress Dowager Cixi

== Events ==
- Miao Rebellion (1854–73) ends
- Dungan Revolt (1862–77)
- Panthay Rebellion
- Genocide that reduced the population of Yunnan by at least 5 million
- Tongzhi Restoration

== Births ==
- 16 July - Cheong Yoke Choy (張郁才; 1873 – 1958) (Xinhui district, Jiangmen) philanthropist in British Malaya
- Chen Cuifen (陳粹芬; 1873–1960) regarded as the “Forgotten revolutionary female” and "The first revolution partner" of Sun Yat-sen.
