= Zhang Shuang =

Zhang Shuang may refer to:

- Zhang Shuang (speed skater) (born 1986), Chinese female speed skater
- Zhang Shuang (ice hockey) (born 1987), Chinese female ice hockey player

== See also ==
- Zheng Shuang (disambiguation)
