= 1881 in China =

- Decades: 1860s; 1870s; 1880s; 1890s; 1900s
- See also: Other events of 1881; History of China • Timeline • Years

The following lists events that happened during 1881 in China.

== Incumbents ==
- Guangxu Emperor (7th year)
  - Regent: Empress Dowager Cixi

=== Viceroys ===
- Viceroy of Zhili — Li Hongzhang
- Viceroy of Min-Zhe — He Jing
- Viceroy of Huguang — Li Hanzhang
- Viceroy of Shaan-Gan — Yang Changjun then Zeng Guoquan then Tan Zhonglin
- Viceroy of Liangguang — Zhang Shusheng
- Viceroy of Yun-Gui — Liu Changyou
- Viceroy of Sichuan — Ding Baozhen
- Viceroy of Liangjiang — Liu Kunyi then Peng Yulin then Zuo Zongtang

== Events ==
=== February ===
- February 24 - Zeng Jize and the Russian representative concluded the Treaty of Saint Petersburg.

=== July ===
- July 20 - earthquake of magnitude 6.5 occurred in Gansu and Lanzhou.

== Deaths ==
- April 8 - Empress Dowager Ci'an. (aged 43; Born on 12 August 1837)
