= 1866 in China =

- Decades: 1840s; 1850s; 1860s; 1870s; 1880s
- See also: Other events of 1866; History of China • Timeline • Years

Events from the year 1866 in China.

== Incumbents ==
- Tongzhi Emperor (6th year)
  - Regent: Empress Dowager Cixi

== Events ==
- Nian Rebellion
- Miao Rebellion (1854–73)
- Dungan Revolt (1862–77)
- Panthay Rebellion
- Tongzhi Restoration

== Births ==
- Luo Zhenyu or Lo Chen-yü (August 8, 1866 – May 14, 1940), courtesy name Shuyun (叔蘊), was a Chinese classical scholar, philologist, epigrapher, antiquarian and Qing loyalist.
- Sun Yat-sen (Zhongshan, Guangdong) Father of the Republic of China
- Chung Wing Kwong, revolutionary
