= 1879 in China =

- Decades: 1850s; 1860s; 1870s; 1880s; 1890s
- See also: Other events of 1879; History of China • Timeline • Years

Events from the year 1879 in China.

== Incumbents ==
- Guangxu Emperor (5th year)
  - Regent: Empress Dowager Cixi

=== Viceroys ===
- Viceroy of Zhili — Li Hongzhang
- Viceroy of Min-Zhe — He Jing
- Viceroy of Huguang — Li Hanzhang
- Viceroy of Shaan-Gan — Zuo Zongtang
- Viceroy of Liangguang — Liu Kunyi then Zhang Shusheng then Yukuan
- Viceroy of Yun-Gui — Liu Changyou
- Viceroy of Sichuan — Ding Baozhen
- Viceroy of Liangjiang — Shen Baozhen then Liu Kunyi

== Events ==
- Northern Chinese Famine of 1876–79
- St. John's College (Shanghai) founded
