= 1872 in China =

- Decades: 1850s; 1860s; 1870s; 1880s; 1890s
- See also: Other events of 1872; History of China • Timeline • Years

Events from the year 1872 in China.

== Incumbents ==
- Tongzhi Emperor (12th year)
  - Regent: Empress Dowager Cixi

=== Viceroys ===
- Viceroy of Zhili — Li Hongzhang
- Viceroy of Min-Zhe — Li Henian
- Viceroy of Huguang — Li Hanzhang
- Viceroy of Shaan-Gan — Zuo Zongtang
- Viceroy of Liangguang — Ruilin
- Viceroy of Yun-Gui — Liu Yuezhao
- Viceroy of Sichuan — Wu Tang
- Viceroy of Liangjiang — Zeng Guofan then He Jing then Zhang Shusheng

== Events ==
- Miao Rebellion (1854–73)
- Dungan Revolt (1862–77)
- Panthay Rebellion
- Tongzhi Restoration

== Establishments ==
- Yusan Hall
- Dongquan Lighthouse
- Shen Bao

== Births ==
- Fok Hing-tong, businesswoman
- Li Shouxin (possibly)

== Deaths ==
- Du Wenxiu
- Zeng Guofan, (1811 – 1872) mysteriously dies in Hong Xiuquan's former mansion
