= 1871 in China =

- Decades: 1850s; 1860s; 1870s; 1880s; 1890s
- See also: Other events of 1871; History of China • Timeline • Years

Events from the year 1871 in China.

== Incumbents ==
- Tongzhi Emperor (11th year)
  - Regent: Empress Dowager Cixi

== Events ==
- Miao Rebellion (1854–73)
- Dungan Revolt (1862–77)
- Panthay Rebellion ends
  - May 1873 — Momien besieged and stormed by imperial troops in, their resistance broke completely. Gov. Ta-sa-kon was captured and executed by order of the Imperial government.
- Beiyang Fleet created
- Mudan incident in Taiwan
- Tongzhi Restoration

== Births ==
- August 14 – Guangxu Emperor, emperor of China (d. 1908)
- Qiu Yufang, revolutionary, writer and feminist (d. 1904)
