= 1867 in China =

- Decades: 1840s; 1850s; 1860s; 1870s; 1880s
- See also: Other events of 1867; History of China • Timeline • Years

Events from the year 1867 in China.

== Incumbents ==
- Tongzhi Emperor (6th year)
  - Regent: Empress Dowager Cixi

== Events ==
- Nian Rebellion
  - Battle of Inlon River, Nian forces lose entire Hubei region
- Miao Rebellion (1854–73)
- Dungan Revolt (1862–77)
- Panthay Rebellion
- Rover incident in Taiwan
  - Formosa Expedition
- Tongzhi Restoration
- Hakka-Punti Clan Wars end, Hakka were allocated their own independent sub-prefecture, Chixi (赤溪镇), which was carved out of south-eastern Taishan, while others were relocated to Guangxi Province, mass emigration

== Births ==
- Jiang Shufang, Chinese school pioneer

== Deaths ==
- Zhang Shusheng killed in battle against Taiping Rebellion loyalists
- Ren Zhu, Nian general killed in battle again Qing forces
