= Wu Jianping =

Chinese computer scientist

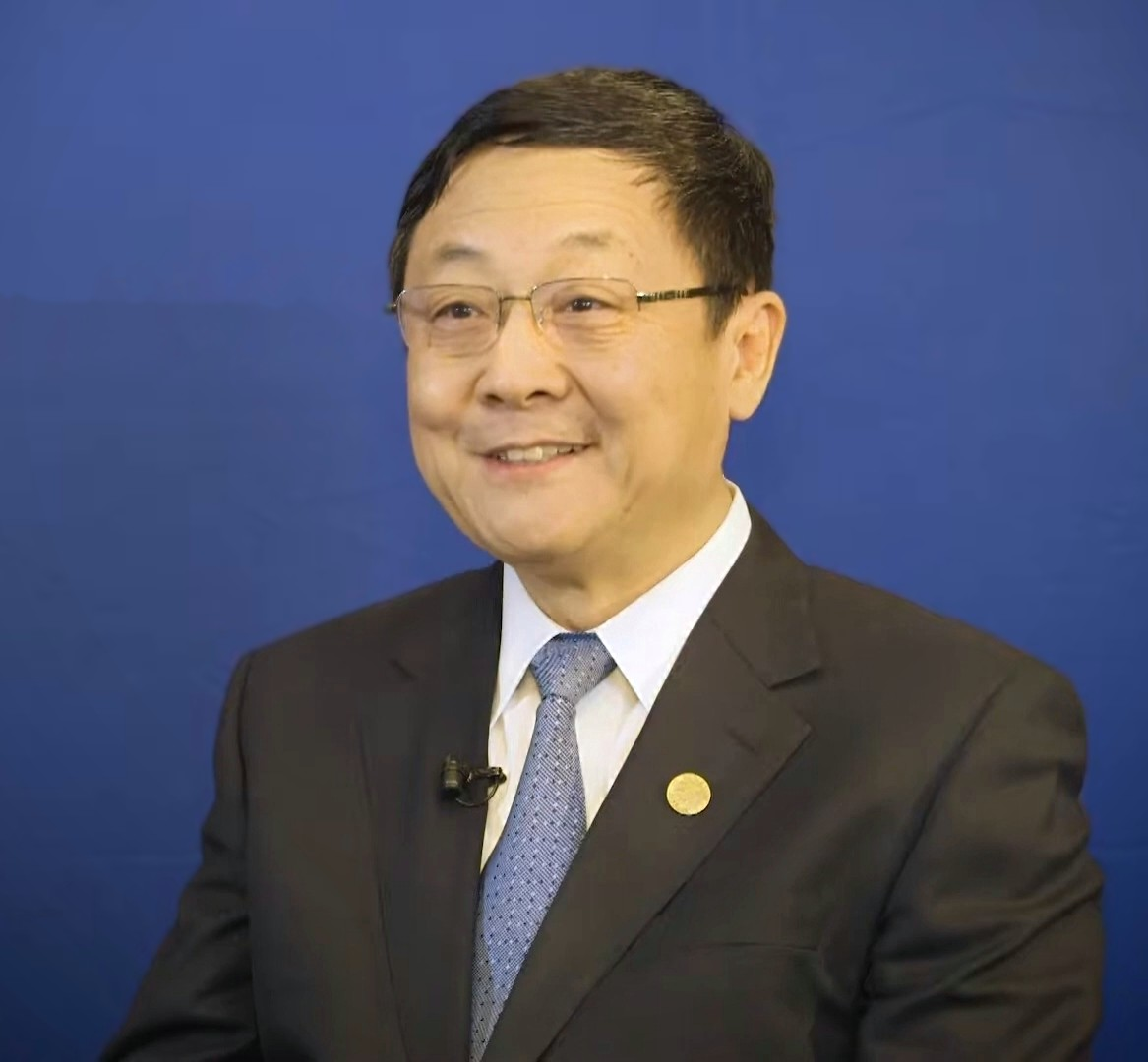
- Born: October 4, 1953 (age 72); Taiyuan, Shanxi, China
- Other name: Jian-Ping Wu
- Education: Tsinghua University
- Scientific career
- Fields: Computer Network Science
- Workplaces: Tsinghua University

Chinese name
- Traditional Chinese: 吳建平
- Simplified Chinese: 吴建平
Transcriptions
Standard Mandarin
- Hanyu Pinyin: Wú Jiànpíng

Wu Jianping (Chinese: 吴建平; born 4 October 1953), also known as Jian-Ping Wu, is a Chinese computer scientist. He is Professor and Chair of Computer Science and Technology at Tsinghua University. He is also Chairman of the China Education and Research Network (CERNET) Technical Board and director of the CERNET center, and vice president of the China Internet Association.

== Background and education ==
Wu was born on 4 October 1953 in Taiyuan, Shanxi, China, with his ancestral home in Juye County, Shandong.

Wu graduated from the Department of Electrical Engineering of Tsinghua University in 1977, and earned his master's degree (1982) and Ph.D. (1997) in computer science and technology, also from Tsinghua. He was a visiting scholar at the University of British Columbia in Canada from 1987 to 1989.

== Career ==
His research interests include computer architectures, routing and protocols. As one of main initiators and promoters of Next-Generation Internet (NGI) in China, he is in charge of the CERNET2 backbone, which deployed the world's largest IPv6 Internet backbone.

== Awards ==
He was awarded the 2010 Jonathan B. Postel Service Award. for his services to Internet developments in China.

Wu was elected an academician of the Chinese Academy of Engineering in 2015. In 2018, he became a laureate of the Asian Scientist 100 by the Asian Scientist. In September 2019, he was elected an International Fellow of the Royal Academy of Engineering.
