= Xia Feiyun =

Chinese conductor

Xia Feiyun (夏飞云 Tongxiang, Zhejiang, 1936) is a Chinese conductor. Xia studied violin, western conducting and Chinese conducting at the Shanghai Conservatory 1953–1961, then joined the teaching staff, later conducting the Shanghai Conservatory Chinese Orchestra. Xia has an extensive discography on Chinese classical labels, as well as Marco Polo and Yellow River.

== Selected discography ==
- Wild Geese on the Sandbank Shanghai Conservatory Chinese Orchestra, Fei-yun Xia Yellow River Records
