= Fu Jiamo =

Fu Jiamo (傅家谟, July 1935 – June 11, 2015) was an academician of the Chinese Academy of Sciences (CAS) and professor of environmental and architectural engineering in Shanghai University. He wrote about recycling electronic waste.
