= Wu Hanming =

- Born: June 1952 (age 74); China
- Education: University of Science and Technology of China
- Scientific career
- Fields: Microelectronic technology
- Workplaces: Semiconductor Manufacturing International Corporation

Chinese name
- Traditional Chinese: 吳漢明
- Simplified Chinese: 吴汉明
Transcriptions
Standard Mandarin
- Hanyu Pinyin: Wú Hànmíng

Wu Hanming (Chinese: 吴汉明; born June 1952) is a Chinese microelectronics engineer and the current vice-president of the Technology R & D department of Semiconductor Manufacturing International Corporation.

== Biography ==
Wu was born in June 1952. During the Down to the Countryside Movement, he became a sent-down youth in his hometown and forced to work in the fields instead of going to middle school. After the resumption of National College Entrance Examination, he obtained a doctor's degree from the University of Science and Technology of China. After graduation, he was a postdoctoral fellow at the University of Texas at Austin and University of California, Berkeley. He was a senior R & D engineer at Novellus Systems and Intel before returning to China. In 1993 he was offered a position at the Institute of Mechanics, Chinese Academy of Sciences. He joined a company in Alabama in 1995. In 1995 he was hired as a chief engineer at Intel. He returned to China in 2001 and became chief technology officer of Semiconductor Manufacturing International Corporation.

== Honours and awards ==
- 2008 State Science and Technology Progress Award (Second Class)
- 2013 State Science and Technology Progress Award (Second Class)
- November 22, 2019 Member of the Chinese Academy of Engineering (CAE)
