= Shen Shou =

Chinese embroiderer

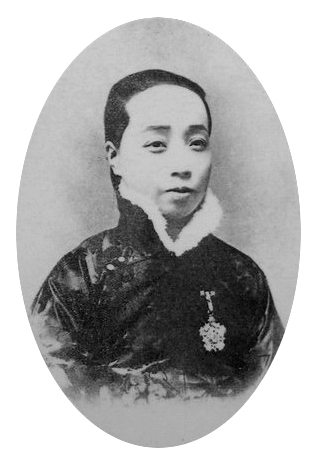
Shen Shou

Shen Shou (Chinese: 沈壽; 1874–1921) was a Chinese embroiderer during the late Qing and early Republican period. She was pivotal in transforming embroidery from a feminine pastime into a craft that provided for women workers and their families. She created a signature style that combined traditional techniques with international taste and subjects and brought Chinese embroidery into modernity. Later in life, she established herself as a master in arts and crafts education and practices.

== Early life ==
Shen was born Shen Yunzhi in 1874 in Jiangsu Province, in eastern China. Shen and her sisters were taught the craft of embroidery as children. She learned quickly and became proficient enough to sell her needle work to help support her family. Shen married Yu Jue, a well-connected and highly cultured official, when she was 20. Her marriage to Yu gave her the connections and monetary stability to continue to improve her technique and create embroidery art.

== Career ==
Yu Jue became essential to Shou's development as an artist. His background in literati painting and calligraphy allowed him to help his wife design her work as well as sell her work to patrons of status and wealth. Shen Shou was first recognized for her talent in 1904 when she created eight pieces of needlework depicting each of the Eight Chinese Immortals to be presented to Empress Dowager Cixi as a birthday gift.

Cixi was so impressed by Shen's talent that she placed her in multiple capacities within the Qing government. Shen was appointed the Chief Instructor of the Section of Embroidery Workers in the Ministry of Agriculture, Crafts, and Commerce. The Ministry of Commerce also put Shen Shou in charge of assessing the authenticity of embroidered works. In addition, she became an embroidery teacher to women of the court.

During this period, Shen gained notoriety in China and was given opportunities to visit Japan and Europe to learn more about local embroidery practices. She modernized Chinese embroidery by bringing into her work “artistic” styles and techniques that she had learned abroad. Her rise in international popularity helped to bring Chinese art onto the world stage and affect the global perception of China. While she was quickly becoming a prominent artist in China, she caught the attention of politician Zhang Jian, and he became her main benefactor and patron.

In 1911, Shen Shou and her husband moved to Tianjin, where they started a school for women's crafts. Zhang Jian helped Shen establish the institute to ensure that her skill would be continued on through generations. Shen created a curriculum that involved studying many forms of art, including painting and literature, instead of solely focusing on embroidery. Her teaching methods encouraged her students to gain inspiration from life and create natural and realistic embroidery. These methods were then recreated at all schools throughout the country.

Shen Shou's unique style is known as Xuehuan. Her pieces have been referred to as “lifelike embroidery” because they were known to resemble paintings. This effect was achieved through varied stitches that created natural and realistic color gradation. Shen's rise as an artist came at a time of modernization when China experienced many political, social, and economical changes. Embroidery at this time transformed from a woman's trade to an elevated art form with economic value.

== Notable works ==
Shen Shou's best-known piece is a Portrait of Christ. It is based on the Renaissance painter Guido Reni's oil painting of Christ wearing thorns. Like many of her works, this artwork is an example of “lifelike embroidery.’’ She used more than 100 different shades throughout the piece, creating shading and lighting effects. This piece was first exhibited at the Panama-Pacific International Exposition in 1915 and won a gold medal.

Shou exhibited her portrait of the Italian empress The Italian Queen in 1909 at the Nanjing South Seas Exhibition, the first world fair in China. The portrait was a gift to the emperor of Italy and won first place at the exhibition. Similar to the later Portrait of Christ, the embroidery was also praised for its natural coloring and lifelike representation.

== See also ==
- Zhang Jian (politician)
- Suzhou embroidery
