= Mai Cheng =

Chinese-Norwegian painter

Mai Cheng (born in Beijing, China 1955) is a Norwegian painter. She was educated both in China and in Norway. Belonging to the first students who were admitted to the China Central Academy of Fine Arts when this institution was reopened after the Cultural Revolution in 1977. She continued her education at the State Academy of Arts in Oslo, Norway, where she became a Norwegian citizen. In April 1992 Mai Cheng had one of the first exhibitions of abstract art in the National Art Museum of China (NAMOC) in Beijing.

She works in a style she calls Feng-shui Art , combining calligraphy and elements from Chinese history with signs and symbols from Greek, Egyptian and Norse mythology. Apart from Norway, where most of her work is displayed and sold, she has exhibited in France (Paris, Lyon, and Cannes), Germany (Hamburg), Belgium (Brussels), United States (New York and Palm Beach), as well as Iceland (Reykjavík). Her calligraphy has been used in decorating the outside walls of Bibliotheca Alexandrina. Since 2001 Mai Cheng has had her studio in Menton in France.
