= Yu Baoxuan =

Chinese politician

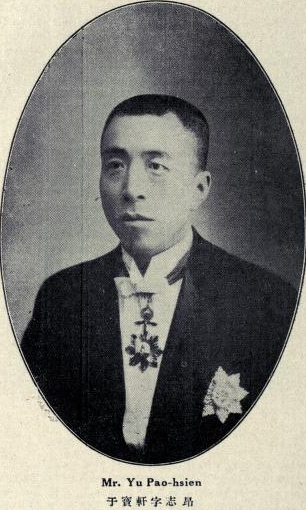
Yu Baoxuan

Yu Baoxuan (simplified Chinese: 于宝轩; traditional Chinese: 于寶軒; pinyin: Yú Bǎoxuān; Wade–Giles: Yü Pao-hsüan; born 1875) was a politician in the Republic of China. He was a member of the Anhui clique. Later he became an important politician during the Reformed Government of the Republic of China and the Wang Jingwei regime (Republic of China-Nanjing). His courtesy name was Zi'ang (子昂) or Zhi'ang (志昂). He was born in Jiangdu, Jiangsu.

== Biography ==
Yu Baoxuan spent early years in Sichuan, where his father was a prefect. First he became a Jiansheng (監生; student of Guozijian), then he went to Japan for his higher education. After the Boxer Rebellion in 1900, he returned to China and first joined the Department of Police in Peking under the Qing dynasty. Subsequently, he was transferred to the Ministry for Interior in recognition of his useful services. He was appointed Senior Clerk and acted concurrently as a member of the Bureau of Constitutional Reform.

On the establishment of the Republic of China in 1912, Yu Baoxuan was appointed Chief of the Statistical Bureau and division Chief of the Police Department, Ministry for Interior. In the same year he was also elected an expectant member of the Senate. In 1914 he was appointed Director of the Civil Affairs Bureau, Ministry for Interior. In 1916 he became Senator upon the restoration of Parliament.

Upon the second dissolution of the Parliament in 1917, Yu Baoxuan was appointed Secretary to the Ministry for Communications. In same December he was promoted to be Vice-Minister for Interior, and supported Minister Qian Nengxun (錢能訓). He became concurrently in February 1918, Chief of the Parliamental Election Bureau under the Parliament Anfu Club controlled. On June 13, 1919, he was appointed acting Minister for Interior. Three days later, however, he was relieved of the Vice-Ministership and also of the post of Chief of the Election Bureau. In August 1920 he was appointed Associate Director General of the Government Economic Investigation Bureau. In September 1923 he was appointed Special Member of the Financial Reorganization Commission.

Upon Liang Hongzhi established Reformed Government of the Republic of China in April 1938, Yu Baoxuan was appointed Vice-Minister for Communications. The Wang Jingwei regime was established in March 1940, he also became a member of it. In May 1941 he was appointed Observer to the Commission for High Ranking Officer's Examination (高等考試典試委員會監試委員).

After 1942, the whereabouts of Yu Baoxuan were unknown.

== Awards and decorations ==
Order of the Precious Brilliant Golden Grain
Order of Wen-Hu
