= Jeffrey Tao =

Jeffrey Kin-Cheung Tao
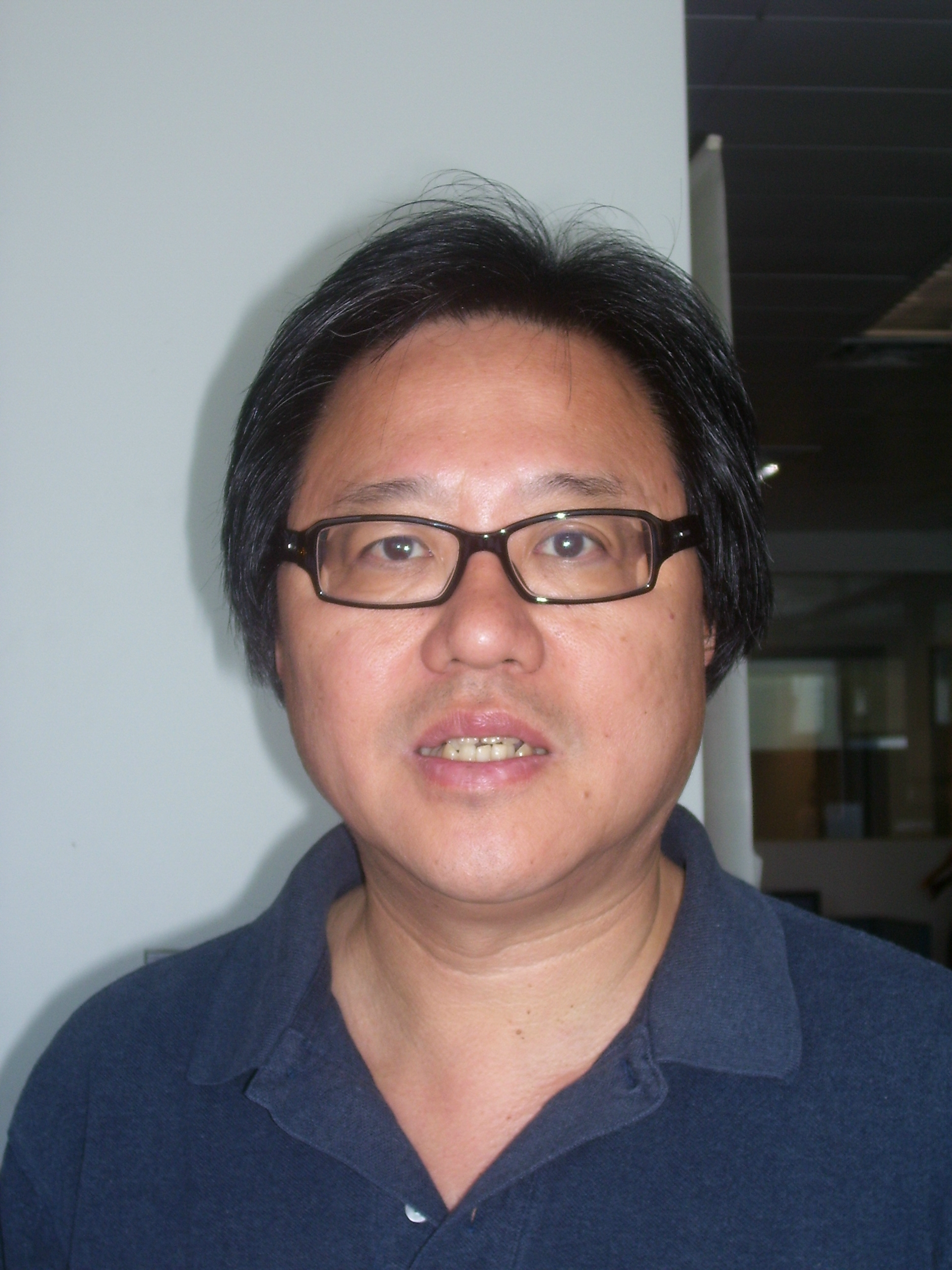
- Born: May 8, 1948 (age 78); Shanghai
- Occupation: Interpreter

Jeffrey Kin-Cheung Tao (born 8 May 1948) is a senior interpreter of the Chinese Interpretation Section at the United Nations headquarters in New York City.

== Biography ==
=== Personal ===
Jeffrey Tao was born in Shanghai on May 8, 1948, but grew up in Hong Kong.

=== Education ===
Tao attended the University of Sussex in England, graduating in 1971 with a B.A. Degree. He received his master's degree in Business Administration from New York University in 1987. Because of his competencies in English, Mandarin, Cantonese, Shanghainese, French and Russian, Tao once aspired of broadcasting for the British Broadcasting Corporation (BBC) office in Hong Kong.

=== Career ===
Tao began his career as a conference interpreter when he joined the Chinese Section of the United Nations Interpretation Service in New York in 1972. He attained the position of senior interpreter in 1983. As a simultaneous interpreter, Mr. Tao's real-time work runs a whole range of [UN] topics, from highly political and sensitive meetings of the Security Council such as from issues about Iraq and the Middle East; to many sessions of the Law of the Sea Conferences culminating in the signing of the Treaty; to specialized technical meetings on budgetary questions, weapons systems, the environment, trade law, statistics and international accounting. He has traveled extensively on UN assignment, that is: to Rio de Janeiro for the UN Conference on the Environment and Development in 1992, and to the International Meeting on Small Island Developing States held in Mauritius in January 2005. He also worked at meetings at the level of Heads of States or Governments during the 50th Anniversary of the United Nations in 1995 and the Millennium Summit in 2000.

"Interpretation is not just language in the technical sense. It allows you to use the power of speech as a form of oratory."- Jeffrey Tao, UN Interpreter, Speaking at Babel, NYC24.com, 2001.

Tao has given lectures at the China Institute in America and at the Asian-American/Asian Research Institute. His lectures are about "the history of simultaneous interpretation at the United Nations" and "the impact of the changes in the international situation and China's opening-up and reforms" on simultaneous interpretation work.

=== Interpreting credits ===
Jeffrey Tao provided simultaneous interpretation for former Chinese president Jiang Ze Min's speech at the historic ceremony marking Hong Kong's return to China, which was broadcast live on ABC News in July 1997.

== See also ==
- List of UN Interpreters
- United Nations Interpretation Service Website, date retrieved: 28 May 2007
- Endrst, Elsa B. (1991). "Inside the glass booth". UN Chronicle. 28 (3). Archived from the original on March 10, 2007 – via FindArticles.
