= Chongqing No.1 Middle School =

Secondary school in China

Chongqing No.1 Middle School (simplified Chinese: 重庆一中; traditional Chinese: 重慶一中; pinyin: Chóng-qìng Yī-zhōng) is a secondary school in Chongqing, People's Republic of China.

The main campus is located in the center of the Shapingba district while two other campuses are located in Chenjiawan and in the College Town (大学城). It was founded in 1955.
