= Liu Xingtu =

Chinese agronomist (1936–2021)

Liu Xingtu (Chinese: 刘兴土; 10 September 1936 – 6 May 2021) was a Chinese agronomist born in Malacca, Malaya. He specialized in wetland research and regional agriculture of Northeast China.

Liu was elected an academician of the Chinese Academy of Engineering in 2007. He was vice director of the Wetland Research Centre of China, an arm of the Chinese Academy of Sciences, and contract professor of the Regional Farming System Research Center of China Agriculture University.

== Wetland Specialist ==
As the leader of the National Key Technology R&D Program of China in the region of the Songnen and Sanjiang Plains, Liu has presided over many major programs and projects, such as the survey of agricultural resources, the ecological engineering of wetlands, the soil and water control of low-lying farmland, the sustainable development of regional agriculture, and so on. Also, as the director of the experts committee of wetland survey in China, he took charge of the project "Survey and Classification of Lakes and Marshes in China".

Liu initiated the model of Complex Ecological Agriculture Project of Paddy-Reed-Fish, blazed a way in the located ecological research on marsh, and accomplished a great deal in the harness of low lying farmland, regional ecological conservation and agricultural sustainable development.

== Works and awards ==
Liu wrote 13 monographs including "Mire Science Conspectus", "Wetlands in Northeastern China", "Research on Comprehensive Development of Regional Agriculture in Northeast China", "Natural Environmental Changes and Ecological Protection in the Sanjiang Plain", and "Management on Degraded Land and Agricultural Development in the Songnen Plain", and more than 100 articles.

He has won three national second or third place awards for progress in science and technology and five provincial or ministerial first or second place prizes for progress in science and technology. Furthermore, he was granted the honors of National Young Experts with Outstanding Contributions, National Excellent Returned Overseas Chinese Intellectual, Advanced Individual of National Key Technology R&D Program in the Eighth Five-Year Plan and Ninth Five-Year Plan of the People's Republic of China, Distinguished Expert of Jilin Province. In 1991, he enjoyed a Special Subsidy from State Council of China.
