= Kizil massacre =

Massacre during the Kumul Rebellion

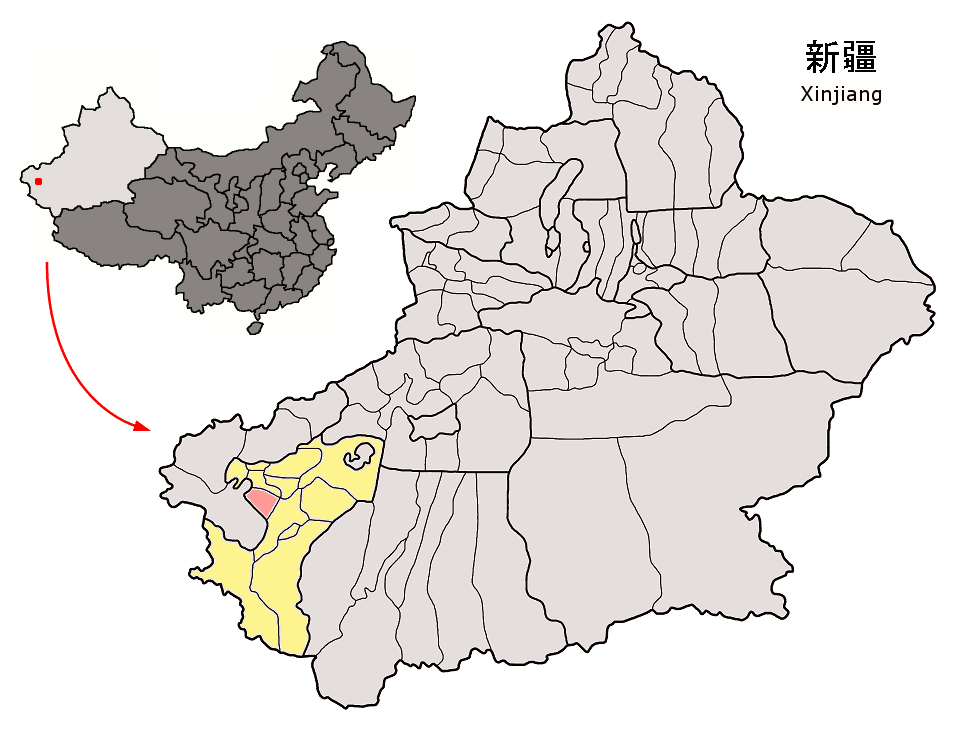
- Kizil is a village in Yengisar.
- Location: Near Kashgar, Xinjiang
- Date: June 1933
- Target: Chinese soldiers and Chinese civilians
- Deaths: 800
- Perpetrators: Uighur and Kirghiz fighters under the command of Osman Ali and Nur Ahmad Jan Bughra

The Kizil massacre (Chinese: 克孜爾大屠殺) occurred in June 1933, when Uighur and Kyrgyz Turkic fighters broke their agreement not to attack a column of retreating Hui Chinese soldiers and civilians from Yarkand New City on their way to Kashgar. An estimated 800 Chinese Muslim and Chinese civilians were killed by Turkic Muslim fighters.

When the Hotan rebels reached the Shache area, they defeated the local garrison and concluded an agreement with Hui soldiers (Chinese Muslims) and Han soldiers who had converted to Islam, guaranteeing them safe withdrawal. However, after retreating, the Hui forces collected weapons from the city with the intention of joining the Chinese garrison in Kashgar. Upon learning of this, the Hotan rebels informed the Kashgar rebels led by Timur Ali, who attacked and defeated these troops at Kizil. Some Hui soldiers escaped and later joined the Hui army in Kashgar.

== See also ==
- List of massacres in China
