= Wang Weike =

Chinese translator

Wang Weike (Chinese: 王維克; 1900–1952) was a Chinese translator, the first to produce a complete Chinese translation of Dante's Divina Commedia (rendered indirectly from French).

He was a native of Jintan, Jiangsu Province. In 1917, he attended the Nanjing Hohai Engineering School (now Hohai University). He was forced to leave the school, being an active participant of student activities. He then left for Shanghai to study natural sciences at Utopia University. After graduation, he went to Aurora University to study French. Back to his hometown, he taught in Jintan County Elementary Secondary School (金壇縣立初級中學) for one year. During this period of time, he became the patron of the future mathematician Hua Luogeng, who was to bear a lifelong gratitude towards him. In 1925, he went to Paris, and became one of the students of Marie Curie.

He returned to China in 1928, and taught at China Public School (中國公學) in Shanghai. One year later, he was back in Jintan, and got married. He served as the schoolmaster of Jintan County Elementary Secondary School, and employed Hua Luogeng, who was then poor and sick.

Beside Dante's epic, Wang also translated Kalidasa's play Sakuntala into Chinese (again indirectly from French, but it is said that he spent some time to learn Sanskrit from a Buddhist monk in order to produce a better translation).
