= Sun Liqun (historian) =

Chinese historian (1950–2020)

- 孙立群
- Born: April 15, 1950; Tianjin, China
- Died: February 10, 2020 (aged 69); Tianjin, China
- Occupation: Historian

Academic background
- Education: Nankai University

Academic work
- Discipline: History
- Sub-discipline: Qin, Han, Wei, Jin, and the Southern and Northern dynasties
- Institutions: Nankai University

Chinese name
- Traditional Chinese: 孫立群
- Simplified Chinese: 孙立群
Transcriptions
Standard Mandarin
- Hanyu Pinyin: Sūn Lìqún

Sun Liqun (Chinese: 孙立群; pinyin: Sūn Lìqún; 15 April 1950 – 10 February 2020) was a Chinese historian who was a professor at Nankai University.

== Biography ==
Sun was born in Tianjin, on April 15, 1950. In 1975, he graduated from Nankai University, where he majored in history. After graduation, he taught at the university. Since 2006, he regularly gave lectures on Chinese historical figures on the television programme Lecture Room shown on CCTV-10. He retired on September 1, 2015. He died of illness on February 10, 2020.

== Works ==
- 中国古代的士人生活 (in Chinese). Beijing: Commercial Press. 2014. ISBN 9787100095204.
- 从司马到司马：西晋的历程 (in Chinese). Beijing: Zhong Hua Book Company. 2011. ISBN 9787101081701.
- 解读大秦政坛双星：吕不韦与李斯 (in Chinese). Beijing: Zhong Hua Book Company. 2007. ISBN 9787101056228.
- Li Zhi'an; Sun Liqun (1998). 中华文化通志·社会阶层制度志 (in Chinese). Shanghai: Shanghai People's Publishing House. ISBN 9787208022775.
