= An Disheng =

Chinese artist and activist

An Disheng (An Houzhai)
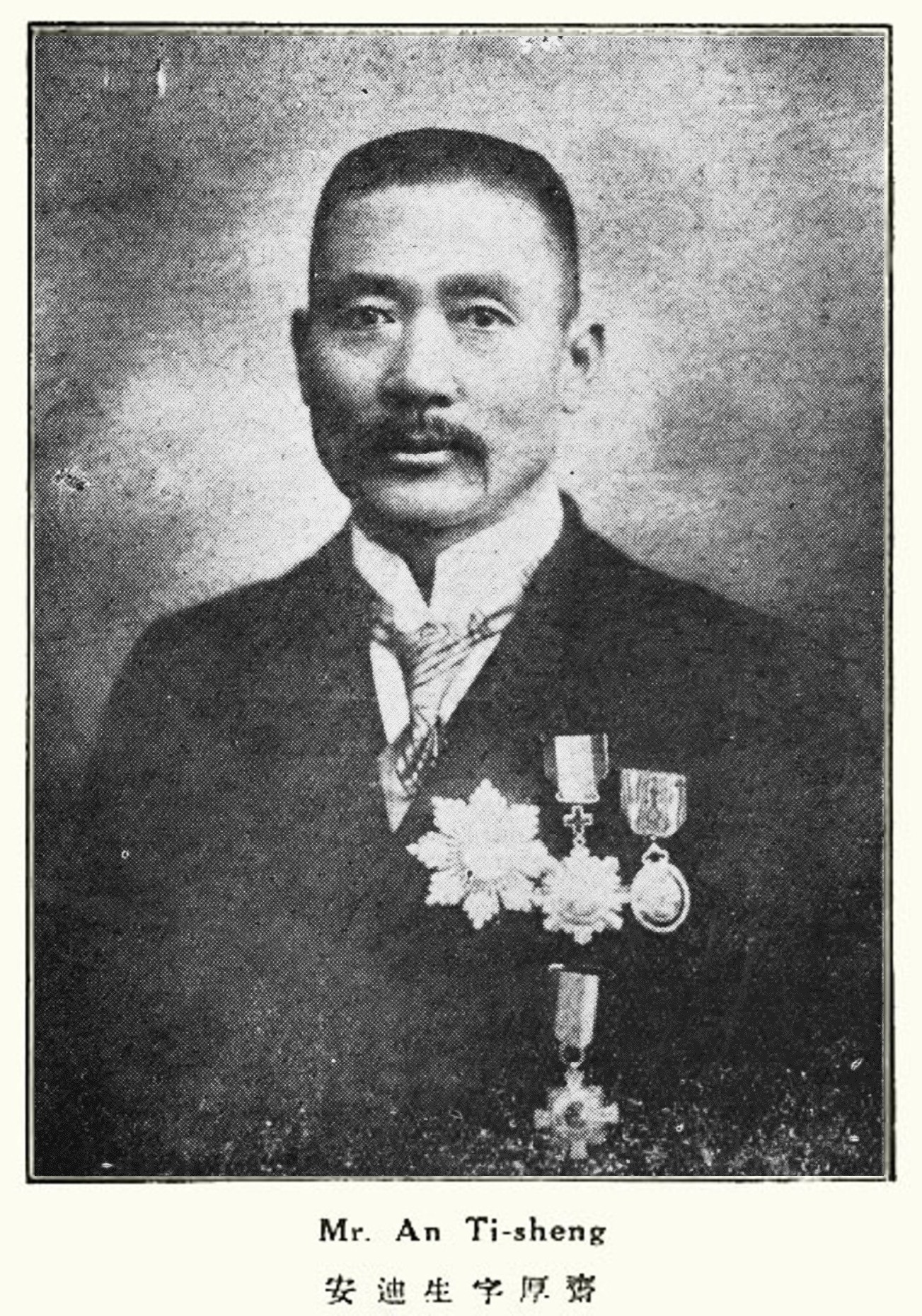
- Born: 1868; Xianghe County, Metropolitan District, China
- Other names: An Houzhai
- Occupations: Artist, Activist
- Known for: Inventing Pao Hua silver enamel ware, serving as president of the Metropolitan General Chamber of Commerce, and participating in the National Association of the Chambers of Commerce.
- Awards: Fifth Order of Chiaho, Fourth Order of Chiaho, Third Order of Chiaho, Second Order of Chiaho, Second Class Medal of the Ministry of Finance, Second Class Medal of the Ministry of Agriculture and Commerce, Second Class Medal of the Ministry of Justice

An Disheng (Chinese: 安迪生, 1868 – ?), later changed into An Houzhai (Chinese: 安厚斋), was a Chinese artist and activist.

== Biography ==
An Difsheng was born at Xianghe County, Metropolitan District, in 1868. He received his Chinese education in the old Confucian school. As a young boy, he showed artistic ability.

In 1902, An was made the clerk of the Hanlin Academy and in 1904, he became an expectant magistrate in the Metropolitan District. He constantly devoted his time and energy to the study of the fine arts and among his accomplishments was the invention of Pao Hua silver enamel ware which is well-known today.

In 1905, An became the director of the Commercial Exhibit Hall established by the Board of Commerce and was made a member of the Beijing Chamber of Commerce.

In the summer of 1910, a National Exhibition was held in Nanjing, and An was a member of the executive committee.

In October 1911, he was a member of the Chinese Industrial Party which toured Japan.

In 1912, the year of the Republic, the Beijing government called a national conference to discuss industrial and commercial affairs of the country. An, as representative of the Metropolitan General Chamber of Commerce, attended the Conference which resulted in the founding of the National Association of the Chambers of Commerce which held its first conference in Beijing in 1914. An represented the Metropolitan General Chamber of Commerce and was subsequently elected general secretary of the Association's Beijing office. Since the establishment of the Directorate General of the Metropolitan Municipal Affairs, after the establishment of the Republic, An served as a member of the committee on Municipal Affairs.

In 1914, he held the position of vice-president of the Panama Exhibition Commission in Beijing.

In February 1918, An was elected president of the Metropolitan General Chamber of Commerce and in August 1918, he was elected a member of the Shunzhi (Metropolitan and Zhili) Provincial Assembly.

In December 1918, he played an important part in the association for the Promotion of Internal Peace, being Chief-in-Charge of the General Affairs Department.

In May 1919, when public sentiment against the pro-Japanese Anfu party developed into a nationwide boycott of Japanese goods, An acted as leader of the industrial and commercial interests participating.

In 1922, he represented the Metropolitan District at the Customs Tariff Revision Conference in Shanghai. The Pao Hua silver enamel ware invented by An had largely supplanted Japanese cloisonne in Beijing. At present, Japanese cloisonne had practically disappeared from the Beijing market. There were now in Beijing a large number of Poa Hua Silver Enamel Ware factories, most of which were founded by the inventor himself.

In October 1935, he plotted and anticipated the Xianghe Incident to gain the independence of Xianghe, which was considered to be part of the hyperaggressive Japanese's plan. He became the head of Xiangge Country, but stepped down 7 days later.

An lived for 80 years but died before the People's Republic of China was founded.

== Awards ==
President Feng Guozhang conferred upon An the Fifth Order of Chiaho (Jiahe) in May 1919; President Xu Shichang awarded him the Fourth Order of Chiaho in January 1920, and the Third Order of Chiaho in February 1922; and President Li Yuanhong, the Second Order of Chiaho in March 1923.

Besides, An had received the Second Class Medal of the Ministry of Finance which he had helped to tide over many financial crises in Beijing. He also had received the Second Class Medal of the Ministry of Agriculture and Commerce to which department he had been an Advisor for several years; and that of the Second Class Medal of the Ministry of Justice to which he had rendered assistance in the improvement of industrial establishments in connection with the Beijing penitentiaries. An held the presidency of the Metropolitan General Chamber of Commerce for a time, being relieved in 1924.
