= Guangdong Institute of Education =

Higher education institution in Guangzhou, China

Coordinates: 23.09785°N 113.31643°E

Guangdong Institute of Education (simplified Chinese: 广东教育学院; traditional Chinese: 廣東教育學院; pinyin: Guǎngdōng jiàoyù xuéyuàn) is a provincial higher education institution based in Guangzhou, Guangdong province, China.

== History ==
The university was established in 1955.
