= Li Qiang (Lianyungang) =

Chinese politician

- 李强

Communist Party Secretary of Lianyungang
- In office September 2011 – September 2014
- Preceded by: Wang Jianhua (politician, born 1952)
- Succeeded by: Yang Xingshi

Mayor of Yancheng
- In office January 2007 – September 2011
- Preceded by: Zhao Peng
- Succeeded by: Wei Guoqiang

Personal details
- Born: November 1955 (age 70) Shuyang County, Jiangsu, China
- Party: Chinese Communist Party
- Education: Southeast University

Li Qiang (simplified Chinese: 李强; traditional Chinese: 李強; pinyin: Lǐ Qiáng; born November 1955) is a Chinese former politician from Jiangsu province. He was mayor of Yancheng and the Chinese Communist Party Committee Secretary of the coastal city of Lianyungang, both located in Jiangsu province, before being investigated for suspected corruption in September 2014. He was a delegate to the 11th National People's Congress.

== Biography ==
Li was born and raised in Shuyang County, Suqian, Jiangsu. Li graduated from Southeast University in 1997, majoring in business administration.

He became involved in politics in December 1970 and joined the Chinese Communist Party (CCP) in August 1975.

Beginning in 1970, he shad several posts in Jiangsu Military District, including soldier, platoon leader, and staff. In March 1981 he was transferred to Nanjing Military Region, he worked there until September 1988.

From December 1996 to December 2000, he was Chief Executive and CCP Deputy Committee Secretary of Baixia District. He became the Chief Executive of Jianye District in December 2000, he was re-elected in July 2003.

He became Vice-Mayor of Yancheng in December 2005, and was promoted to Mayor and Deputy Party Secretary in January 2007. In September 2011, he was appointed CCP Committee Secretary of Lianyungang City.

On September 17, 2014, he was taken away and detained by officers from the Central Commission for Discipline Inspection for investigation immediately following a meeting that he chaired. He was the first prefectural-level party secretary from Jiangsu to be detained following the 18th National Congress of the Chinese Communist Party in 2012.

Government offices
Preceded by Zhao Peng	Mayor of Yancheng; 2007–2011	Succeeded by Wei Guoqiang
Party political offices
Preceded by Wang Jianhua	Communist Party Secretary of Lianyungang; 2011–2014	Succeeded by Yang Shengshi
