= Gao Enhong =

Chinese politician

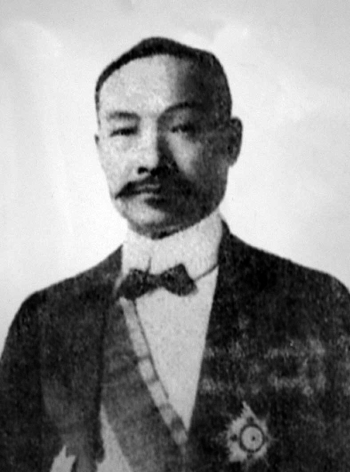
Gao Enhong

Gao Enhong (Chinese: 高恩洪; pinyin: Gāo Ēnhóng, born 1875 - died 1943 in Beijing) was a Chinese politician in Republic of China in the early 20th century.

As governor of the Jiaozhou territory, Gao Enhong advocated the establishment of Qingdao University, a private academic institution, in 1924. He also served as first president of the university.

After losing his office as a consequence of the Second Zhili–Fengtian War, Gao Enhong left politics and went into business.
