= 1883 in China =

- Decades: 1860s; 1870s; 1880s; 1890s; 1900s
- See also: Other events of 1883; History of China • Timeline • Years

Events from the year 1883 in China.

== Incumbents ==
- Guangxu Emperor (9th year)
  - Regent: Empress Dowager Cixi

=== Viceroys ===
- Viceroy of Zhili — Zhang Shusheng then Li Hongzhang
- Viceroy of Min-Zhe — He Jing
- Viceroy of Huguang — Tu Zongying then Bian Baodi
- Viceroy of Shaan-Gan — Tan Zhonglin
- Viceroy of Liangguang — Zhang Shusheng
- Viceroy of Yun-Gui — Cen Yuying
- Viceroy of Sichuan — Ding Baozhen
- Viceroy of Liangjiang — Zuo Zongtang

== Events ==
- Tonkin Campaign
  - May 19 - Battle of Cầu Giấy (Paper Bridge)
  - December 11–17 - Sơn Tây Campaign

== Births ==
- March 8 - Huang Fu
- October 8 - Yan Xishan
- Chen Xiefen (1883–1923), was a Chinese feminist and journalist, regarded as one of the first feminists and female journalists in China

== Deaths ==
- September 23: Seah Eu Chin, Singapore
