= 1865 in China =

- Decades: 1840s; 1850s; 1860s; 1870s; 1880s
- See also: Other events of 1865; History of China • Timeline • Years

Events from the year 1865 in China.

== Incumbents ==
- Tongzhi Emperor (5th year)
  - Regent: Empress Dowager Cixi
  - Regent: Prince Gong

== Events ==
- Taiping Rebellion
  - Battle of Fujian, Qing forces clear remnants of Taiping loyalists
- Nian Rebellion
  - Siege of Beijing (1865)
- Miao Rebellion (1854–73)
- Dungan Revolt (1862–77)
- Panthay Rebellion
- Prince Gong steps down from regency but continues being head of the Grand Council
- Tongzhi Restoration

== Births ==
- Hü King Eng, second ethnic Chinese woman to attend university in the United States, became a famous physician

== Deaths ==
- Sengge Rinchen Qing commander killed by the forces of a minor rebel leader of the Nian Rebellion
- Li Shixian, Taiping commander, killed by his own troops after they surrender to the Qing
