= Zheng Shuang (artist) =

Zheng Shuang (Chinese: 郑爽; born in 1936 in Changchun, Jilin) is a Chinese woodcut artist based in Guangzhou, Guangdong. Zheng Shuang graduated from the Central Academy of Fine Arts in Beijing in 1962, and in 1963 was later appointed to teach at the Guangzhou College of Art. Zheng Shuang's Hydrangea won a gold medal at the 1982 Paris Spring Salon.
