= 1869 in China =

- Decades: 1840s; 1850s; 1860s; 1870s; 1880s
- See also: Other events of 1869; History of China • Timeline • Years

Events from the year 1869 in China.

== Incumbents ==
- Tongzhi Emperor (9th year)
  - Regent: Empress Dowager Cixi

== Events ==
- Miao Rebellion (1854–73)
- Dungan Revolt (1862–77)
- Panthay Rebellion
- Tongzhi Restoration

== Births ==
- Chan Siu-bak, revolutionary figure and associate of Sun Yat-sen
