= Zeng Guoquan =

Chinese general and Qing dynasty official (1824–1890)

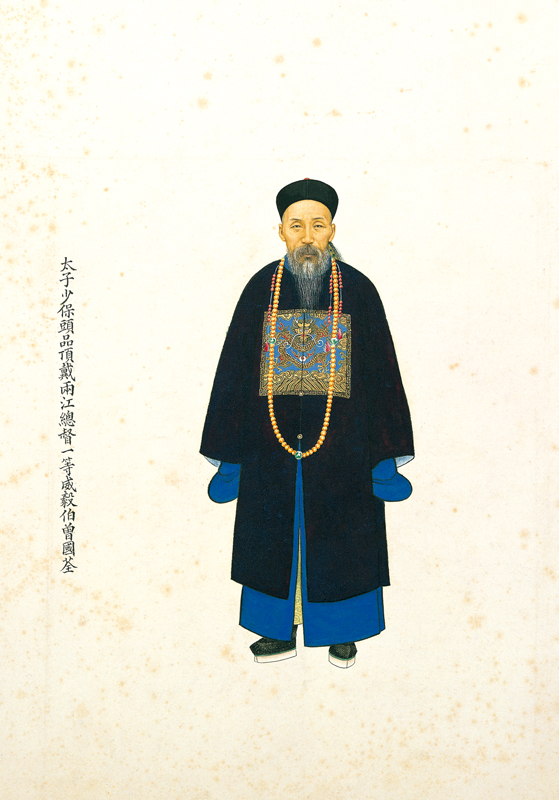

Personal details
- Born: 12 October 1824 Xiangxiang, Hunan Province, Qing Empire
- Died: 13 November 1890 (aged 66) Jiangsu, Qing Empire
- Occupation: Statesman, general

Military service
- Allegiance: Qing Empire
- Branch/service: Xiang Army
- Battles/wars: Taiping Rebellion; Tianjing Massacre

Zeng Guoquan
- Traditional Chinese: 曾國荃
- Simplified Chinese: 曾国荃
Transcriptions
Standard Mandarin
- Hanyu Pinyin: Zēng Guóquán
- Wade–Giles: Tseng Kuo-chüan

Yuanfu (courtesy name)
- Chinese: 沅甫
Transcriptions
Standard Mandarin
- Hanyu Pinyin: Yuánfǔ
- Wade–Giles: Yüan-fu

Shuchun (art name)
- Traditional Chinese: 叔純
- Simplified Chinese: 叔纯
Transcriptions
Standard Mandarin
- Hanyu Pinyin: Shūchún
- Wade–Giles: Shu-ch'un

Zeng Guoquan (12 October 1824 – 13 November 1890), courtesy name Yuanfu, art name Shuchun, was a Chinese official and military leader of the late Qing dynasty. He was the ninth brother of Zeng Guofan, a prominent statesman and general, and a descendant of the philosopher Zengzi. He served in the Xiang Army, a standing military force organised by his brother to counter the Taiping rebels, and was nicknamed "Ninth Marshal" (九帥). He was known for his expertise in siege warfare, particularly the use of trenches, hence he was also nicknamed "Zeng the Iron Container" (曾鐵桶). During the conquest of Tianjing (Nanjing), the capital of the Taiping Heavenly Kingdom, Zeng was notorious for condoning massacres of the city populace, which resulted in him being called "Zeng the Butcher" (曾屠戶).

== Life ==
Zeng was born in Xiangxiang, Changsha Prefecture, Hunan Province. Zengzi was his ancestor. He sat for the imperial examination several times but failed to make the cut. During the Taiping Rebellion, Zeng assisted his brother Zeng Guofan in raising and organising local militias from Hunan to form the Xiang Army to fight the rebels. In 1856, he managed to recruit 3,000 troops from Hunan to reinforce Qing imperial forces at Ji'an, Jiangxi Province. In the following year, they managed to recapture Ji'an from the rebels.

In 1860, Zeng and his troops besieged Anqing and repeatedly fended off rebel reinforcements led by Chen Yucheng. They captured Anqing in the following year. In 1864, they conquered Tianjing (Nanjing), the capital of the Taiping Heavenly Kingdom established by the rebels. Zeng was later appointed as the Provincial Governor of Hubei Province.

During the reign of the Tongzhi Emperor, Zeng, Guo Songtao and others compiled the book Hunan Tong Zhi (湖南通志; Guide to Hunan). In 1863, he sponsored 5,000 silver taels for the publishing of a book, Chuanshan Yishu (船山遺書; Lost Book of Chuanshan), by Wang Fuzhi. He also offered 300 silver taels to Li Shanlan for the printing of Ze Guxi Zhai Suanxue (則古昔齋算學), a book on mathematics written by Li. In 1882, when he learnt that Peng Yulin wanted to establish a Chuanshan Academy in Hengyang, he donated his personal copy of the Chuanshan Yishu and provided funding to help Peng start the school.

In 1867, when the Nian Rebellion was ongoing, Zeng and Li Hongzhang adopted different approaches towards attacking the rebels. Zeng ordered Bao Chao to lead his unit to attack the rebels. Liu Mingchuan was defeated but was saved by Bao Chao. Liu then pushed the blame for the defeat to Bao and Liu Shengzao, resulting in the latter two being punished. Zeng was also forced to retire, ostensibly on the grounds of illness, but actually as punishment for his failure. In 1875, Zeng returned to politics and consecutively served as the Provincial Governor of Shaanxi and Shanxi provinces, and Viceroy of Liangguang. In 1884, he was appointed as Viceroy of Liangjiang. He died in 1890 and was given the posthumous name "Zhongxiang" (忠襄).

== See also ==
- Li Chenden
- Zhu Hongzhang
- Third Battle of Nanking

Government offices
Preceded by Yang Changjun	Viceroy of ShaanGan; 1881	Succeeded by Tan Zhonglin
Preceded by Zhang Shusheng	Viceroy of Liangguang; 1882–1883	Succeeded by Zhang Shusheng
Preceded by Yulu	Viceroy of Liangjiang; 1883–1890	Succeeded by Liu Kunyi
