= Cen Yuying =

Qing dynasty official (1829–1889)

- A portrait of Cen Yuying

Viceroy of Yun-Gui
- In office 1882–1889
- Monarch: Guangxu
- Preceded by: Liu Changyou
- Succeeded by: Wang Wenshao

Personal details
- Born: 26 June 1829 Nalao, Xilin County, Guangxi, Qing China
- Died: 6 June 1889 (aged 59) Kunming, Yunnan, Qing China
- Resting place: Guilin, Guangxi, China
- Children: Cen Chunxuan
- Occupation: Government official, military commander

Military service
- Allegiance: (Qing dynasty) Qing Dynasty
- Battles/wars: Panthay Rebellion; Miao Rebellion (1854–1873); Sino-French War

Cen Yuying (岑毓英; 1829–1889) was a Qing dynasty official and military commander of Zhuang ethnicity. He held several senior provincial posts, including governor-general of Yunnan and Guizhou, and took part in Qing campaigns against forces led by Du Wenxiu during the Muslim Rebellion in Yunnan (1856–1873).

== Early life ==
Cen was born in Xilin County, Guangxi, in 1829. He received a traditional Confucian education and initially served in local militia forces, gaining recognition for his campaigns against bandit groups. In 1856, during the Xianfeng reign, he led militia troops from Guangxi into Yunnan to assist Qing forces in suppressing the Muslim Rebellion in Yunnan. His military service brought him a series of promotions and established his position among the Qing government's leading provincial commanders.

== Suppression of the Muslim Rebellion in Yunnan ==
Cen took part in Qing military operations against Muslim rebel forces in Yunnan from 1856 onward. The rebellion arose amid escalating communal violence, competition over resources and local political tensions. One of its principal leaders, Du Wenxiu, established a political and military base at Dali in western Yunnan.

Cen participated in campaigns to recover cities and strategic positions held by rebel forces. He rose through the provincial administration and became Governor of Yunnan in 1868. The Qing campaign culminated in the capture of Dali in 1873 and the defeat of Du Wenxiu's regime. The restoration of Qing authority followed years of extensive warfare and violence that inflicted severe losses on the province's population.

== Margary Affair and administration of Taiwan ==
In 1875, during Cen's tenure as Governor of Yunnan, British official Augustus Raymond Margary was killed while travelling ahead of a British expedition approaching Yunnan from Burma. The incident, known as the Margary Affair, led to a diplomatic dispute between Britain and the Qing government and contributed to the Chefoo Convention of 1876.

In 1881, Cen was appointed Governor of Fujian and became involved in the administration and defence of Taiwan. His work there included measures to strengthen local infrastructure and coastal defence. He was subsequently appointed Viceroy of Yunnan and Guizhou, returning to a senior position in southwestern China's provincial administration.

== Sino-French War ==
During the Sino-French War of 1884–1885, Cen served as Viceroy of Yunnan and Guizhou and directed Qing military operations on the western front in northern Vietnam. He coordinated troops operating across the frontier and supported campaigns against France forces, including operations around Tuyên Quang and engagements in the region of Lào Cai.

== Later life and death ==
Cen remained a senior official in southwestern China after the Sino-French War. He continued to hold high provincial office and received further honours from the Qing court. He died in 1889 and was posthumously honoured with the name Xiangqin (襄勤). His son Cen Chunxuan later became a prominent official during the final years of the Qing dynasty and the early Republic of China.
