= Zhou Chiheng =

Chinese politician (1915–1986)

Governor of Jilin
- In office September 1949 – January 1952
- Succeeded by: Li Youwen

Personal details
- Born: 1915 Shaoxing, Zhejiang, China
- Died: 1986 (aged 70–71)
- Party: Chinese Communist Party

Zhou Chiheng (Chinese: 周持衡) (1915–1986) was a People's Republic of China politician. He was born in Shaoxing, Zhejiang Province. He was governor of Jilin Province.

Preceded by New office	Governor of Jilin; 1949–1952	Succeeded by Li Youwen
