= Yu Yifu =

Chinese politician

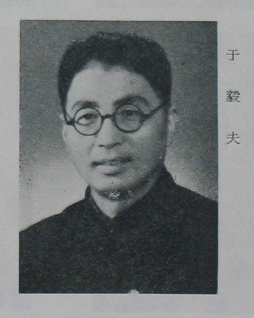
Yu Yifu Portrait

Yu Yifu (Chinese: 于毅夫) (May 19, 1903 – June 11, 1982), original name Yu Chengze (Chinese: 于成泽), was a Chinese politician. He was born in Shuangchengbao, Jilin Province. He attended Tongji University. He was governor of Heilongjiang Province.

Preceded by New office	Governor of Heilongjiang	Succeeded by Zhao Dezun
