= Li Youwen =

Chinese politician

Governor of Jilin
- In office January 1952 – March 1968
- Preceded by: Zhou Chiheng
- Succeeded by: Wang Huaixiang

Personal details
- Born: 1901 Liaoyang County, Liaoning, China
- Died: 1984 (aged 82–83)
- Party: Chinese Communist Party

Li Youwen (Chinese: 栗又文) (1901–1984) was a Chinese politician. He was born in Liaoyang County, Liaoning Province. He served as Governor of Jilin Province. He was a delegate to the 5th National People's Congress (1978–1983). He was the first People's Congress Chairman of Jilin.

Li graduated from the Moscow Sun Yat-sen University. He was purged in March 1968 during the Cultural Revolution.

| Preceded by Zhou Chiheng | Governor of Jilin; 1952–1968 | Succeeded by Wang Huaixiang |
| Preceded by New office | People's Congress Chairman of Jilin | Succeeded by Yu Ke |
