= Shen Baozhen =

Chinese Qing Dynasty official (1820–1879)

Hereditary First Class adaha hafan Shen Baozhen
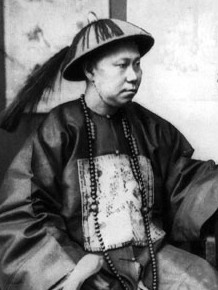

Viceroy of Liangjiang
- In office 1875–1879
- Preceded by: Liu Kunyi
- Succeeded by: Liu Kunyi

Governor of Jiangxi
- In office 1861–1865
- Preceded by: Yuke
- Succeeded by: Sun Changfu (acting)

Personal details
- Born: Shen Zhenzong (沈振宗); 9 April 1820 Minhou, Fuzhou, Fujian, China
- Died: 18 December 1879 (aged 59) Jiangning, Jiangsu, China
- Relations: Lin Zexu (father-in-law)
- Education: Jinshi degree in the Imperial Examination
- Occupation: Politician

Shen Baozhen
- Traditional Chinese: 沈葆楨
- Simplified Chinese: 沈葆桢
Transcriptions
Standard Mandarin
- Hanyu Pinyin: Shěn Bǎozhēn
- Wade–Giles: Shen Pao-chen
Southern Min
- Hokkien POJ: Sím Pó-cheng
Eastern Min
- Fuzhou BUC: Sīng Bō̤-dĭng

Shen Baozhen (1820–1879), formerly romanized Shen Pao-chen, was an official during the Qing dynasty.

== Biography ==
Born in Minhou in Fujian province, he obtained the highest degree in the imperial examinations in 1847 and was soon appointed to the Hanlin Academy.

His great administrative abilities attracted the attention of Zeng Guofan, who enlisted him in the effort to suppress the Taiping Rebellion.

Following the suppression of the rebellion in 1864, Shen became actively involved in the Self-strengthening movement and later worked on the Foochow Arsenal in Fuzhou. There he established the Qiushi Tang Yiju (求是堂藝局), which became the Foochow Arsenal School, and utilized the skill of French technicians and workers – notably Prosper Giquel – to construct modern warships for the Imperial Navy prior to the destruction of the arsenal and the fleet itself during the Battle of Fuzhou in the 1883–1885 Sino-French War. Concurrently, he also improved the land tax collection system in Jiangxi province.

He also took part in obtaining a peace settlement with Japan, following the Mudan Incident and Japan's invasion of Taiwan in response to imperial disavowals of sovereignty over the islands' native tribes. He was appointed as the Viceroy of Liangjiang in 1875. He personally visited Taiwan and reformed its administration. The island had consisted of a single prefecture at Taiwan (Tainan); the three subprefectures of Tamsui, Penghu and Kemalan; and the four counties of Taiwan, Fengshan, Chiayi, and Changhua. Shen elevated 2 prefectures, 4 subprefectures, and 4 counties, making the territories smaller and easier to administer. He also launched a military campaign against the aborigines and initiated a building program in southern Taiwan intended to establish a stronger Qing presence and prevent Japanese or European colonization of the area. He died in office in 1879. He was posthumously awarded the title of Senior Guardian of the Heir Apparent.

He is chiefly remembered in European histories for his belated opposition to the Woosung Road Company's railroad, which he purchased and dismantled in its first year of operation, limiting Shanghai's development for twenty years. Shanghai remained unconnected to China's growing rail network until the line's reconstruction in 1898 and its subsequent extension to Nanjing in 1908.

Shen was married to Lin Puqing (林普晴; 1821–77), the third daughter of Lin Zexu. She exhibited great courage and determined tenacity when under siege by the Taiping rebels at Guangxin when she bandaged troops, cooked for them and cut her finger to write a message in blood.

Government offices
Preceded by Liu Kunyi	Viceroy of Liangjiang; 1875–1879	Succeeded by Liu Kunyi
