= Liu Kunyi =

Chinese politician (1830–1902)

Viceroy of Liangguang
- In office 1875–1879
- Preceded by: Yinghan
- Succeeded by: Zhang Shusheng

Personal details
- Born: January 21, 1830
- Died: October 6, 1902 (aged 72)
- Occupation: Politician

Liu Kunyi (Chinese: 劉坤一; pinyin: Liú Kūnyī) (January 21, 1830 – October 6, 1902) was a Chinese official who came to prominence during the government suppression of the Taiping Rebellion and was active in the following Self-Strengthening Movement in the second half of the nineteenth century, the late Qing dynasty. He was native of Xinning County, Hunan.

== Biography ==
Born in Xinning County, Hunan, Liu held a senior licentiate degree (jinshi) from the imperial examination system. He entered the Hunan army in 1855, and worked under Li Hongzhang during the suppression of the Taiping Rebellion. In recognition of his services, he was created a baron and awarded the position of governor of Jiangxi, a role in which he served from 1865 to 1874.

In 1875, he was given the position of Viceroy of Liangjiang, but was almost immediately transferred to the post of Viceroy of Liangguang, where he remained for the next four years. He was then returned to the former post, where he served until 1881.

In addition to his regular duties in this post, he was asked in 1880 to advise the emperor on Chinese diplomatic policy toward Russia and Japan. After the French invasion of Vietnam, he also advised the emperor on that matter. Liu spent the next several years in retirement, but was recalled to the same post as Viceroy of Liangjiang in 1890.

He contained several anti-missionary movements for the next four years, until he was made Imperial Commissioner in charge of troops at Shanhaiguan, a strategic pass between Zhili and Fengtian.

Liu urged the imperial court to prolong the First Sino-Japanese War, hoping for a favorable outcome for the Chinese side, but returned to his post after the Treaty of Shimonoseki was signed in 1895.

In 1900, Liu gained distinction for controlling the Boxer Rebellion and not following the Imperial edict to exterminate all foreigners in China. Liu Kunyi died in 1902, shortly after submitting three joint memorials on reform to the Emperor.

Government offices
Preceded by Li Zongxi	Viceroy of Liangjiang; 1875	Succeeded by Shen Baozhen
Preceded by Yinghan	Viceroy of Liangguang; 1875-1879	Succeeded by Zhang Shusheng
Preceded by Shen Baozhen	Viceroy of Liangjiang; 1879-1881	Succeeded by Peng Yulin
Preceded by Zeng Guoquan	Viceroy of Liangjiang; 1890-1902	Succeeded by Zhang Zhidong
