= Pei Lisheng =

Chinese politician

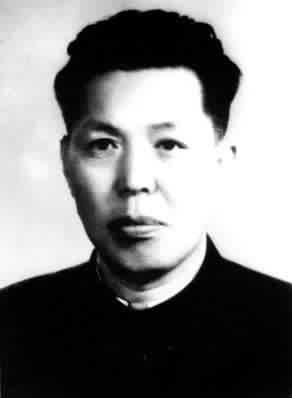

Pei Lisheng (Chinese: 裴丽生; October 31, 1906 – March 18, 2000) was a Chinese politician. He was born in Yuanqu County, Shanxi Province. He was a graduate of Tsinghua University. He was twice the governor of his home province (September 1950 – February 1951, May 1952 – April 1956). He was a delegate to the 3rd National People's Congress and a member of the 5th and 6th Chinese People's Political Consultative Conference.

Preceded by Cheng Zihua	Governor of Shanxi; September 1950 – February 1951	Succeeded by Lai Ruoyu
Preceded by Lai Ruoyu	Governor of Shanxi; May 1952 – April 1956	Succeeded by Wang Shiying
