= Deng Baoshan =

Chinese politician

- Born: 1894; Tianshui, Gansu, China
- Died: November 27, 1968 (aged 73–74); Beijing

Deng Baoshan (Chinese: 鄧寶珊; 1894 – November 27, 1968) was a Chinese politician. He was born in Tianshui, Gansu Province. He was commander of the New 1st Army. During the Xi'an Incident of 1936, he supported Zhang Xueliang and Yang Hucheng. He was the 2nd governor of his home province after the creation of the People's Republic.

Preceded by Wang Shitai	Governor of Gansu	Succeeded by Xian Henghan
