= Wu Zhipu =

First CPC governor of Henan (1906–1967)

Wu Zhipu (Chinese: 吴芝圃; 1906–1967) was the first CPC governor of Henan and CPC Committee Secretary of Henan. He was born in Henan.

Wu pressured his subordinates to harvest grain well in excess of official quotas during the Great Leap Forward, claiming 450 million jin was produced in 1958 when in reality villagers only harvested 281 million jin. Wu was tortured and died during the cultural revolution partly because of his role in the famine.

Political offices
New title	Governor of Henan; 1949–1962	Succeeded by Wen Minsheng
Preceded by Pan Fusheng	Party Secretary of Henan; 1958	Succeeded by Liu Jianxun
