= Zhang Shusheng =

Chinese general during the Qing dynasty (1824–1884)

Zhang Shusheng (traditional Chinese: 張樹聲; simplified Chinese: 张树声; pinyin: Zhāng Shùshēng) (1824-1884) was a Chinese official of the Qing Dynasty. He was one of the Huai Army's vice leaders, and his young brother Zhang Shushan (張樹珊) was also a Lieutenant General, but died in a battle against the Taiping Rebellion in De'an County in 1867.

Government offices
| Preceded by Liu Kunyi | Viceroy of Liangguang; 1879─1882 | Succeeded by Zeng Guoquan |
| Preceded by Zeng Guoquan | Viceroy of Liangguang; 1883─1884 | Succeeded by Zhang Zhidong |
