= Ding Baozhen =

Chinese official (1820–1886)

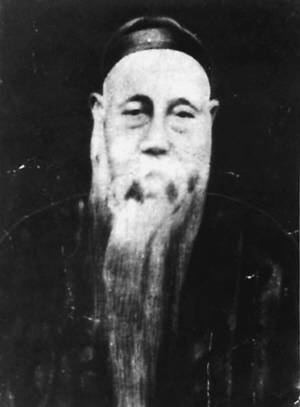

Governor General (Viceroy) of Sichuan Province
- In office 27 October 1876 – 21 April 1886
- Preceded by: Li Hanzhang
- Succeeded by: Liu Bingzhang

Governor of Shandong Province
- In office 28 February 1867 – 27 October 1876

Personal details
- Born: 29 May 1821 Pingyuan, Guizhou Province
- Died: 21 April 1886 (aged 64) Chengdu, Sichuan Province

Ding Baozhen (simplified Chinese: 丁宝桢; traditional Chinese: 丁寶楨; pinyin: Dīng Bǎozhēn; Wade–Giles: Ting Pao-chen) (29 May 1821 – 21 April 1886), courtesy name Weihuang (稚璜), was a Chinese official who lived in the late Qing dynasty and served as the governor of Sichuan Province.

The Sichuan dish Kung Pao chicken (or Gongbao chicken) was named after his nickname, "Ding Gongbao" (丁宮保). "Gongbao" was the short form of an appointment he held, "Taizi Shaobao" (太子少保; roughly translates to "Crown Prince's Tutor"), while "Ding" was his family name.

== Life ==
Born in Pingyuan, Guizhou Province in 1820, Ding was appointed a government official in 1854 after an outstanding performance in the annual imperial examination. He served as xunfu of Shandong Province and later as governor of Sichuan province. In the second year of the Guangxu period in the Qing dynasty, he supervised the reconstruction of the Dujiangyan Irrigation Project. A statue of him is displayed at Erwang Temple in Dujiangyan City.
