= Tongzhi Restoration =

Attempted reform in China, 1860–1874

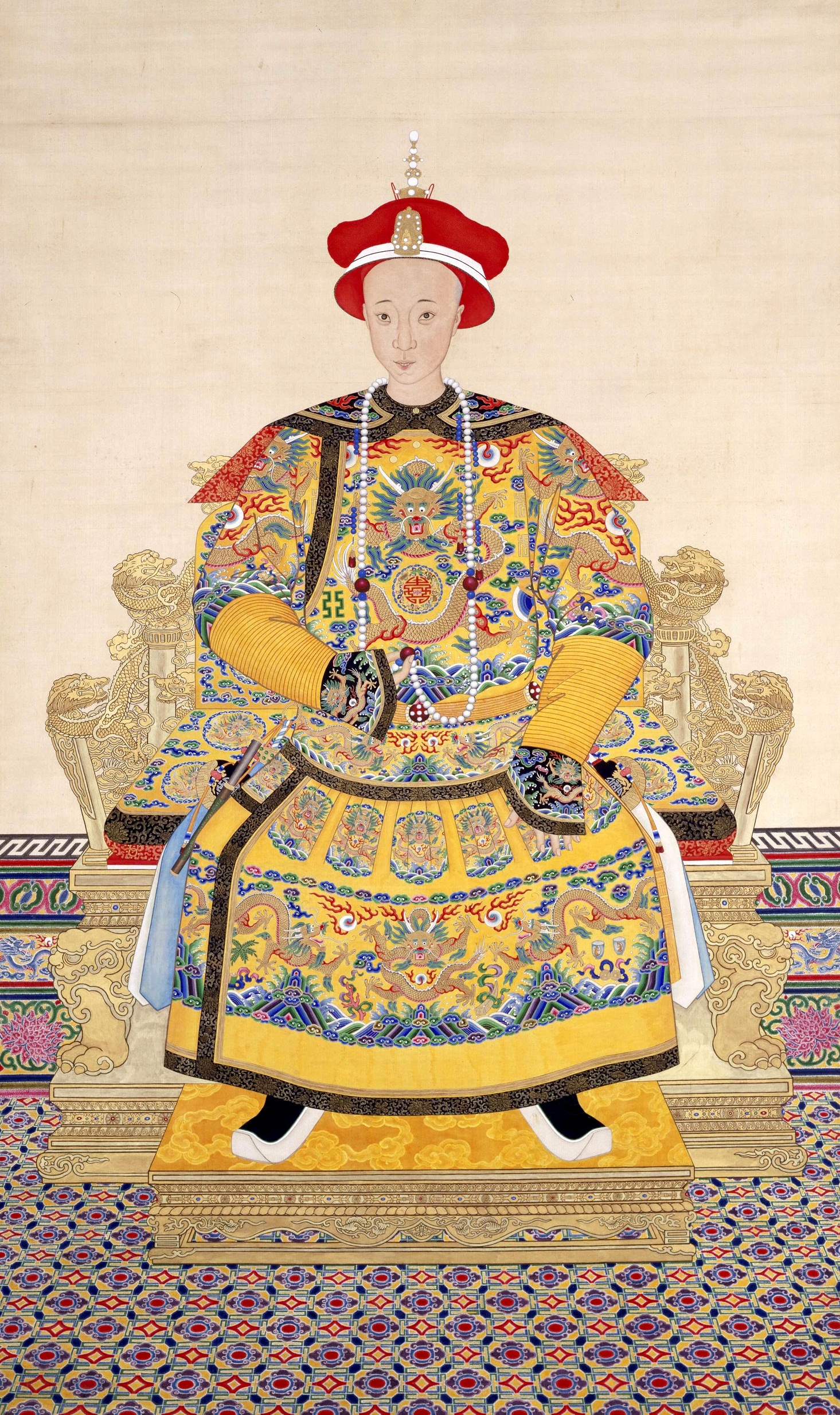
Tongzhi Emperor, after whom the restoration is named.

The Tongzhi Restoration (simplified Chinese: 同治中兴; traditional Chinese: 同治中興; pinyin: Tóngzhì Zhōngxīng; Wade–Giles: T'ung-chih Chung-hsing; c. 1860–1874) was an attempt to arrest the dynastic decline of the Qing dynasty by restoring the traditional order. The harsh realities of the Opium Wars, the unequal treaties, and the mid-century mass uprisings of the Taiping Rebellion caused Qing officials to recognize the need to strengthen China. The Tongzhi Restoration was named for the Tongzhi Emperor (r. 1861–1875), and was engineered by the young emperor's mother, the Empress Dowager Cixi (1835–1908). The restoration, however, which applied "practical knowledge" while reaffirming the old mentality, was not a genuine program of modernization. Academics are divided as to whether the Tongzhi Restoration arrested the dynastic decline or merely delayed its inevitable occurrence.

== Self-Strengthening Movement ==
The Tongzhi Restoration was a direct result of the Self-Strengthening Movement led by the statesmen Zeng Guofan (who became viceroy) and Li Hongzhang to revitalize government and improve cultural and economic conditions. The Self-Strengthening Movement's most successful project was its first, the establishment in 1861 of a foreign office to handle diplomacy. Foreign-language schools were established in 1862 in English and French, but enrollment was quite small because ambitious young men preferred to immerse themselves in preparation for the examination on Confucianism. Arsenals were established in 1865 in 1867, and a naval dockyard in 1866. Their products performed very poorly in wars against European powers, but did give the government superior firepower against peasant uprisings. A machine factory was established in 1870, and students were sent for advanced education to the United States starting in 1872. Coal mines were opened in 1877. The Beiyang Fleet was launched in 1888 to replace the fleet sunk by the French in 1884. Professor Immanuel C. Y. Hsu concludes that the reforms were basically superficial and mostly limited to armaments and machinery. There was no attempt to exploit Western ideas or methods, and so it "barely scratched the surface of modernization, without achieving a breakthrough in industrialization." Two major defeats in wars with France and Japan proved that China could not defend itself. The reforms were poorly organized, with little direction from the royal court, leaving it up to poorly equipped provincial authorities who competed with each other.

== Historiography ==
The chief historian of the Tongzhi Restoration, Mary C. Wright described it as the "last stand of Chinese conservatism", arguing that "not only a dynasty but also a civilization which appeared to have collapsed was revived to last for another sixty years by the extraordinary efforts of extraordinary men in the 1860s." John K. Fairbank wrote, "That the Qing managed to survive both domestic and international attacks is due largely to the policy and leadership changes known as the Qing Restoration."

== See also ==
- Self-Strengthening Movement
- Meiji Restoration
