= 1934 in China =

- Decades: 1910s; 1920s; 1930s; 1940s; 1950s
- See also: Other events of 1934; History of China • Timeline • Years

Events from the year 1934 in China.

== Incumbents ==
- President: Lin Sen
- Premier: Wang Jingwei
- Vice Premier: Kung Hsiang-hsi

== Events ==
- April 10 — Fifth Encirclement Campaign against the Jiangxi Soviet: Nationalists begin the attack on the Communist stronghold of Guangchang.
- April 19 — Communists launch a failed attack on Nationalists at Daluoshan. Communist strongholds at Ganzhu and Yanfuzhang taken by Nationalists.
- April 27 — Nationalists capture Guangchang, inflicting 5,500 casualties on the Communists.
- October - Start of Long March

== Births ==
=== January ===
- January 1 — Mona Fong, Hong Kong film producer and manager (d. 2017)
- January 15 — Mao Jiangsen, virologist (d. 2023)

=== February ===
- February 24 — Zhong Wanxie, civil engineer and physicist (d. 2023)

=== March ===
- March 10 — Fou Ts'ong, pianist (d. 2020)
- March 29 — Mei Baojiu, contemporary Peking opera artist (d. 2016)
- Huang Xiaode, exegete and lexicographer (d. 2020)

=== April ===
- April 20 — Ji Liangnian, chemist (d. 2024)
- April 24 — Yan Chongnian, historian

=== June ===
- June 30 — Zhang Xinshi, plant ecologist (d. 2020)

=== July ===
- July 17 — Lucio Tan, Chinese-Filipino billionaire businessman, educator

=== August ===
- August 2 — Ma Ji, xiangsheng comedian (d. 2006)
- August 6 — Cao Chunxiao, materials scientist (d. 2023)

=== September ===
- September 17 — Li Ruihuan, 6th Chairman of the Chinese People's Political Consultative Conference

=== October ===
- October 1 — Zou Deci, city planning engineer (d. 2020)
- October 5 — Kenneth Tsang, Hong Kong actor (d. 2022)
- October 8 — Chor Yuen, Hong Kong film director, screenwriter and actor (d. 2022)

=== November ===
- November 2 — Yuan Quan, chemist (d. 2023)

=== December ===
- December 5 — He Jing, hydraulic engineer and politician (d. 2019)
- December 14 — Lam Sheung Yee, Hong Kong football defender, coach and announcer (d. 2009)
- December 16 — Meng Zhizhong, satellite engineer (d. 2019)
- December 17 — Shan Tianfang, pingshu performer (d. 2018)
- December 26 — Lin Dai, actress (d. 1964)
- Song Hanliang, 7th Secretary of the Xinjiang Uyghur Autonomous Regional Committee of the Chinese Communist Party (d. 2000)

=== Dates unknown ===
- Hung Nam, actress and film producer

== Deaths ==
- January 3 — Wu Chaoshu, former Minister of Foreign Affairs (b. 1887)
- January 6 — Zhang Peiyuan, nationalist general and commander of the Ili Garrison (b. 1894)
- January 24 — Li Shuwen, master practitioner of Bajiquan (b. 1862)
- February 15 — Ai Xia, left-wing silent film actress and screenwriter (b. 1912)
- March 4 — Kin Yamei, Chinese born American-raised doctor, hospital administrator, educator and nutrition expert (b. 1864)
- March 15 — Davidson Black, Canadian paleoanthropologist and former Chairman of the Geological Survey of China (b. 1884)
- May 13 — Lu Yin, feminist writer (b. 1898)
- June 30 — Lo Chueng-shiu, prominent Hong Kong businessman and the founder of the Lo family, an influential family in Hong Kong (b. 1869)
- July 14 — Liu Bannong, poet and linguist (b. 1891)
- August 29 — Yeung Hok-ling, revolutionary and one of the Four Bandits (b. 1868)
- September 14 — Wang Zhanyuan, general (b. 1861)
- September 28 — Li Jingfang, Qing dynasty statesman (b. 1855)
- October 28 — Li Shicen, philosopher and anarchist (b. 1892)
- November 13 — Shi Liangcai, journalist (b. 1880)
- November 24 — Ji Hongchang, general and patriot (b. 1895)
- December 23 — Chan Siu-bak, revolutionary and one of the Four Bandits (b. 1869)

=== Dates unknown ===
- Ma Wanfu, founder of the Yihewani (b. 1849)
