= 1938 in China =

- Decades: 1910s; 1920s; 1930s; 1940s; 1950s
- See also: Other events of 1938; History of China • Timeline • Years

Events in the year 1938 in China.

== Incumbents ==
- President - Lin Sen
- Premier - Kung Hsiang-hsi (Dr. H. H. Kung)
- Vice Premier - Zhang Qun
- Foreign Minister - Wang Chonghui

== Events ==
=== January ===
- 1 January - The KMT Central Standing Committee resolved at its 62nd meeting, Chiang Kai-shek resigned, the election of Kong Xiangxi as the executive president, leaving the post of vice president of the Executive Yuan, Zhang Qun successor.
- 24 January- Han Fuju was sentenced to death and executed in Wuchang at 7 pm.
- January–June - Battle of Northern and Eastern Henan

=== February ===
- 18 February - The Imperial Japanese Army Air Service launched air strikes against Wuhan.(Battle of Wuhan; Chinese: 武汉会战)

=== March ===
- 24 March – 1 May - Battle of Xuzhou
- 24 March – 7 April - Battle of Taierzhuang

=== April ===
- 29 April - To celebrate emperor Hirohito's birthday, the Imperial Japanese Army Air Service conducted a massive bombing of Wuhan. (Battle of Wuhan; Chinese: 武汉会战)

=== May ===
- May - Battle of Lanfeng
- 10 May – 12 May - Amoy Operation

=== June ===
- 6 June - the Japanese forces capture Kaifeng, Henan
- 13 June - the Japanese landing forces occupy Anqing City, Anhui Province.

=== October ===
- 1 October to 11 October - Battle of Wanjialing
- October–December - Canton Operation

=== November ===
- 13 November - 1938 Changsha Fire

== Births ==
=== January ===
- January 17
  - Tang Jiaxuan, 8th Minister of Foreign Affairs of China
  - Zhu Xijuan, film actress

=== February ===
- February 3 — Choekyi Gyaltsen, 10th Panchen Lama (d. 1989)
- February 16 — Wu Guixian, first female Vice Premier of China
- February 26 — Yang Shengnan, historian and palaeographer (d. 2019)

=== April ===
- April 8 — Lui Ming-wah, member of the Legislative Council of Hong Kong
- April 11 — Fu Zhihuan, 11th Minister of Railways of China
- April 20 — Chiung Yao, Taiwanese writer and producer (d. 2024)
- He Jingtang, prominent architect

=== May ===
- Jia Chunwang, 8th Procurator-General of the Supreme People's Procuratorate

=== June ===
- June 7 — Gu Long, Hong Kong-born Taiwanese novelist (d. 1985)

=== July ===
- Shu Huiguo, politician

=== August ===
- Raidi, politician

=== September ===
- September 28 — Huang Ju, former Vice Premier of China (d. 2007)

=== October ===
- October 18 — Wu Guanzheng, 9th Secretary of the Central Commission for Discipline Inspection of the Chinese Communist Party
- October 26 — Tom Meschery, American basketball player and coach
- October 30 — Shao Hua, photographer and wife of Mao Anqing, second son of Mao Zedong (d. 2008)
- Li Qiyan, 10th Mayor of Beijing (d. 2020)

=== November ===
- November 6 — Jin Zhanpeng, scientist (d. 2020)
- November 17 — Wu Yi, former Vice Premier of China
- November 20 — Wan Huilin, physical chemist (d. 2024)
- Lu Ruihua, 14th Governor of Guangdong

=== December ===
- December 4 — Chin Han, Hong Kong actor, director, screenwriter and producer
- December 24 — Wang Mengshu, tunnel and railway engineer (d. 2018)
- December 28 — Chen Sisi, film and theater actress (d. 2007)
- Zeng Peiyan, member of the 16th Politburo of the Chinese Communist Party

== Deaths ==
- January 20 — Liu Xiang, warlord of Sichuan (b. 1890)
- January 24 — Han Fuju, Nationalist general (b. 1890)
- March 14 — Wang Mingzhang, Nationalist general (b. 1893)
- March 28 — Zheng Xiaoxu, statesman, diplomat and calligrapher (b. 1860)
- May 9 — Huang Tzu, composer (b. 1904)
- May 15 — Cao Kun, warlord and politician (b. 1862)
- June 8 — Tieliang, general in the Qing dynasty and one of the main members of the Royalist Party (b. 1863)
- September 30 — Tang Shaoyi, 1st Premier of the Republic of China (b. 1862)
- November 4 — Jiang Baili, military writer, strategist, trainer and army general (b. 1882)

== See also ==
- List of Chinese films of the 1930s
