= 1925 in China =

- Decades: 1900s; 1910s; 1920s; 1930s; 1940s
- See also: Other events of 1925; History of China • Timeline • Years

Events in the year 1925 in China.

== Incumbents ==
- President: Duan Qirui
- Premier: Xu Shiying (from 26 December)

== Events ==
- January – Election of the 4th Central Bureau of the Chinese Communist Party
- 11 February – Establishment of the Prefecture Apostolic of Tsingtao
- 1 May – Establishment of the All-China Federation of Trade Unions
- 30 May – Beginning of the May Thirtieth Movement
- June – Start of the Canton–Hong Kong strike
- November – Start of the Anti-Fengtian War
- Establishment of the 4th Central Executive Committee of the Chinese Communist Party
- Establishment of the National Revolutionary Army

=== Undated ===
- Changzhou No.1 High School is established

== Births ==
- 11 January — Hualing Nieh Engle, novelist, fiction writer and poet (d. 2024)
- 2 April — Ye Minghan, physicist (d. 2024)
- 25 May — Liu Ruozhuang, physical chemist (d. 2020)
- 13 July — Huang Zongying, actress (d. 2020)
- 9 August — Anna Hannevik, Chinese-born Norwegian Salvation Army officer (d. 2025)
- 23 October — Kwan Hoi-san, Hong Kong actor (d. 2006)
- 26 October — Chiang Chao-shen, calligrapher, painter and seal engraver (d. 1996)
- 2 November — Zhang Youshang, biochemist (d. 2022)
- 18 November — Peng Shilu, nuclear engineer (d. 2021)

== Deaths ==
- 5 March — Gao Junyu, member of the 2nd Central Executive Committee of the Chinese Communist Party (b. 1896)
- 12 March — Sun Yat-sen, 1st Provisional President of the Republic of China (b. 1866)
- 22 March — Duan Zhigui, general of the Anhui clique (b. 1869)
- 10 April — Hu Jingyi, general and warlord of Henan (b. 1892)
- 17 April
  - Wong Fei-hung, martial artist and physician (b. 1847)
  - Tan Haoming, former military Governor of Guangxi (b. 1871)
- 19 August — Wang Jinmei, revolutionary and founding member of the Chinese Communist Party (b. 1898)
- 20 August — Liao Zhongkai, financier and leader of the Kuomintang (b. 1877)
- 18 September — Li Jingxi, 7th Premier of the Republic of China (b. 1857)
- 29 December — Xu Shuzheng, prominent warlord of the Anhui clique (b. 1880)
