= 1941 in China =

- Decades: 1920s; 1930s; 1940s; 1950s; 1960s
- See also: Other events of 1941; History of China • Timeline • Years

Events in the year 1941 in China.

== Incumbents ==
- President: Lin Sen
- Premier: Chiang Kai-shek
- Vice Premier: Kung Hsiang-hsi
- Foreign Minister: Wang Chonghui until April, then Guo Taiqi

== Events ==
=== January ===
- January 7–13 - New Fourth Army incident
- January 30–March 1 - Battle of South Henan

=== March ===
- March - Western Hubei Operation
- March 14–April 9 - Battle of Shanggao

=== May ===
- May 7–27 - Battle of South Shanxi

=== July ===
- 1 July - Germany and Italy both Recognized "Wang Jingwei regime" (Nanjing)
- 2 July - the ROC Ministry of Foreign Affairs (Chongqing)), Announced the severance of diplomatic relations with Germany and Italy

=== September ===
- September 6 – October 8 - Battle of Changsha (1941)

=== December ===
- 9 December- The government of Republic of China (The Nationalist Government (Chongqing)) declared war on the Axis powers (Japan, Germany and Italy).

== Births ==
=== January ===
- January 1 — Du Yulu, actor (d. 2020)
- January 6 — Yeung Kai-yin, Hong Kong civil servant and businessman (d. 2007)
- January 8 — Dai Qing, journalist and activist
- Huang Zhendong, 18th Secretary of the Chongqing Municipal Committee of the Chinese Communist Party
- Chen Kuiyuan, politician

=== February ===
- February 8 — Yang Hongji, actor
- February 14 — Mao Yuanxin, former politician

=== March ===
- March 18 — James Wong Jim, Hong Kong Cantopop lyricist and songwriter (d. 2004)
- March 28 — Philip Fang, Hong Kong simultaneous interpretation specialist, United Nations official (d. 2013)
- March 31 — Dai Bingguo, politician and diplomat

=== July ===
- July 14 — Wang Zhaoguo, politician
- July 22 — Wu Bangguo, 8th Chairman of the Standing Committee of the National People's Congress (d. 2024)

=== August ===
- August 6 — Wen Xingyu, comedian and director (d. 2007)

=== November ===
- Chai Songyue, politician

=== December ===
- December 21 — Lo Hoi-pang, Hong Kong actor and singer
- Pu Haiqing, 14th Mayor of Chongqing

== Deaths ==
- January 15 — Yuan Guoping, communist army officer (b. 1906)
- March 14
  - Xiang Ying, political chief of staff of the New Fourth Army and early founding member of the Chinese Communist Party (b. 1898)
  - Zhou Zikun, deputy chief of staff of the New Fourth Army (b. 1901)
- April 24 — Xie Jinyuan, nationalist military officer (b. 1905)
- August 4 — Xu Dishan, author, translator and folklorist (b. 1893)
- September 12 — Jin Shuren, 2nd Provincial Chairman of Xinjiang (b. 1879)

=== Dates unknown ===
- Jia Deyao, 18th Premier of the Republic of China (b. 1880)

== See also ==
- List of Chinese films of the 1940s
- List of years in the environment
