= 1937 in China =

- Decades: 1910s; 1920s; 1930s; 1940s; 1950s
- See also: Other events of 1937; History of China • Timeline • Years

Events in the year 1937 in China.

== Incumbents ==
- President: Lin Sen
- Premier: Chiang Kai-shek
- Vice Premier: Kung Hsiang-hsi
- Foreign Minister: Zhang Qun until March 4, then Wang Chonghui

== Events ==
=== January ===
- January 14 — Wang Jingwei took a German passenger boat to Shanghai.
- January 19 — Hunan University was changed to National Hunan University, and the Ministry of Education appointed Pi Zongshi as the principal.
- January 28 — Manuel L. Quezon, President of the Philippines, arrived in Shanghai and departed the next day.

=== July to December ===
- July 7–9 — Marco Polo Bridge Incident
- early July-early August – Battle of Beiping–Tianjin
- August — Operation Chahar
- August–December — Beiping–Hankou Railway Operation
- August–November — Tianjin–Pukou Railway Operation
- 13 August – 26 November — Battle of Shanghai
- September 1 – November 9 —Battle of Taiyuan
- September 13 – November 11 — Battle of Xinkou
- September 24 – September 25 — Battle of Pingxingguan
- October 26 – November 1 — Defense of Sihang Warehouse
- December 13 — Nanking Massacre

== Births ==
- February 5 — Wang Xuan, computer scientist (d. 2006)
- March 28 — Ye Keming, engineer (d. 2021)
- May 17 — Han Dingxiang, underground Roman Catholic bishop of Yongnian (d. 2007)
- June 22 — Chen Li-an, Taiwanese mathematician and former politician
- July 2 — Gu Shengying, classical concert pianist (d. 1967)
- July 7 — Tung Chee-hwa, 1st Chief Executive of Hong Kong
- July 11 — Pai Hsien-yung, Taiwanese writer
- July 13 — Xu Huanshan, actor and film director
- July 24 — Betty Loh Ti, Hong Kong actress (d. 1968)
- July 28 — Wang Zhonggao, vascular surgeon (d. 2023)
- August 1 — Tseten Dolma, ethnic Tibetan soprano
- September 29 — Nina Wang, Asia's richest woman (d. 2007)
- October 25 — Guo Guirong, lieutenant general in the People's Liberation Army
- October 26 — Qian Qihu, military engineer
- November 1 — Zhou Chaochen, computer scientist
- December 11 — Xu Kuangdi, 11th Mayor of Shanghai
- December 26 — Gu Yue, actor (d. 2005)

=== Dates unknown ===
- Liu Caipin
- Yu Xiaosong

== Deaths ==
- January 8 — Pamela Werner, child of retired British diplomat E. T. C. Werner (b. 1917)
- July 28
  - Zhao Dengyu, general (b. 1898)
  - Tong Linge, military officer (b. 1892)
- October 15 — Hao Mengling, general (b. 1892)
- November 21 — Gao Zhihang, WWII flying ace (b. 1907)
- December 1 — Rao Guohua, general from the Sichuan clique (b. 1894)
- December 3 — Yue Yiqin, WWII flying ace (b. 1914)
- December 25 — Xiong Xiling, 4th Premier of the Republic of China (b. 1870)

=== Dates unknown ===
- Ma Zhongying, Chinese Muslim warlord (b. 1910)

== See also ==
- List of Chinese films of the 1930s
