= 1939 in China =

- Decades: 1910s; 1920s; 1930s; 1940s; 1950s
- See also: Other events of 1939; History of China • Timeline • Years

Events in the year 1939 in China.

== Incumbents ==
- President: Lin Sen
- Premier: H.H. Kung (until December 11), Chiang Kai-shek (from December 11)
- Vice Premier: Chang Ch'ün (until December 11), Kung Hsiang-hsi (from December 11)
- Foreign Minister: Wang Ch'ung-hui

== Events ==
=== January ===
- January — The British Hong Kong Government had announced that it will ban the export of weapons and ammunition to the Republic of China via the land boundary of Hong Kong.

=== February ===
- February — Hainan Island Operation
- February 21 — Shenzhen and Lo Wu were bombed by Japanese army, 30 people were killed or injured, Japanese government paid 20,000 HK$ to the British Hong Kong government.
- February — The Hong Kong Government negotiated with the Japanese army, resume shipping between Hong Kong and Guangzhou.

=== March ===
- March 17-May 9 — Battle of Nanchang
- March — Battle of Xiushui River

=== April ===
- April 20-May 24 — Battle of Suixian–Zaoyang

=== June ===
- June — Swatow Operation
- June 14-August 20 — Tientsin Incident

=== September ===
- September 13-October 8 — Battle of Changsha (1939)

=== December ===
This month, Chongqing National Government required the assembly of four commercial transport aircraft provided by US companies in Hong Kong, which was rejected by the British Hong Kong Government.

== Births ==
=== February ===
- February 19 — Erin Pizzey, author and founder of the first domestic violence shelter in the modern world
- February 28 — Daniel C. Tsui, Chinese-American physicist
- Bao Xuding, 15th Mayor of Chongqing

=== March ===
- March 10 — Li Shuangjiang, military singer
- March 15 — Xiong Guangkai, general in the People's Liberation Army
- March 29 — Qian Shugen, general in the People's Liberation Army

=== July ===
- July 13 — Sha Yexin, playwright and short story writer (d. 2018)
- July 16 — Zhang Lichang, 12th Secretary of the Chongqing Municipal Committee of the Chinese Communist Party (d. 2008)
- July 30 — Zeng Qinghong, 7th Vice President of China

=== August ===
- August 16 — Yu Chenghui, actor, action director and martial artist (d. 2015)
- Zhang Delin, 16th Secretary of the Chongqing Municipal Committee of the Chinese Communist Party

=== September ===
- September 10 — Kong Hon, Hong Kong actor and director (d. 2017)

=== November ===
- November 10 — Zhu Nenghong, astronomical optical telescope specialist (d. 2024)
- November 16 — Ivy Ling Po, Hong Kong actress and Chinese opera singer
- Doje Cering, politician of Tibetan ethnicity

=== December ===
- December 17 — Richard Ng, Hong Kong actor (d. 2023)
- December 31 — Li Deren, scientist

== Deaths ==
- January 17 — Qian Xuantong, linguist and writer (b. 1887)
- February 21 — Yu Xiusong, an early member of the Chinese Communist Party (b. 1899)
- May 18 — Tang Juwu, officer and general of one of the Anti-Japanese Volunteer Armies (b. 1898)
- June 5 — Xu Shichang, politician (b. 1855)
- June 12 — Chen Jintao, founder of the Bank of China (b. 1871)
- October 23 — Liao Lei, nationalist general from Guangxi (b. 1890)
- November 4 — Ma Xiangbo, former Jesuit priest, scholar and educator (b. 1840)
- November 12 — Norman Bethune, Canadian thoracic surgeon (b. 1890)
- December 4 — Wu Peifu, warlord and major figure of the Warlord era (b. 1874)

== See also ==
- List of Chinese films of the 1930s
