= 1943 in China =

- Decades: 1920s; 1930s; 1940s; 1950s; 1960s
- See also: Other events of 1943; History of China • Timeline • Years

Events in the year 1943 in China. The country had an estimated population of 444,801,000 in the mainland and 6,507,000 in Taiwan.

== Incumbents ==
- President: Lin Sen (until 1 August), Chiang Kai-shek (from 1 August)
- Premier: Chiang Kai-shek
- Vice Premier: Kung Hsiang-hsi

== Events ==
- Continuing Chinese famine of 1942-43
- January 11 — Conclusion of the Sino-British Treaty for the Relinquishment of Extra-Territorial Rights in China
- January 11 — Signing of the Sino-American Treaty for the Relinquishment of Extraterritorial Rights in China
- May 9–12 — Changjiao massacre
- May 12 – June 3 — Battle of West Hubei
- May 20 — Ratification and entry into force of the Sino-British Treaty for the Relinquishment of Extra-Territorial Rights in China
- May — Ratification and entry into force of the Sino-American Treaty for the Relinquishment of Extraterritorial Rights in China
- Disestablishment of the United States Court for China
- August 18 — Start of the Linnan Campaign
- 2 November - 20 December — Battle of Changde
- Opening of the Sup'ung Dam, in Liaoning

== Births ==
=== March ===
- March 26 — Sanmao, Taiwanese writer and translator (d. 1991)
- Pan Wuyun, linguist

=== May ===
- May 10 — Liu Chao-shiuan, Taiwanese educator and politician

=== June ===
- June 7 — Chan Hung-lit, Hong Kong actor (d. 2009)
- June 22 — Xu Caihou, former Vice Chairman of the Central Military Commission (d. 2015)

=== July ===
- July 1 — Liu Jingnan, geodesist and educator
- July 10 — Michael Chan, Hong Kong actor and martial artist

=== October ===
- October 1 — He Guoqiang, 10th Secretary of the Central Commission for Discipline Inspection
- October 15 — Xi Murong, writer and painter
- October 22 — Zuo Dabin, actress and educator

=== November ===
- November 4 — Mao Peiqi, historian
- November 22 — Xie Shengwu, physicist
- November 25 — Wang Fuchun, photographer and railway worker (d. 2021)

=== December ===
- December 1 — Guo Ruilong, football coach and former player
- December 14 — Fang Chengguo, senior banker (d. 2009)

=== Unknown dates ===
- Abdurehim Haji Amin, politician and accountant (d. 2011)

== Deaths ==
- January 24 — Lü Bicheng, writer, activist, newspaper editor, poet and school founder (b. 1883)
- August 1 — Lin Sen, 3rd Chairman of the Nationalist Government (b. 1868)
- September 9 — Li Shiqun, politician (b. 1905)
- September 20 — Jiang Chaozong, general (b. 1861)
- September 27
  - Mao Zemin, younger brother of Mao Zedong (b. 1896)
  - Chen Tanqiu, politician and founding member of the Chinese Communist Party (b. 1896)
- December 13 — Gong Xinzhan, politician (b. 1871)

=== Dates unknown ===
- Gao Enhong, politician (b. 1875)

== See also ==
- List of Chinese films of the 1940s
