= 1940 in China =

- Decades: 1920s; 1930s; 1940s; 1950s; 1960s
- See also: Other events of 1940; History of China • Timeline • Years

Events in the year 1940 in China.

== Incumbents ==
- President: Lin Sen
- Premier: Chiang Kai-shek
- Vice Premier: H.H. Kung
- Foreign Minister: Wang Ch'ung-hui

== Events ==
- March 16 – April 3 — Battle of Wuyuan
- May 1 – June 18 — Battle of Zaoyang–Yichang
- November 25–30 — Central Hubei Operation

== Births ==
=== January ===
- January 4 — Gao Xingjian, Chinese-French naturalized novelist, playwright, critic, painter, photographer, film director and translator
- January 14 — Li Guanxing, nuclear material engineer (d. 2020)
- January 16 — Pagbalha Geleg Namgyai, 11th Qamdo Pagbalha Hutuktu of Tibetan Buddhism and politician
- January 17
  - Hua Jianmin, former State Councilor of China
  - Anson Chan, Hong Kong politician and civil servant

=== February ===
- February 29 — Lydia Dunn, Hong Kong-born British businesswoman and politician

=== March ===
- March 8 — Jia Qinglin, 7th Chairman of the Chinese People's Political Consultative Conference
- Zhang Fusen, politician

=== April ===
- April 24 — Allen Lee, industrialist, politician and political commentator (d. 2020)
- Jiang Shusheng, physicist and politician

=== June ===
- Liao Xilong, general of the People's Liberation Army

=== August ===
- August 14 — Zhang Lina, physical chemist (d. 2020)
- August 22 — Shi Guangnan, composer (d. 1990)
- Chen Mingyi, 5th Governor of Fujian
- Guo Baochang, director, screenwriter, writer and playwright (d. 2023)

=== October ===
- October 3 — Liu Yongqing, former Spouse of the Paramount Leader of China
- October 8 — Liu Yingming, mathematician (d. 2016)
- October 20 — Li Zhaoxing, 9th Minister of Foreign Affairs of China

=== November ===
- November 27 — Bruce Lee, Hong Kong-American martial artist and actor (d. 1973)

=== December ===
- December 9 — Liang Guanglie, 10th Minister of National Defense of China (d. 2024)
- December 17 — Lü Zhong, actress
- December 18 — Lei Feng, soldier of the People's Liberation Army (d. 1962)
- December 22 — Bai Yilong, mechanist (d. 2024)
- Huang Hengmei, lieutenant general of the People's Liberation Army

=== Date unknown ===
- Yu Lina, violinist pedagogue
- Patsy Toh, British pianist

== Deaths ==
- February 23 — Yang Jingyu, Communist military commander and political commissar (b. 1905)
- March 4 — Gao Lingwei, politician (b. 1870)
- March 5 — Cai Yuanpei, philosopher and politician (b. 1868)
- April 5 — Song Zheyuan, general (b. 1885)
- May 14 — Luo Zhenyu, classical scholar, philologist, epigrapher, antiquarian and Qing loyalist (b. 1866)
- May 16 — Zhang Zizhong, general (b. 1891)
- August 1 — Ma Junwu, scientist and educator (b. 1881)
- September 26 — Xu Qian, politician and jurist (b. 1871)
- December 1 — Shi Yousan, 9th Governor of Chahar (b. 1891)
- December 31 — Xiao Youmei, music educator and composer (b. 1884)

== See also ==
- List of Chinese films of the 1940s
