= 1944 in China =

- Decades: 1920s; 1930s; 1940s; 1950s; 1960s
- See also: Other events of 1944; History of China • Timeline • Years

Events in the year 1944 in China.

== Incumbents ==
- President: Chiang Kai-shek
- Premier: Chiang Kai-shek
- Vice Premier: Kung Hsiang-hsi

== Events ==
- April 17 – May 25 — Battle of Central Henan
- May – August — Battle of Changsha (1944)
- June 22 – August 8 — Defense of Hengyang
- August 16 – November 24 — Battle of Guilin–Liuzhou

== Births ==
=== January ===
- January 13 — Lau Dan, Hong Kong actor
- January 16 — Xu Genbao, football manager and international football player

=== February ===
- February 1 — Li Changchun, member of the 16th & 17th Politburo Standing Committee of the Chinese Communist Party
- February 19 — Chen Zude, professional Go player (d. 2012)
- February 29 — Karl Maka, Hong Kong film producer, director, actor and presenter

=== March ===
- Sun Jiazheng, politician

=== April ===
- April 16 — Deng Pufang, politician and son of Deng Xiaoping
- April 29 — Liu Chuanzhi, entrepreneur

=== May ===
- May 20 — Qi Wusheng, football coach and former international player

=== June ===
- June 2 — Gua Ah-leh, Taiwanese actress and singer

=== July ===
- July 24 — Joe Cheung, Hong Kong director, producer, scriptwriter and actor
- Liu Zemin, politician (d. 2017)

=== October ===
- October 1 — Dai Xianglong, 10th Governor of the People's Bank of China
- October 7 — Donald Tsang, 2nd Chief Executive of Hong Kong
- October 25 — Ren Zhengfei, founder and CEO of Huawei Technologies
- October 28 — Ma Junren, track coach
- Hui Liangyu, former Vice Premier of China
- Huang Qingyi, politician
- Zhang Wenyue, 12th Secretary of the Liaoning Provincial Committee of the Chinese Communist Party
- Legqog, 6th Chairman of Tibet Autonomous Region
- Chu Bo, 10th Secretary of the Inner Mongolia Autonomous Regional Committee of the Chinese Communist Party

=== November ===
- November 10 — Li Guyi, singer and dancer
- November 18 — Wang Enduo, biochemist and molecular biologist
- Xu Guangchun, 13th Secretary of the Henan Provincial Committee of the Chinese Communist Party (d. 2022)
- Ismail Tiliwaldi, 9th Chairman of the Xinjiang Uyghur Autonomous Region

=== December ===
- December 10 — Zheng Xiaoyu, former director of the State Food and Drug Administration (d. 2007)
- December 21 — Wang Lequan, 8th Secretary of the Xinjiang Uyghur Autonomous Regional Committee of the Chinese Communist Party
- Zheng Chengsi, intellectual property expert (d. 2006)

== Deaths ==
- March 8 — Xu Zonghan, hero of the Xinhai Revolution (b. 1876)
- May 20 — Eugene Chen, former Minister of Foreign Affairs of the Republic of China (b. 1878)
- May 21 — Li Jiayu, nationalist general (b. 1892)
- June 11 — Teng Yu-hsien, Taiwanese Hakka musician (b. 1906)
- July 24 — Zou Taofen, journalist, media entrepreneur and political activist (b. 1895)
- September 5 — Zhang Side, communist soldier and guard of Mao Zedong (b. 1915)
- September 11 — Peng Xuefeng, New Fourth Army general officer (b. 1907)
- November 10 — Wang Jingwei, 24th Premier of the Republic of China (b. 1883)
- December 26 — Zhu Shenghao, translator (b. 1912)

=== Unknown dates ===
- Men Bingyue, general of the National Revolutionary Army (b. 1890)
- Lin Zongsu, suffragist and writer (b. 1878)
