= 1942 in China =

- Decades: 1920s; 1930s; 1940s; 1950s; 1960s
- See also: Other events of 1942; History of China • Timeline • Years

Events in the year 1942 in China.

== Incumbents ==
- President: Lin Sen
- Premier: Chiang Kai-shek
- Vice Premier: Kung Hsiang-hsi

== Events ==
- Beginning of the Chinese famine of 1942-43
- April 26 - a gas and coal dust explosion in the Benxihu Colliery killed 1,549 miners.
- mid May-early September - Zhejiang-Jiangxi Campaign
- A cholera epidemic in Yunnan province kills around 200 people

== Births ==
=== January ===
- January 16 — Zhao Zhongxiang, news anchor (d. 2020)

=== February ===
- Huang Zhiquan, former Governor of Jiangxi Province

=== March ===
- March 10 — Li Zhilun, 6th Minister of Supervision of China (d. 2007)
- Ablet Abdureshit, 8th Chairman of the Xinjiang Uyghur Autonomous Region

=== April ===
- April 28 — Lu Yongxiang, mechanical engineer and politician
- April 30 — James Soong, Taiwanese politician

=== July ===
- July 6 — Wang Zhizhen, biophysicist
- July 13 — Yueh Hua, Hong Kong actor (d. 2018)
- Guo Boxiong, former general of the People's Liberation Army
- Huang Baosheng, scholar of Sanskrit and Pali (d. 2023)

=== September ===
- September 3 — Michael Hui, Hong Kong actor and comedian
- September 15 — Wen Jiabao, 6th Premier of China
- September 22 — Wu Ma, Hong Kong actor, director, producer and writer (d. 2014)

=== October ===
- October 5
  - He Xiangjian, co-founder of Midea
  - Wang Gang, politician

=== November ===
- November 3 — Liu Qi, 11th Secretary of the Beijing Municipal Committee of the Chinese Communist Party
- November 21 — Chen Zhili, politician
- Chen Guidi, writer

=== December ===
- December 3 — Zhou Yongkang, member of the 17th Politburo Standing Committee of the Chinese Communist Party
- December 21 — Hu Jintao, 5th Paramount Leader of China
- December 28 — Uyunqimg, 8th Chairwoman of the Inner Mongolia Autonomous Region (d. 2024)

=== Unknown dates ===
- Chen Jialin, film director (d. 2022)

== Deaths ==
- January 22 — Xiao Hong, writer (b. 1911)
- February 12 — Zhao Shangzhi, military commander (b. 1908)
- May 25 — Zuo Quan, senior staff officer in the Eighth Route Army (b. 1905)
- May 26 — Dai Anlan, commander of the 200th Division of the National Revolutionary Army (b. 1904)
- May 27 — Chen Duxiu, 1st General Secretary of the Chinese Communist Party (b. 1879)
- August 14 — Tan Yuling, concubine of China's last emperor Puyi (b. 1920)
- October 13 — Hong Yi, monk, artist and musician (b. 1880)
- December 9 — Dwarkanath Kotnis, Indian physician regarded as an example for Sino-Indian friendship and collaboration (b. 1910)

== See also ==
- List of Chinese films of the 1940s
