= Hebei F.C. =

Chinese professional football club

Hebei F.C. 河北足球俱乐部
- Full name: Hebei Football Club
- Founded: 2009; 17 years ago
- Dissolved: 29 March 2023; 3 years ago
- Ground: Langfang Stadium
- Capacity: 30,040
- Website: english.hebeifootball.com
Home colours	Away colours

Hebei Football Club (simplified Chinese: 河北足球俱乐部; traditional Chinese: 河北足球俱樂部; pinyin: Héběi Zúqiú Jùlèbù) was a professional Chinese football club that participated in the Chinese Super League division under licence from the Chinese Football Association (CFA). The team was based in Langfang, Hebei. The club was dissolved in March 2023.

According to Forbes, Hebei was the 7th most valuable football team in China, with a team value of $90 million, and an estimated revenue of $22 million in 2015.

== History ==
Hebei Zhongji was founded on 28 May 2010 by the Hebei football association and Hebei Zhongji Group who promised to invest three million Yuan a season for next four campaigns. They registered to play within China League Two, third tier of the Chinese football league system, as Hebei Yilin Shanzhuang (Simplified Chinese: 河北依林山庄) for sponsorship reasons in the 2011 league season. They failed to advance into the Play-offs after finishing in 5th place in the group stage. On 17 October 2011, the cooperation relationship between Hebei FA and Hebei Zhongji Group was terminated and Hebei Zhongji Group took full ownership of the club while the players who were owned by Hebei FA split into a new team called Hebei Youth. In the 2012 league season, Hebei Zhongji finished in 1st place in the North Group with 18 wins, 5 draws and only 1 defeat, however they were knocked out in the quarter-finals of the Play-offs by Hubei China-Kyle with the score at 1–1, losing on the away goals rule. On 16 August 2013 Guo Ruilong was brought in to manage the team for the rest of the 2013 league season, however during his brief tenure at the club he quickly led them to promotion after finishing runners-up at the end of the campaign. Huang Yang was brought in to coach the team during the off season while on December 26, 2013, the club announced that Uruguayan Nelson Agresta would be the club's first foreign manager.

On 27 January 2015, they changed the team name to Hebei China Fortune (Simplified Chinese: 河北华夏幸福) after being purchased by China Fortune Land Development. Serbian manager Radomir Antić signed a three-year contract with the club on the same day. They changed the club name to Hebei China Fortune F.C. in December 2015 after winning promotion to Chinese Super League in the 2015 season. The club has since expanded its bid for league success by landing international stars such as Gervinho and Ezequiel Lavezzi. In August 2016, the Chilean Manuel Pellegrini became manager of the club, as part of a larger plan for Hebei China Fortune F.C. and Chinese football to make a great leap forward by the end of the decade. This process continued with the appointment of Chris Coleman on 10 June 2018.

== Ownership and naming history ==
Year	Owner	Club name	Sponsored team name
2011	Hebei Zhongji Group	Hebei Zhongji Football Club	Hebei Yilinshanzhuang
2012–2014	Hebei Zhongji Group	Hebei Zhongji Football Club	
2015	China Fortune Land Development	Hebei Zhongji Football Club	Hebei China Fortune
2016–2020	China Fortune Land Development	Hebei China Fortune Football Club	Hebei China Fortune
2021–2022	China Fortune Land Development	Hebei Football Club	Hebei Football Club

=== Managerial history ===
Nationality	Manager	Duration		Departure reason
Nationality	Manager	Start	Finish	Departure reason
(China)	Wei Yuanhao	May 28, 2010	October 13, 2011	Mutual consent
(China)	Zhang Yandong	October 14, 2011	August 15, 2013	Mutual consent
(China)	Guo Ruilong	August 16, 2013	December 3, 2013	Mutual consent
(China)	Huang Yang	December 4, 2013	December 25, 2013	Mutual consent
(Uruguay)	Nelson Agresta	December 26, 2013	August 14, 2014	Sacked
(Uruguay)	Alejandro Larrea	August 14, 2014	December 31, 2014	Mutual consent
(Serbia)	Radomir Antić	January 27, 2015	August 18, 2015	Mutual consent
(China)	Li Tie	August 18, 2015	August 27, 2016	Sacked
(Chile)	Manuel Pellegrini	August 27, 2016	May 19, 2018	Mutual consent
(Wales)	Chris Coleman	June 10, 2018	May 15, 2019	Sacked
(China)	Xie Feng	May 15, 2019	March 28, 2021	Mutual consent
(South Korea)	Kim Jong-boo	March 28, 2021	December 16, 2022	Mutual consent

== Results ==
All-time league rankings

As of the end of 2022 season.

Year	Div	Pld	W	D	L	GF	GA	GD	Pts	Pos.	FA Cup	Super Cup	AFC	Att./G	Stadium
2011	3	14	4	4	6	14	16	−2	16	5 ^{1}	DNE	DNQ	DNQ		Yutong International Sports Center
2012	3	26	18	7	1	50	11	39	59 ^{1}	6	R2	DNQ	DNQ	4,783	Yutong International Sports Center
2013	3	19	11	4	4	40	13	27	27 ^{1}	RU	R2	DNQ	DNQ		Yutong International Sports Center
2014	2	30	6	11	13	31	54	−23	29	14	R2	DNQ	DNQ	6,239	Yutong International Sports Center
2015	2	30	18	6	6	53	30	23	60	RU	R4	DNQ	DNQ	7,796	Qinhuangdao Olympic Sports Center Stadium
2016	1	30	11	7	12	34	38	−4	40	7	QF	DNQ	DNQ	18,469	Qinhuangdao Olympic Sports Center Stadium
2017	1	30	15	7	8	55	38	17	52	4	R4	DNQ	DNQ	18,054	Qinhuangdao Olympic Sports Center Stadium
2018	1	30	10	9	11	46	50	−4	39	6	R16	DNQ	DNQ	16,029	Langfang Stadium
2019	1	30	9	6	15	37	55	-18	33	11	R4	DNQ	DNQ	17,799	Langfang Stadium
2020	1	20	7	4	9	32	44	-12	25	8	R1	DNQ	DNQ		
2021	1	22	6	7	9	15	28	-13	25	8	R4	DNQ	DNQ		
2022	1	34	2	0	32	18	115	-97	-3^{2}	18	R2	DNQ	DNQ		

- ^1 In group stage.
- ^2 Hebei had 3 points deducted due to unpaid salaries on 5 November 2022 and had 6 points deducted due to unpaid salaries on 23 November 2022.

Key

	China top division
	China second division
	China third division
W	Winners
RU	Runners-up
3	Third place
	Relegated

- Pld = Played
- W = Games won
- D = Games drawn
- L = Games lost
- F = Goals for
- A = Goals against
- Pts = Points
- Pos = Final position
- DNQ = Did not qualify
- DNE = Did not enter
- NH = Not held
- – = Does not exist
- R1 = Round 1
- R2 = Round 2
- R3 = Round 3
- R4 = Round 4
- F = Final
- SF = Semi-finals
- QF = Quarter-finals
- R16 = Round of 16
- Group = Group stage
- GS2 = Second Group stage
- QR1 = First Qualifying Round
- QR2 = Second Qualifying Round
- QR3 = Third Qualifying Round
