= Wang Chongyou =

Chinese geologist

- 王宠佑
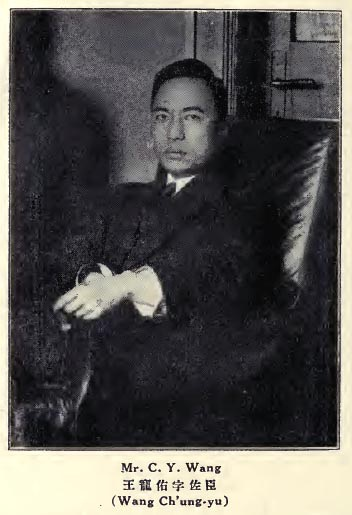
- Born: 29 December 1879
- Died: 31 August 1958 (aged 78); New York City, U.S.
- Other name: Wang Zuochen (王佐臣)
- Education: Peiyang University (BS); University of California, Berkeley; Columbia University (BS, BS); Royal School of Mines
- Occupations: Mining and metallurgical engineer

Chinese name
- Traditional Chinese: 王寵佑
- Simplified Chinese: 王宠佑
Transcriptions
Standard Mandarin
- Hanyu Pinyin: wáng chǒng yòu
- Wade–Giles: wang ch'ung yu

Wang Chongyou (simplified Chinese: 王宠佑; traditional Chinese: 王寵佑, 29 December 1879 – 31 August 1958), or Wang Chung-yu, was a Chinese geologist and metallurgist. He established China's first antimony refinery, and was a founding member of the Geological Society of China.

== Early life and education ==
Wang was born in Hong Kong on 29 December 1879. He attended Queen's College in 1893 and studied for two years before enrolling in Peiyang University with his younger brother Wang Chonghui. He studied in the School of Mining and Metallurgy and graduated in 1899.

In 1901, Wang was selected as one of the Chinese students to study abroad in the United States. He first studied mining engineering at University of California, Berkeley. Around late 1903, he transferred to Columbia University in New York City, where he earned the bachelor's degrees in mining and geology in 1904. From 1906 to 1908, he traveled to Europe and studied the United Kingdom, France and Germany. While at the Royal School of Mines, he became acquainted with Liang Huanyi, whose family operated a metal-smelting business in Changsha, Hunan.

== Career ==
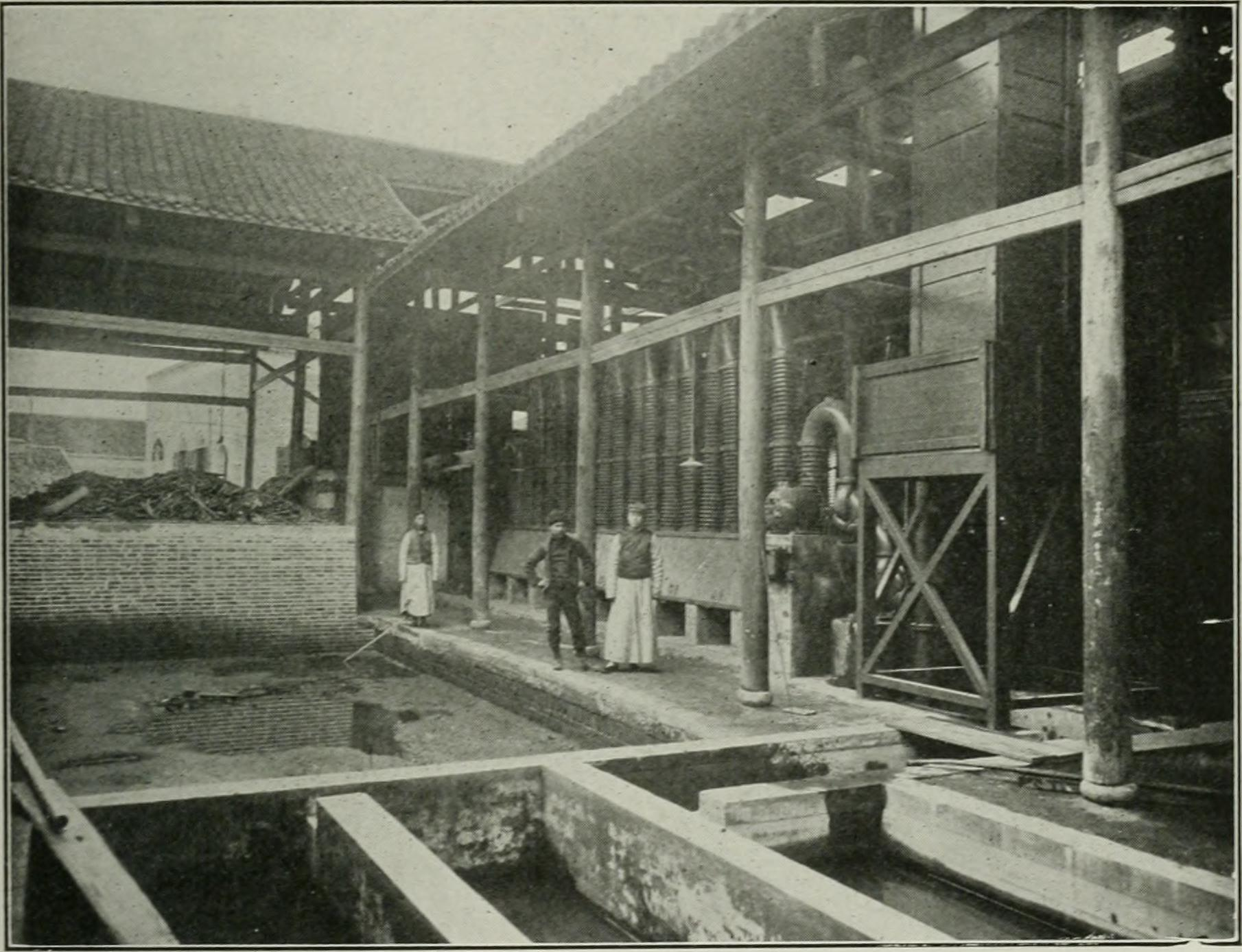
The first Herrenschmidt shaft furnace installed in Changsha, 1908

In 1908, Wang and Liang Dingfu traveled to France to acquire a patent for the Herrenschmidt process, a new technique for smelting antimony trisulfide ore. Once back in Changsha, Wang joined the newly founded Wah Chang Mining & Smelting Company (Chinese: 华昌炼矿公司) owned by the Liang family. They subsequently established China's first antimony smelting facility, the Changsha Wah Chang Antimony Refinery, where Wang served as the metallurgical expert and chief engineer.

In 1908, Wang was appointed as the Commissioner of Commerce and Industry in Guangzhou. In 1909, he published his book "Antimony" in the United Kingdom, which was the world's first monograph on antimony.

Between 1914 and 1922, Wang held various positions in mines, refineries and government agencies across China. In 1922, he became one of the 26 founding members of the Geological Society of China, and served as a consultant to the Chinese delegation at the Washington Naval Conference. In 1929, he received the University Medal from Columbia University.

In 1933, Wang became a member of the National Resources Commission. In 1934, he was invited to investigate the tin mines in Hunan and antimony mines and antimony smelters in several other locations. Between 1938 and 1939, he was sent by the Resources Committee to survey the antimony and tin industries in Europe and America. From 1939 to 1940, he served as the chairman of the Preparatory Committee for the establishment of iron and steel plants in Yunnan.

== Later years ==
In 1941, Wang traveled to the United States, where he served as the director of the research office at Wah Chang Company. In 1947, he introduced a team of American experts to visit China and investigate the antimony mines in Lengshuijiang, Hunan, and the tin mines in Gejiu, Yunnan.

On 31 August 1958, Wang died at the Columbia-Presbyterian Medical Center, New York.

== Selected works ==
- Wang Chung-yu. Antimony. 1st ed. London：Charles Griffin & co, Ltd.1909；2nd ed. 1919; 3rd ed. 1952.
- Wang Chung-yu. "The Practice of Antimony Smelting in China". Trans. AIME, 1919, 9：3.
- Wang Chung-yu. "The Relation of Tectonics to Ore Deposits". Bull.Geol.Soc.China, 1924, 3(2)：169-181.
- Wang Chung-yu. "The Relation of Oceanic Deeps and Geosynclines to Ore Deposits". Acta Geologica Sinica, 1926, 5(1): 25-36.
- Li K.L., Wang Chung-yu. Tungsten. 1st ed.New York：Reinhold Publishing Co.,1943；2nd ed. 1947；3rd ed. 1955.
