= 2004 in Hong Kong =

- Decades: 1980s; 1990s; 2000s; 2010s; 2020s
- See also: Other events of 2004; History of Hong Kong • Timeline • Years

Events in the year 2004 in Hong Kong.

== Incumbents ==
- Chief Executive: Tung Chee-hwa

== Events ==
=== April ===
- 2 April – Playhouse Disney (Hong Kong TV channel) is launched.

=== August ===
- 13 to 29 August – Hong Kong at the 2004 Summer Olympics

=== September ===
- 12 September - 2004 Hong Kong legislative election
- 17 to 28 September - Hong Kong at the 2004 Summer Paralympics

=== October ===
- October - MC Jin, American son of Hong Kong immigrants, a rapper, songwriter, actor and comedian, releases his debut album, The Rest Is History.

=== December ===
- 21 December - Ma On Shan rail line is opened.

=== Full date unknown ===
- Kelly Chen, Hong Kong female celebrity is awarded "The Outstanding Young Persons of the World" by the Junior Chamber International.

== Deaths ==
=== May ===
- 1 May - Wong Ker-lee, 93, Fujianese Hong Kong businessman and politician. (b. 1910)

=== June ===
- 11 June - Joyce Symons, 85, Hong Kong educator. (b. 1918)

=== July ===
- 16 July - John Park, 80, Hong Kong sailor (b. 1924)

=== November ===
- 24 November - James Wong, 64, Hong Kong lyricist, actor, director, talk show host and author (b. 1941)

== See also ==
- List of Hong Kong films of 2004
