= COVID-19 pandemic in Fujian =

- Disease: COVID-19
- Pathogen: SARS-CoV-2
- Location: Fujian, China
- First outbreak: Wuhan, Hubei
- Arrival date: January 22, 2020
- Confirmed cases: 12,191
- Active cases: 23
- Recovered: 1,533
- Deaths: 1

The COVID-19 pandemic reached the province of Fujian, China, on January 22, 2020.

== Statistics ==
Division	Active	Confirmed	Deceased	Recovered
Fujian	23	12,191	1	1,533
Xiamen	10	1,000	0	277
Putian	0	261	0	261
Quanzhou	154	1,000	0	71
Fuzhou	0	500	1	71
Ningde	1	100	0	26
Zhangzhou	0	100	0	23
Nanping	0	100	0	20
Sanming	1	100	0	14
Longyan	0	100	0	6
Overseas import personnel	23	833	0	764
As of 24:00 on March 16, 2022 (confirmed case data includes cured cases and dead cases).)

== Timeline ==
=== 2020 ===
On January 22, 2020, the National Health Commission confirmed the first confirmed case of imported novel coronavirus pneumonia in Fujian Province.

On January 25, Fujian Province reported 8 new confirmed cases of pneumonia imported from the new coronavirus infection, including 1 in Fuzhou, 3 in Zhangzhou, 2 in Quanzhou, 1 in Sanming, and 1 in Ningde. As of January 25, Fujian Province had reported a total of 18 confirmed cases of imported novel coronavirus pneumonia.

On January 27, Fujian Province reported 21 newly confirmed cases of pneumonia imported from the new coronavirus infection, including 4 cases in Fuzhou City, 5 cases in Quanzhou City, 8 cases in Putian City, 1 case in Nanping City, and 3 cases in Ningde City.

On January 28, Fujian Province reported 14 new confirmed cases, all of which were imported cases, including 1 in Xiamen, 3 in Quanzhou, 4 in Sanming, 4 in Putian, 1 in Nanping, and 1 in Longyan.

On January 29, Fujian Province reported 2 new confirmed cases, all of which were imported cases, including 1 in Zhangzhou City (1 in Zhao'an County), and 1 in Sanming City (1 in Youxi County).

On January 30, Fujian Province reported 17 new confirmed cases, all of which were imported cases, including 6 cases in Fuzhou City (2 cases in Jin'an District, 2 cases in Minqing County, 1 case in Lianjiang County, and 1 case in Minhou County) ), 1 case in Xiamen City (1 case in Wuhan City, Hubei Province), 5 cases in Quanzhou City (2 cases in Nan'an City, 1 case in Fengze District, 1 case in Anxi County, 1 case in Shishi City), 1 case in Sanming City (1 case in Sha County ), 3 cases in Putian City (1 case in Chengxiang District, 1 case in Xiuyu District, 1 case in Wuhan City, Hubei Province), 1 case in Ningde City (1 case in Fuding City).

In March 2020, Xinjia Express Hotel, which was being used to quarantine COVID-19 patients, collapsed, causing 29 deaths.

=== 2021 ===
In September 2021, the government of Putian imposed restrictions on travel and activity in response to what CCTV described on 13 September as a "serious and complex" outbreak. A total of 43 locally transmitted cases were reported in Fujian from 10 to 12 September, of which 35 were in Putian and which included cases of the Delta variant. In addition, 32 asymptomatic cases (which are reported separately in China) were detected in Fujian (all in Putian) over the same period.

According to state media at the time, the Putian outbreak was suspected to have started with a traveler who had arrived in Xianyou County from Singapore via Xiamen.

=== 2022 ===
On January 1, Fujian Province reported 9 newly imported confirmed cases (all were reported by Xiamen City).

On January 2, Fujian Province reported 2 newly imported confirmed cases (both reported by Xiamen City).

On January 3, Fujian Province reported 9 newly imported confirmed cases (all were reported by Xiamen City).
