= Northeast National Salvation Society =

Northeastern People's Counter-Japanese National Salvation Society
- Simplified Chinese: 东北民众抗日救国会
- Traditional Chinese: 東北民眾抗日救國會
Transcriptions
Standard Mandarin
- Hanyu Pinyin: Dōngběi Mínzhòng Kàngrì Jiùguóhuì

The Northeast National Salvation Society was an organization formed by exiles from Manchuria, (the Northeast) in order to put pressure on the Chinese government of Chiang Kai-shek to end its policy of non resistance to the Empire of Japan that had invaded Manchuria after the Mukden Incident and to assist the volunteer armies, especially the Northeast People's Anti-Japanese Volunteer Army in Liaoning, led by Tang Juwu. One of its chief supporters was Zhang Xueliang who privately supported this resistance, despite his public obedience to the government policy of non resistance. Zhang was not publicly associated with the Society and never held office in it, but provided funds and allowed it to use his name when communicating with volunteer armies.

The society was dissolved in 1933, under pressure from Chinese government in Nanjing.
