= 2005 in Hong Kong =

- Decades: 1980s; 1990s; 2000s; 2010s; 2020s
- See also: Other events of 2005; History of Hong Kong • Timeline • Years

Events in the year 2005 in Hong Kong.

== Incumbents ==
- Chief Executive: Tung Chee-hwa (until 12 March); Donald Tsang (from 21 June)

== Events ==
=== September ===
- 12 September – Hong Kong Disneyland opened to visitors at 13:00 (HKT).

== See also ==
- List of Hong Kong films of 2005
