= Northeast People's Anti-Japanese Volunteer Army =

The Northeast People's Anti-Japanese Volunteer Army was led by Tang Juwu, formerly the commander of a Northeastern infantry regiment, interned by the Japanese at the beginning of the invasion of Manchuria. It was created by the Northeast National Salvation Society that had appointed Tang as commander following his escape from the Japanese, and helped him link with the local forces which others were organising. Tang also made use of his personal contacts with police chiefs, officials, local gentry militias and the leaders of the Big Swords Society. Tang was able to organize a force which threatened the region to the east of Mukden and communications with Korea.

In May 1932, Tang Juwu ordered his 20,000-man army to go on the offensive, besieging Tonghua. The Japanese were unable to defeat Tang, and his force threatened the region to the east of the important city of Mukden and communications with Korea. Based in the Tonghua area, his army fought with the Japanese Kwantung Army stationed in Shenyang and the Manchukuon army of South Liaoning province. Although all major cities had been lost, the volunteer armies gained a new lease of life during the summer of 1932 and reached their greatest strength.

On October 11, 1932, two Japanese cavalry brigades, one mixed brigade, and seven Manchukuo puppet brigades attacked Tang Juwu's forces in Tonghua and Huanren area. The threat of Japanese aerial bombardment of Tonghua forced Tang to withdraw from it in order to spare the civilian population. After the defection of the Manchukuoan 37th Route commander Wang Yongcheng, Tang Juwu was able to break through the Japanese encirclement to the west and escape. On October 16 the Japanese took over Tonghua, and on the 17th, Hengren, with casualties of 500 men. Tang and the remainder of his force eventually were forced to flee into Rehe.

== See also ==
- Japanese invasion of Manchuria
- Pacification of Manchukuo
- Second Sino-Japanese War
