= Zou Deci =

Chinese engineer (1934–2020)

- Born: October 1, 1934; Shanghai, China
- Died: December 28, 2020 (aged 86); Beijing, China
- Education: Tongji University
- Scientific career
- Fields: City planning
- Workplaces: China Academy of Urban Planning & Design

Chinese name
- Traditional Chinese: 鄒德慈
- Simplified Chinese: 邹德慈
Transcriptions
Standard Mandarin
- Hanyu Pinyin: Zōu Décí

Zou Deci (Chinese: 邹德慈; 1 October 1934 – 28 December 2020) was a Chinese engineer in the fields of city planning. He was a member of the Urban Planning Society of China (UPSC) and the Chinese Communist Party (CPC).

== Biography ==
Zou was born in Shanghai, on October 1, 1934, while his ancestral home was in Yujiang District of Yingtan, Jiangxi. In September 1951, he was accepted by Tongji University, majoring in city planning.

After graduating in July 1955, he was assigned to a designing institute of the Urban Construction Ministry as a technician. He worked at the Urban Planning Research Institute of State Planning Commission from January 1961 to February 1964, Urban Planning Bureau of State Economic Commission from February 1964 to March 1965, and State Construction Commission from March 1965 to December 1973. In January 1974, he was promoted to become chief engineer of the CCCC First Harbour Consultants Company Co. Ltd., a position he held until June 1980. In June 1980, he moved to the Institute of Urban Planning, State Administration of Urban Construction as chief engineer. After the institutional reform as China Academy of Urban Planning & Design, he served as vice-president in January 1982 and president in January 1986.

On December 28, 2020, he died of illness in Beijing, at the age of 86.

== Honours and awards ==
- 2003 Member of the Chinese Academy of Engineering (CAE)
