= Guo Ruilong =

Chinese footballer and coach

Guo Ruilong 郭瑞龙
Personal information
- Date of birth: 1 December 1943 (age 82)
- Place of birth: Kunming, Yunnan, China
- Position: Midfielder

Youth career
- 1960–1963: Beijing Youth
- 1964: Beijing Workers

Senior career*
Years	Team	Apps	(Gls)
1965–1975	Beijing Team		

Managerial career
- 1976: Inner Mongolia
- 1977–1985: Beijing Youth
- 1986: China U17
- 1988–1989: China U-20
- 2000–2001: Chengdu Wuniu
- 2005: Shenzhen Jianlibao (caretaker)
- 2005: Shenzhen Jianlibao (caretaker)
- 2008: Anhui Jiufang
- 2008: Wenzhou Tomorrow
- 2013: Hebei Zhongji
- * Club domestic league appearances and goals

Guo Ruilong (simplified Chinese: 郭瑞龙; traditional Chinese: 郭瑞龍; pinyin: Guō Ruìlóng; Born 1 December 1943) is a Chinese football coach and former player.

== Playing career ==
Born in Kunming, Guo returned to his hometown Beijing in 1946 after the Second Sino-Japanese War ended. He began his football career for Beijing Team's youth team and later graduated to the senior team in 1965. He became a football coach after his retirement in 1975.

== Managerial career ==
Guo served for Inner Mongolia, Beijing Youth and China national youth between 1976 and 1989. In 1990, Guo was appointed as the assistant coach of Beijing Team. On 9 May 2000, Guo joined Chinese Jia-B League club Chengdu Wuniu who struggled in the bottom of league, and helped the club stay in the second tier for the next season. He was sacked by Chengdu on 16 September 2001. He became the assistant coach of top-tier club Shenzhen Ping'an in December 2001. He was appointed as the team's manager on 17 May 2005 after Chi Shangbin's dismissal. Despite severe financial problems, Guo led Shenzhen to reach the 2005 AFC Champions League semi-finals before heavily defeated by UAE champions Al Ain 6–0. He was suddenly sacked on 14 October 2005.

Guo returned to football in December 2007 when he accepted the invitation of China League One club Anhui Jiufang. On 15 April 2008, he resigned from the team due to "health problems". He joined China League Two club Wenzhou Tomorrow in June 2008. Guo became the manager of League Two club Hebei Zhongji on 16 August 2013. Although Hebei Zhongji won promotion in the 2013 season by finishing the runners-up in League Two, he didn't extent his contract and left the club.

== Honours ==
=== Player ===
Beijing Team

- China national league: 1983
