= 2006 in Hong Kong =

- Decades: 1980s; 1990s; 2000s; 2010s; 2020s
- See also: Other events of 2006; History of Hong Kong • Timeline • Years

Events in the year 2006 in Hong Kong.

== Incumbents ==
- Chief Executive: Donald Tsang

== Events ==
- 17 March - Police shootout at the Tsim Sha Tsui station leads to the death of police officer and serial killer Tsui Po-ko
- 27 April - the Bus Uncle viral video is filmed

== See also ==
- List of Hong Kong films of 2006
