= Wan Huilin =

Chinese physical chemist (1938–2024)

- 万惠霖
- Born: 20 November 1938; Hankou, Hubei, China
- Died: 28 April 2024 (aged 85); Xiamen, Fujian, China
- Education: Xiamen University
- Scientific career
- Fields: Physical chemistry
- Workplaces: Xiamen University
- Doctoral advisor: Cai Qirui

Chinese name
- Simplified Chinese: 万惠霖
- Traditional Chinese: 萬惠霖
Transcriptions
Standard Mandarin
- Hanyu Pinyin: Wàn Huìlín

Wan Huilin (Chinese: 万惠霖; 20 November 1938 – 28 April 2024) was a Chinese physical chemist who was a professor at Xiamen University, and an academician of the Chinese Academy of Sciences. He was a member of the Chinese Communist Party (CCP).

== Biography ==
Wan was born in Hankou, Hubei, on 20 November 1938. He attended the First Affiliated Middle School of Central China Normal University. In 1958, he enrolled at the Central South University of Mining and Metallurgy (now Central South University), where he majored in the Metallurgical Department. In 1959, due to the adjustment of university and colleges departments, he was transferred to the Department of Chemistry, Xiamen University.

After graduating in 1962, Wan stayed for teaching. In 1982, he became a visiting scholar at the Department of Chemistry, Massachusetts Institute of Technology.

On 28 April 2024, he died in Xiamen, Fujian, at the age of 85.

== Honours and awards ==
- 1986 State Natural Science Award (Third Class) for the research on nitrogen fixation to ammonia under the action of nitrogenase and iron catalyst.
- 1997 Member of the Chinese Academy of Sciences (CAS)
- 2001 National Labor Medal
