= Meng Zhizhong =

Chinese satellite engineer (1934–2019)

- Born: December 16, 1934; Hangzhou, Zhejiang, China
- Died: December 14, 2019 (aged 84); Shanghai, China
- Education: South China University of Technology
- Scientific career
- Fields: Weather satellite
- Workplaces: Shanghai Academy of Spaceflight Technology

Chinese name
- Simplified Chinese: 孟执中
- Traditional Chinese: 孟執中
Transcriptions
Standard Mandarin
- Hanyu Pinyin: Mèng Zhízhōng

Meng Zhizhong (Chinese: 孟执中; 16 December 1934 – 14 December 2019) was a Chinese satellite engineer at the Shanghai Academy of Spaceflight Technology. He was the chief designer of the Fengyun-1, China's first meteorological satellite, as well as the Fengyun-3.

== Biography ==
Meng was born in Hangzhou (some documents record that he was born in Zhuji), on December 16, 1934. In 1956 he graduated from South China University of Technology. In 1958 he was sent to study at the Institute of Automatic and Remote Control, Russian Academy of Sciences at the expense of the government.

From 1960 to 1968, he worked as assistant researcher in Institute of Automation, Chinese Academy of Sciences (CAS). In 1968 he became director of Computer System Department at the Satellite Telemetry and Telecontrol Base, but having held the position for only one year. In 1970, he was appointed deputy director and chief engineer of Shanghai Huayin Machine Factory, which is a satellite assembling factory. He was director of 509 Institute of the Fifth Academy of the Ministry of Astronautics Industry of the People's Republic of China in 1982, and held that office until 1993. He became deputy director of Science & Technology Committee of Shanghai Academy of Space flight Technology (SAST) in 1993.

He died of an illness in Shanghai, on December 14, 2019, aged 84.

== Contributions ==
Meng contributed to the design of the computer system for "Dong Fang Hong I" satellite's ground telemetry and telecontrol center and network. He was responsible for developing the CK-1 Technical Experiment Satellite, which had been successfully launched three times. He was the chief engineer of the FY-1 and FY-3, China's first weather satellites. The successful launch of the satellites FY-1A and FY-1B made China the third country to successfully develop a Sun-synchronous orbit meteorological satellite. He successfully developed the fully digital 3-axis-stabilized attitude control system and the folded solar array, a first in China. He contributed to the innovation of remote sensing technology, i.e. the number of detecting channels is raised to 10, which reaches the advance level in the world. He successfully developed the satellite-carried computer with the capability of self-trouble-diagnosis and the capability of system reorganization.

== Honours and awards ==
- 1997 Foreign Academician of the Russian Academy of Navigation
- 2002 Science and Technology Award of the Ho Leung Ho Lee Foundation
- 2003 Member of the Chinese Academy of Engineering (CAE)
- 2021 Asian Scientist 100, Asian Scientist
