= Yan Chongnian =

Chinese historian

Yan Chongnian 阎崇年
- Born: April 1934 (age 92); Penglai, Shandong
- Citizenship: China
- Education: Beijing Normal University
- Scientific career
- Fields: Qing history

Yan Chongnian is a Chinese historian. He was born in Penglai City, Shandong, China in 1934. He established Beijing Manchu Institute, the first academic institute focused on the Manchu history.

== Writing ==
Yan's academic work focuses on Manchu history. His publications include Biography of Yuan Chonghuan (ISBN 7-101-04869-2), True Stories of the 12 Qing Emperors (正説清朝十二帝, ISBN 7-101-04445-X), Fall of Ming and Rise of Qing in 60 Years (明亡清興六十年, ISBN 7-101-05267-3) and The City of Intellectuals— Beijing Through the Centuries (First ed.). China Democracy and Legal System Publishing House. 2008. ISBN 978-7-80219-385-7. OCLC 880101674.

== Incidents ==
At a book signing in 2008, Yan was slapped twice in the face by a Han nationalist who objected to his views about the Qing dynasty during a book signing, which stirred much controversy on the Chinese internet at the time. The person who slapped him was reportedly inspired by the online literary work Usurping Ming.
