= Tang Juwu =

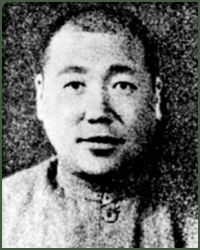
Tang Juwu

Tang Juwu, Tang Chu-wu, 唐聚五,(20 April 1898 – 18 May 1939), Chinese officer, general of one of the Anti-Japanese Volunteer Armies resisting the pacification of Manchukuo.

Tang Chu-wu joined the 27th Guard Brigade at the age of seventeen. While serving with the Northeastern Army Sixth Infantry Division he was sent to officer training in May 1926, graduating the following year. Tang Ju-wu had been the commander of the 1st Regiment of the eastern frontier defence force that was disbanded and interned by the Japanese during the early days of the invasion of Manchuria.

He grieved over the loss of his homeland and the humiliation of his countrymen. After his regiment was disarmed and interned without struggle by the Japanese, Tang Juwu escaped and then cut one of his fingers and wrote eight Chinese characters meaning "Kill the enemy, punish the traitors, save our country and love our people."

After escaping internment, the Northeast National Salvation Society appointed Tang as commander and helped him get in touch with smaller forces which others were organising in eastern Liaoning province. Tang also made use of his extensive personal contacts with police chiefs, officials, local gentry militias and the leaders of the semi-clandestine Big Swords Society. Tang Juwu accepted any recruits who were willing to fight against the invaders including bandits. He was able to develop the Northeast People's Anti-Japanese Volunteer Army with some 10,000 troops under his command.

In May 1932, Tang Juwu judged that the time was ripe for his army to go on the offensive. Tang's army, now 20,000 men surrounded the Japanese Tunghua garrison. In reaction the Japanese police and detachments of the Manchukuo Army attempted to relieve the siege in the First Tungpientao Clearance. The Japanese were unable to defeat Tang and his force threatened the region to the east of the important city of Mukden and communications with Korea. Based in the Tonghua area, his army fought with the Japanese Kwantung Army stationed in Shenyang and the Manchukuo army of South Liaoning province. Although all major cities had been lost, the volunteer armies gained a new lease of life during the summer of 1932 and reached their greatest strength.

On Oct 11th 1932, in the Second Tungpientao Subjugation Operation, two Japanese cavalry brigades, one mixed brigade, and 7 Manchukuo puppet brigades attacked Tang Juwu's forces in Tonghua & Hengren area. The threat of Japanese aerial bombardment of Tonghua forced Tang to withdraw from it in order to save the civilian population. After the defection of the Manchukuo 37th Route commander Wang Yongcheng, Tang Juwu was able to break through the Japanese encirclement to the west and escape. On October 16, the Japanese took over Tonghua, and on the 17th, Hengren, with 500 casualties. Tang and the remainder of his force were eventually forced to flee into Rehe.

When the battle of Rehe broke out early in 1933, he was made head of the Northeast Anti-Japanese Volunteer 3rd Corps. Unable to stand idle against the Japanese following the Tanggu Truce Tang joined the Chahar People's Anti-Japanese Army in May 1933. He was later taken back by the Nationalist army and given command of a regiment as part of Chiang Kai-shek's efforts to disperse the Anti Japanese Army and avoid war with the Japanese. After the outbreak of the Second Sino-Japanese War he was assigned to operate behind Japanese lines as a guerilla commander.

In September 1938, Tang Juwu's men engaged with the Japanese Army seven times at Huangzhuang Town, Baodi County in Eastern Hebei and suffered 120 casualties while claiming to have captured more than 20 rifles. In October, his men engaged with the Japanese Army three times in Xin'an Town, Baodi County and claimed the capture of more than 50 rifles and 4 light machine guns while destroying two enemy vehicles. In the same month, they fought four battles in Yutian County and lost 5 soldiers. In January and February 1939, they engaged with the Japanese Army nine times at Pingtai Mountain, Qian'an County and claimed the capture of more than 70 rifles and 8 light machine guns. In April, they fought five times at Qinglong County and Dushan County in Rehe Province with no losses. On May 18, 1939, the Japanese Army surrounded Tang Juwu and his men at Pingtai Mountain. Tang Juwu immediately ordered his forces to split into two groups and break out of the encirclement from two routes. The main force broke though to the north while Tang Juwu led a portion of his men to break out from the south but encountered the enemy. Tang Juwu personally led from the front and was hit with a bullet. Despite significant bleeding from his waist, he continued directing his men to fight. After a final fierce charge by the enemy with heavy machine guns, commander Tang and more than 200 of his men were all killed in action with only 3 survivors.

== Sources ==
- accessed May 24, 2013
- Coogan, Anthony (July 1993). "The volunteer armies of Northeast China". History Today. Vol. 43, no. 7. pp. 36–41. Archived from the original on 2012-10-18 – via Questia.
- Jowett, Phillip S., Rays of The Rising Sun, Armed Forces of Japan's Asian Allies 1931-45, Volume I: China & Manchuria, 2004. Helion & Co. Ltd., 26 Willow Rd., Solihull, West Midlands, England.
- 唐聚五纪念馆 from cn.netor.com accessed May 24, 2013 Biography and photo of Tang Juwu
- Biography and photo of Tang Juwu(唐聚五), from http://www.generals.dk accessed May 24, 2013
