= Yang Shengnan =

Chinese historian and palaeographer (1938–2019)

Yang Shengnan (Chinese: 杨升南; 26 February 1938 – 4 May 2019) was a Chinese historian and palaeographer who specialized in the oracle bone script and the pre-Qin dynasty history of ancient China.

== Biography ==
Yang was born on 26 February 1938 in Sanguanzhai Village, Pingchang County, Sichuan, Republic of China. He entered the Department of History at Sichuan University in 1959.

Upon graduation in 1964, Yang was assigned to work at the Pre-Qin History Research Group of the Institute of History of the Chinese Academy of Sciences (now under the Chinese Academy of Social Sciences). He spent decades studying oracle bones, and participated in the comprehensive compilations of oracle bone script under the eminent scholars Guo Moruo and Hu Houxuan. He was promoted to associate research professor in 1985 and full professor in 1993. He was also an adjunct professor at Anyang Normal University.

From 1996, Yang directed a national key research project which resulted in the publication of A Century of Oracle Bone Studies. The work won multiple national awards including the Guo Moruo History Prize and the First Prize of the Historical Research Award of the Chinese Academy of Social Sciences. He served as head of the Historical Document Research Group of the Xia–Shang–Zhou Chronology Project.

Yang wrote or co-authored dozens of books, including An Economic History of the Shang Dynasty, History of the Political Systems of the Spring and Autumn and Warring States Periods, A General Economic History of China (Pre-Qin).

In 2015, Yang donated more than 7,000 volumes of his book collection and manuscripts to the Jinsha Museum in Chengdu.

Yang died on 4 May 2019 in Beijing, at the age of 81.
