= Gao Wenbin =

Chinese historian (c.1921–2020)

Gao Wenbin (高文彬)
- Born: c. 1921
- Died: 7 September 2020; Shanghai, China
- Education: Soochow University (Suzhou)
- Occupations: historian, translator, university professor, jurist and educator
- Known for: last survivor to have witnessed the Tokyo Trial

Gao Wenbin (Chinese: 高文彬; pinyin: Gāo wénbīn) (c. 1921 – 7 September 2020) was a Chinese historian, translator, university professor, and jurist. He was notably the last surviving member of the Chinese delegation which represented the Republic of China at the Tokyo Trial to probe the Japanese war crimes during World War II.

== Career ==
Gao pursued his higher studies in the Anglo-American law and graduated from the Soochow University (Suzhou) in 1945 just after the surrender of Japan which eventually ended the World War II.

After the end of World War II, the International Military Tribunal for the Far East was initiated and Chinese prosecutor Xiang Zhejun planned to recruit English translators to translate the bulk of mass evidence which he found about Japanese deeds in China. The evidence was originally available in the Chinese language. Gao Wenbin's teacher Liu Shifang, a renowned lawyer and professor at Shanghai Soochow Law School who was also a classmate of the Chinese prosecutor Xiang Zhejun recommended Gao Wenbin to be the translator for Xiang Zhejun. Wenbin was appointed after passing a translation test conducted by Xiang Zhejun.

Gao Wenbin was also appointed as one of the prominent members of the Chinese delegation at the Tokyo Trial in 1946 due to his technical fluency with the Anglo-American law and also for his sound knowledge in both English and Japanese languages. He was responsible for collecting evidence regarding the Second Sino-Japanese War. Later he went onto serve as the secretary for Xiang supporting him with translations of documents. During Gao's time in Japan, he discovered the newspaper's 1937 report of Hundred man killing contest. Gao then send the newspaper to Chinese prosecutor Ni Yu, who then send this to Nanjing War Crimes Tribunal. After that, Chinese government request the SCAP to extradite Toshiaki Mukai and Tsuyoshi Noda, the two Japanese soldiers who conducted the killing contest. Later Mukai and Noda were extradite to China and being sentenced to death by Nanjing War Crime Tribunal. Both Mukai and Noda were executed in Nanjing in 1948.

In 1952, he was arrested by one of the teachers of the Soochow University Law School terming him as a "special suspect" and was sentenced to a minimum of ten years of labour reform. Prior to his arrest, he served in the Foreign Affairs Department of the Shanghai Naval Management Committee. Gao has been in Laogai for 27 years until his rehabilitation in 1979. After his rehabilitation, he was hired by Shanghai Maritime University as professor.

He joined the China Democratic League in 1985. In 1990s, he was invited to deliver lectures for over one and a half years at the University of Maine School of Law and at the University of California, Hastings College of the Law. He also taught maritime law and international law at the Shanghai Maritime University.

== Death ==
He died of a prolonged illness in the Shanghai First People's Hospital at the age of 99. He remained as the last person to have witnessed the entire Tokyo Trial. Prior to his death, he lived in an apartment in the Dong Changzhi Road, Shanghai.
