= Yuan Quan (chemist) =

Chinese chemist (1934–2023)

- 袁权
- Born: 2 November 1934; Shanghai, China
- Died: 29 October 2023 (aged 88); Dalian, Liaoning, China
- Education: Zhejiang University
- Scientific career
- Fields: Chemical engineering
- Workplaces: Dalian Institute of Chemical Physics, Chinese Academy of Sciences

Chinese name
- Simplified Chinese: 袁权
- Traditional Chinese: 袁權
Transcriptions
Standard Mandarin
- Hanyu Pinyin: Yuán Quán

Yuan Quan (Chinese: 袁权; 2 November 1934 – 29 October 2023) was a Chinese chemist who was director of the Dalian Institute of Chemical Physics from 1986 to 1994, and an academician of the Chinese Academy of Sciences.

He was a representative of the 14th National Congress of the Chinese Communist Party.

== Biography ==
Yuan was born in Shanghai, on 2 November 1934, while his ancestral home in Deqing County, Zhejiang. He graduated from Zhejiang University majoring in chemical engineering before gaining a master's degree from the Institute of Petroleum, Chinese Academy of Sciences (now Dalian Institute of Chemical Physics, Chinese Academy of Sciences).

After graduating in 1960, he stayed for researching. In November 1978, he became a visiting scholar at Stanford University. In 1986 he was promoted to become director of the Dalian Institute of Chemical Physics, a position he held until 1994.

On 29 October 2023, he died of an illness in Dalian, Liaoning, at the age of 88.

== Honours and awards ==
- 1991 Member of the Chinese Academy of Sciences (CAS)
- 2001 State Technological Invention Award (Second Class) for a high sulfur capacity impregnated activated carbon dry desulfurization agent and its application.
- 2001 Science and Technology Progress Award of the Ho Leung Ho Lee Foundation
