= Changzhou No.1 High School =

School in Changzhou, Jiangsu, China

Changzhou No.1 High School (formerly Zhengheng Middle School) is a four-star-rated high school in the Jiangsu Province, established in 1925. It was ranked number 29 in mainland China in terms of the number of students entering top American universities in 2016. It has the least holidays among all of the schools in the city. The school is located in the center of Changzhou. The campus covers an area of 117 acres, over 40% of it wooded. There are about 2000 students, and 170 faculty and staff.

== Notable alumni ==
- Tian Yang (2000-), Computer Scientist.
