= Collapse of Xinjia Express Hotel =

7 March 2020 building collapse in Quanzhou, Fujian, China

- Part of the COVID-19 pandemic
- Collapse of Xinjia Express Hotel (Fujian) Location of the hotel in Fujian
- Date: 7 March 2020; 6 years ago
- Time: 19:14 (CST, UTC+8)
- Location: 1688 Nanhuan Road, Licheng District, Quanzhou, Fujian; 24°54′58.31″N 118°29′59.15″E
- Cause: Overloading resulting from illegal construction
- Deaths: 29
- Injuries: 42
- Charges: 57.94 Million Yuan
- Survivors: 42
- Victims: 71

On 7 March 2020, Xinjia Express Hotel (Chinese: 欣佳酒店; pinyin: Xīnjiā Jiǔdiàn), a hotel in Licheng District, Quanzhou, Fujian, China, collapsed from overloading resulting from illegal construction, killing 29 people and injuring another 42, while being used to quarantine COVID-19 patients.

== Background ==
The 6.5-story Xinjia Hotel began operating in June 2018 and had 80 rooms on the 4th-7th floors. During the COVID-19 outbreak, this hotel was used for quarantining cases of COVID-19.

This particular building had been completed in July 2012, as a 4-story building with a mezzanine above the first floor, with additional floors added between existing floors during May 2016. Level 1 contained a car showroom, the hotel lobby and the supermarket undergoing construction to become a restaurant. Level 2, originally a mezzanine level, contained the offices of the car showroom, level 3 contained the hotel's restaurant and a foot spa, and levels 4,5 and 6 were the hotel guest rooms, each floor containing 22 rooms. Level 7 was used for accommodation of hotel and car showroom workers. The roof contained a 40 sqm office used by the owner of the building, the lift motor room, four plastic water containers and one stainless steel water container.

== Collapse ==
At 19:14 on 7 March 2020, the Xinjia Hotel suddenly collapsed. A witness said that he had heard a big bang from the external tempered glass of the hotel. He then witnessed the whole building collapsing within a few seconds. An employee of the hotel stated construction work had been done to the structure's foundation.

== Rescue ==
About 70 people were trapped in the collapsed hotel. After the collapse, Fujian Fire Brigade sent 26 fire engines and 147 firefighters to rescue the victims. 32 victims had been rescued by 21:50 that day. At 22:14, Putian Fire Brigade arrived at the hotel. At least 47 victims had been rescued by 8 March 2020. On 12 March 2020, all the 71 victims, including 29 dead bodies, were rescued.

== Investigation ==
The police started an investigation concerning Mr. Yang, the proprietor of the hotel.

On 10 March 2020, Shang Yong, the vice-minister of the Ministry of Emergency Management, said that the incident was relevant to the responsibility for safety in production, and that the incident would be investigated entirely and that legal responsibilities would be pursued.

On 12 March 2020, the State Council announced establishing a team to investigate the collapse, and appointed Fu Jianhua as the team leader.

The results of the investigation, published in July 2020, revealed that the owners had in May 2016 had added floors within the building, adding a total of two extra floors, which raised the load on the building slightly past its limit at 52100 kN, 100 kN over the design limit. When converting a ground floor supermarket to a restaurant on 10 January 2020, three supporting columns were found to be seriously deformed, though due to the Chinese New Year, work had not yet commenced until 1 March, where three more columns were discovered to be deformed. The repair works commenced on 5 March, with works done on five columns leading up to the collapse, with one column yet to have been repaired. However, the investigation revealed that the welds were not close enough to the next floor, leaving large gaps between the welds, resulting in the welds providing no additional support, and is concluded to have worsened the deformation of the columns, resulting in the collapse.

== See also ==
- COVID-19 pandemic in Fujian
