= Fang Chengguo =

Chinese banker

- 方诚国

President of the Bank of Communications
- In office June 2000 – May 2004
- Preceded by: Wang Mingquan
- Succeeded by: Zhang Jianguo

Personal details
- Born: December 14, 1943 Ningbo, Zhejiang, China
- Died: January 27, 2009 (aged 65) Huadong Hospital, Shanghai, China
- Party: Chinese Communist Party

Chinese name
- Simplified Chinese: 方诚国
- Traditional Chinese: 方誠國
Transcriptions
Standard Mandarin
- Hanyu Pinyin: Fāng Chéngguó
Yue: Cantonese
- Yale Romanization: Fong1 Sing4 Gwok3

Fang Chengguo (Chinese: 方诚国; 14 December 1943 – 27 January 2009) was a Chinese senior banker, governor/president of the Bank of Communications, and vice-president of the Agricultural Bank of China.

== Biography ==
Born in Zhenhai District, Ningbo, Zhejiang in December 1943, Fang joined the Chinese Communist Party in November 1963.

Fang first worked as a clerk in the Shanghai Branch of the People's Bank of China. He was continuously promoted into the positions of deputy group leader (副組長), group leader (組長), deputy director of the department (副處長).

Fang also worked in the Shanghai Branch of the Agricultural Bank of China, chronologically as the deputy director of the department (副處長), deputy director (副主任), director (主任), assistant for the governor of Shanghai Branch (分行助理), deputy governor of the Shanghai Branch (分行行長), and finally the governor of the branch. Then he was transferred to the headquarters of Agricultural Bank of China in Beijing, eventually promoted as the deputy governor of the Agricultural Bank of China.

Afterward, Fang worked in the Bank of Communications, first as its deputy governor, the Chinese Communist Party Deputy Committee Secretary, and the member of the board. Then he became the governor of the Bank of Communications, the secretary-in-general, and the vice-president of the board.

Business positions
Preceded by Wang Mingquan	President of the Bank of Communications; 2000–2004	Succeeded by Zhang Jianguo
