= Wang Mengshu =

Chinese engineer (1938–2018)

- 王梦恕
- Born: December 24, 1938; Wen County, Henan, China
- Died: September 20, 2018 (aged 79); Beijing, China
- Education: Southwest Jiaotong University
- Scientific career
- Fields: Tunnel and underground engineering
- Workplaces: Beijing Jiaotong University

Wang Mengshu (simplified Chinese: 王梦恕; traditional Chinese: 王夢恕; pinyin: Wāng Mèngshù; 24 December 1938 – 20 September 2018) was a Chinese tunnel and railway engineer. He was a key engineer behind China's first subway tunnel and the development of China's high-speed railways. Wang was an academician of the Chinese Academy of Engineering. He was a deputy to the 11th National People's Congress.

== Biography ==
Wang was born in Wen County, Henan on December 24, 1938. From September 1952 to August 1955 he studied architecture at Tianjin Railway Engineering Institute. After graduation, he was accepted to Tangshan Railway Institute (now Southwest Jiaotong University), studying tunnel and underground engineering under Gao Quqing (Chinese: 高渠清). After college, he was assigned to Beijing Metro Corporation, he began working on China's first underground subway line, Line 1 in Beijing.

In 1966, Mao Zedong launched the Cultural Revolution, Wang forced to work in the fields instead of working in the company. In 1978, Wang was transferred to the Scientific Research Institute of Chengdu Railway Administration as an engineer, where he worked there for more than 40 years. In 1981, Wang took part in designing and building the Dayaoshan tunnel between Pingshi and Lechang townships in south China's Guangdong province. The tunnel was completed in 1989. In 1995 he was elected a fellow of the Chinese Academy of Engineering. In his later years, he devoted his energy to building and expanding China's high-speed railway systems.

In September 2017, Wang was hospitalized with a cerebral hemorrhage. On September 20, 2018, Wang died in Beijing, aged 79.

== Awards ==
- 1992 Special prize in the National Science and Technology Progress Awards
