= Zhu Nenghong =

Chinese engineer (1939–2024)

- 朱能鸿
- Born: 10 November 1939; Shanghai, China
- Died: 8 March 2024 (aged 84); Shanghai, China
- Education: Tongji University
- Scientific career
- Fields: Astronomical optical telescope
- Workplaces: Shanghai Astronomical Observatory, Chinese Academy of Sciences

Chinese name
- Simplified Chinese: 朱能鸿
- Traditional Chinese: 朱能鴻
Transcriptions
Standard Mandarin
- Hanyu Pinyin: Zhū Nénghóng

Zhu Nenghong (Chinese: 朱能鸿; 10 November 1939 – 8 March 2024) was a Chinese astronomical optical telescope specialist who was chief engineer of the Shanghai Astronomical Observatory, and an academician of the Chinese Academy of Engineering. He was a member of the Chinese Communist Party (CCP).

== Biography ==
Zhu was born in Shanghai, on 10 November 1939, while his ancestral home is in Suzhou, Jiangsu. In 1956, he enrolled at Tongji University, where he majored in optical Technology and Instruments.

After university in 1960, he was assigned to the Shanghai Astronomical Observatory. There, he was in turn a senior engineer, a deputy chief engineer, a vice president, and finally chief engineer. In 1989, he led the design and development of China's first 1.56-meter astronomical measurement telescope. He joined the Chinese Communist Party (CCP) in April 1979.

On 8 March 2024, he died in Shanghai, at the age of 84.

== Honours and awards ==
- 1991 State Science and Technology Progress Award (First Class) for the design and development of the 1.56-meter astronomical measurement telescope.
- 1995 Member of the Chinese Academy of Engineering (CAE)
- 2002 Science and Technology Progress Award of the Ho Leung Ho Lee Foundation
