= Zheng Chengsi =

Chinese intellectual property expert

Zheng Chengsi (Chinese characters: 郑成思; Pinyin: Zhèng Chéngsī; December, 1944 – September 10, 2006) was a Chinese expert on intellectual property, the Director of Intellectual Property Center of Chinese Academy of Social Sciences.

== Biography ==
Zheng Chengsi has worked at the Chinese Academy of Social Sciences since 1979. He studied at the graduate school of the London School of Economics from 1981 to 1983.

In 1994, Zheng was selected as an arbitrator of the Arbitration Center of the World Intellectual Property Organization, and became the Director of the Intellectual Property Center of the Chinese Academy of Social Sciences.

Zheng was the deputy to the 9th and 10th National People's Congress, member of the Law Committee.

Zheng died of illness in Beijing on September 10, 2006.
