= Playhouse Disney (Hong Kong TV channel) =

Playhouse Disney Hong Kong
- Country: Hong Kong
- Broadcast area: Kowloon Peninsula
- Network: Playhouse Disney
- Headquarters: Hong Kong Disneyland Hotel, Hong Kong Disneyland, Penny's Bay, Lantau Island, Hong Kong

Programming
- Languages: English; Cantonese; Chinese
- Picture format: SDTV (480i 4:3); PAL (576i 4:3); HDTV (1080i 16:9)

Ownership
- Owner: The Walt Disney Company
- Sister channels: Disney Channel Hong Kong

History
- Launched: 2 April 2004
- Closed: 11 July 2011
- Replaced by: Disney Junior Hong Kong

Links
- Website: Playhouse Disney Hong Kong Website

Availability

Terrestrial
- Hong Kong Disneyland (Hong Kong): Channel 8 (English); Channel 9 (Cantonese); Channel 10 (Chinese)

Playhouse Disney Hong Kong was a Playhouse Disney-branded pay cable television channel for viewers in Hong Kong based in Kowloon Peninsula and is available in three national languages: English, Cantonese and Mandarin. This channel was only available on Cable TV Hong Kong in Hong Kong on Channel 136, Now TV in Hong Kong on Channel 442 and HKBN bbTV in Hong Kong on Channel 312. The previous name for Playhouse Disney Hong Kong was Disney Channel Asia. English, Cantonese and Mandarin languages were available 24 hours daily.

== Availability ==
Country	Network		Channel
Hong Kong	Free-to-air	Hong Kong Disneyland	Channel 8 (English)
Hong Kong	Free-to-air	Hong Kong Disneyland	Channel 9 (Cantonese)
Hong Kong	Free-to-air	Hong Kong Disneyland	Channel 10 (Chinese)
Hong Kong	Subscription	Cable TV Hong Kong	Channel 136
Hong Kong	IPTV	Now TV	Channel 442
Hong Kong	IPTV	HKBN bbTV	Channel 312
