= Cao Chunxiao =

Chinese materials scientist (1934–2023)

- 曹春晓
- Born: 6 August 1934; Shangyu County, Zhejiang, China
- Died: 23 November 2023 (aged 89); Beijing, China
- Education: Shanghai Jiao Tong University
- Spouse: Zhang Beilian
- Scientific career
- Fields: Materials science
- Workplaces: Beijing Institute of Aeronautical Materials

Chinese name
- Simplified Chinese: 曹春晓
- Traditional Chinese: 曹春曉
Transcriptions
Standard Mandarin
- Hanyu Pinyin: Cáo Chūnxiǎo

Cao Chunxiao (Chinese: 曹春晓; 6 August 1934 – 23 November 2023) was a Chinese materials scientist, and an academician of the Chinese Academy of Sciences. Cao is best known for developing the first aircraft engine in China equipped with titanium alloy blades. Cao was a member of the Chinese Communist Party (CCP).

== Biography ==
Cao was born into a merchant family, in Shangyu County (now Shangyu District of Shaoxing), Zhejiang, on 6 August 1934. In 1937, his family moved to Shanghai and settled down in the Shanghai French Concession due to the Second Sino-Japanese War.

After graduating from the Department of Mechanical Engineering, Shanghai Jiao Tong University in 1956, he worked in the newly established national defense research unit - Beijing Institute of Aeronautical Materials (now AVIC Beijing Institute of Aeronautical Materials), until his retirement.

On 23 November 2023, he died from an illness in Beijing, at the age of 89.

== Personal life ==
Cao married Zhang Beilian (张琲联).

== Honours and awards ==
- 1987 State Science and Technology Progress Award (First Class) for the process research on TC11 titanium alloy material and disc die forgings.
- 1995 State Technological Invention Award (Third Class) for the titanium alloy BRCT heat treatment process
- 1997 Member of the Chinese Academy of Sciences (CAS)
- 1999 State Science and Technology Progress Award (Second Class) for the application research of 550 °C high temperature titanium alloy
