= Ji Liangnian =

Chinese chemist (1934–2024)

- 计亮年
- Born: 20 April 1934; Shanghai, China
- Died: 2 April 2024 (aged 89); Guangzhou, Guangdong, China
- Education: Shandong University
- Scientific career
- Fields: Bioinorganic chemistry
- Workplaces: Sun Yat-sen University

Chinese name
- Simplified Chinese: 计亮年
- Traditional Chinese: 計亮年
Transcriptions
Standard Mandarin
- Hanyu Pinyin: Jì Liàngnián

Ji Liangnian (Chinese: 计亮年; 20 April 1934 – 2 April 2024) was a Chinese chemist who was a professor at Sun Yat-sen University, and an academician of the Chinese Academy of Sciences.

== Biography ==
Ji was born in Shanghai, on 20 April 1934, to Ji Zhuqing (计竹卿), a staff member of The Times in Shanghai. He was the youngest of 6 children. In July 1937, the Lugou Bridge Incident broke out, and the following month, the Imperial Japanese Army occupied Shanghai, causing his father to lose his job and the family's life to become difficult. In 1940, by the age of 6, his mother died of tuberculosis; three years later, his father also died of tuberculosis.

In 1948, he began working as an apprentice at a leather goods workshop to make a living. After the liberation of Shanghai in May 1949, he completed middle and high school courses with a work-study program. In 1952, he enrolled at Shandong University, where he majored in the Department of Chemistry. After graduating in 1956, he studied in the Radiochemistry Research Class of the Department of Technology at Peking University, serving as a teaching assistant and visiting scholar. In September 1959, he went to the Chemistry Research Class of the Department of Chemistry at Nanjing University for further studies, under the guidance of Prof. Dai Anbang and Soviet expert Savage.

He became a lecturer at Hengyang Mining and Metallurgical Engineering Institute in September 1960 before being assigned to the similar position in Guangdong Institute of Mining and Metallurgy (now Guangdong University of Technology) in September 1972. In November 1975, he was recruited as a lecturer at Sun Yat-sen University, where he was promoted to full professor in 1986 and dean of the School of Chemistry and Chemical Engineering in 1994. He joined the Chinese Communist Party (CCP) in January 1981. In 1982, he became a visiting scholar at Northwestern University in the United States. He retired in October 2018.

On 2 April 2024, he died from an illness in Guangzhou, Guangdong, at the age of 89.

== Contributions ==
In 1982, during Ji's visit to Northwestern University in the United States, he first discovered the "indene dynamic effect" internationally and was hailed as one of the three contributors to the discovery.

== Honours and awards ==
- 1989 Fellow of the Royal Society of Chemistry (RSC)
- 2003 Member of the Chinese Academy of Sciences (CAS)
