= Mao Jiangsen =

Chinese virologist (1934–2023)

- 毛江森
- Born: Mao Weishu (毛维书); 15 January 1934; Jiangshan County, Jiangsu, China
- Died: 18 May 2023 (aged 89); Hangzhou, Zhejiang, China
- Education: Shanghai Medical College, Fudan University
- Scientific career
- Fields: Virology
- Workplaces: Hangzhou Medical College

Mao Jiangsen (Chinese: 毛江森; pinyin: Máo Jiāngsēn; 15 January 1934 – 18 May 2023) was a Chinese virologist, and an academician of the Chinese Academy of Sciences.

He was a representative of the 14th and 15th National Congress of the Chinese Communist Party.

== Biography ==
Mao was born Mao Weishu (毛维书; 毛維書) into a family of farming background in Jiangshan County (now Jiangshan), Jiangsu, on 15 January 1934. He attended Hecang Village Primary School (贺仓村小学), Qinghu Central Primary School (清湖镇中心小学), Jiangshan County Middle School (江山县立中学), Hangzhou Xinqun High School (私立杭州新群高级中学), and Zhejiang Provincial Hangzhou High school (浙江省立杭州高级中学). He joined the Communist Youth League of China in January 1951 and in September enrolled at the National Shanghai Medical College (now Shanghai Medical College, Fudan University). He became a member of the Chinese Communist Party in October 1953.

After university in 1957, he was despatched to the Department of Virology, Chinese Academy of Medical Sciences. In early 1958, he was sent to a natural village in Shangyuan Township, Changping County (now Changping District of Beijing) to do farm works, and returned to the Chinese Academy of Medical Sciences in May 1963.

In 1966, the Cultural Revolution broke out, he was transferred to Anmenkou Commune Health Center in Kang County, northwest China's Gansu province. In September 1972, he became a member of the Gansu Provincial Health and Epidemic Prevention Station. He went with the medical and health team of Gansu to the 1976 Tangshan earthquake disaster area for medical assistance in 1976.

In January 1978, he was transferred to Zhejiang Provincial People's Health Experimental Institute (now Zhejiang Academy of Medical Sciences). In March 1987, he became a researcher at Zhejiang Medical Research Institute, and served as vice president in June of that same year. He moved up the rank to become president in July 1991. He retired in July 2018.

He died of an illness in Hangzhou, Zhejiang, on 18 May 2023, aged 89.

== Honours and awards ==
- November 1991 Member of the Chinese Academy of Sciences (CAS)
- 2001 State Science and Technology Progress Award (Second Class) for the protective effect and immune strategy of live attenuated hepatitis a vaccine.
