= Huang Xiaode =

Chinese lexicographer

Huang Xiaode (Chinese: 黄孝德, March 1934 - September 4, 2020), a native of Pingjiang, Hunan, was a Chinese exegete and lexicographer. He is a professor of the Chinese Department of Wuhan University and a member of the Chinese Dictionary Society (Chinese: 中国辞书学会).

He graduated from Wuhan University in 1962, where he studied under Liu Ze (Chinese: 刘赜) and Huang Zhuo (Chinese: 黄焯). After 1975, he served as a member of the Wuhan University writing team for the Hanyu Da Zidian. He died on September 4, 2020, at the age of 87 in Wuhan.
