= Liu Ruozhuang =

Chinese physical chemist and academician (1925–2020)

- 刘若庄
- Born: May 25, 1925; Beijing, China
- Died: October 8, 2020 (aged 95); Beijing, China
- Education: Fu Jen Catholic University
- Scientific career
- Fields: Quantum chemistry
- Workplaces: Peking Normal University

Chinese name
- Traditional Chinese: 劉若莊
- Simplified Chinese: 刘若庄
Transcriptions
Standard Mandarin
- Hanyu Pinyin: Liú Ruòzhuāng

Liu Ruozhuang (Chinese: 刘若庄; 25 May 1925 - 8 October 2020) was a Chinese physical chemist and academician of the Chinese Academy of Sciences (CAS). He was the founder of computational chemistry in China.

== Biography ==
Liu was born in Beijing, on May 25, 1925. In 1943, he entered Fu Jen Catholic University, majoring in chemistry at the Department of Chemistry. After graduating in 1947, he did his postgraduate work at Peking University. In 1949, he published his first research paper "Modified Troutons Rule" in the Journal of the Chinese Chemical Society. In June 1950, he began to study quantum chemistry under the supervision of Tang Aoqing. In September 1951, he was hired as a lecturer at Peking University and Fu Jen Catholic University. In 1952, after the adjustment of colleges and departments, he taught at Beijing Normal University, where he was promoted to associate professor in September 1956 and to full professor in July 1979. He joined the Jiusan Society in 1956. In 1978, he founded the Laboratory of Quantum Chemistry at Beijing Normal University. He joined the Chinese Communist Party in 1984. He became a visiting professor at the National Autonomous University of Mexico in the following year. He died in Beijing, on October 8, 2020.

== Selected papers ==
- R. Z. Liu; J. G. Yu (1983). "Theoretical Study of the Effect of Substituents on Electrophilic Addition to Olefins: Ab Initio MO Approach with Energy Decomposition". Int. J. Quantum Chem. 23 (2): 491–495. doi:10.1002/qua.560230219.
- S. Q. Jin; R. Z. Liu (1984). "Quantum Chemical Study of the Electrophilic Addition Reaction of Iodine to Ethylene". Int. J. Quantum Chem. 25 (4): 699–705. doi:10.1002/qua.560250408.
- R. Z. Liu (1986). "Quantum Chemical Studies on Reaction Mechanism and Reaction Path". In Smith, V. H.; Schaefer, H. F.; Morokuma, K. (eds.). Applied Quantum Chemistry. pp. 85–91. doi:10.1007/978-94-009-4746-7_7. ISBN 978-94-010-8609-7.
- J. G. Yu; X. Y. Fu; R. Z. Liu; K. Yamashita; N. Koga; K. Morokuma (1986). "Theoretical Study of Structure and Energies of [HCOO]^{+} and [COOH]^{+} and Their Rearrangement". Chem. Phys. Lett. 125 (5–6): 438–442. Bibcode:1986CPL...125..438Y. doi:10.1016/0009-2614(86)87074-9.
- H. Q. Zhang; Y. H. Huang; R. Z. Liu (1993). "Deformation Potential Approach to the Estimation of Peierls Phase Transition Temperature". Physica Status Solidi B. 178 (1): 151. Bibcode:1993PSSBR.178..151Z. doi:10.1002/pssb.2221780114.
- R. Z. Liu; S. Y. Ma; Z. H. Li (1994). "Theoretical Study on the Dynamic Properties and State Selected Rate Constants of the Reaction CH(^{4}Σ^{−})+H_{2}→CH_{2}(^{3}B_{1})+H". Chem. Phys. Lett. 219 (1–2): 143–150. doi:10.1016/0009-2614(94)00036-0.
- Z. X. Wang; R. Z. Liu; M. B. Huang; Z. H. Yu (1996). "An ab Initio Study on the Insertion Reactions of CH(X^{2}II) with NH_{3}，H_{2}O and HF". Can. J. Chem. 74 (6): 910–917. doi:10.1139/v96-100.
- Y. Huang; R. Z. Liu (1997). "Investigation of the Change in Band Structure of a Carbon Nanotube Due to a Distortion Keeping the Initial Translational Symmetry". Chem. Phys. Lett. 268 (5): 364. Bibcode:1997CPL...268..365H. doi:10.1016/S0009-2614(97)00227-3.
- Li, Y.; Huang, Y.; Du, Shixuan; Liu, Ruozhuang (2001). "Structures and stabilities of C_{60}-rings". Chemical Physics Letters. 335 (5–6): 524–532. Bibcode:2001CPL...335..524L. doi:10.1016/S0009-2614(01)00064-1.

== Honours and awards ==
- 1982 State Natural Science Award (First Class)
- 1989 State Natural Science Award (Third Class)
- 1999 Member of the Chinese Academy of Sciences (CAS)
