= Liu Caipin =

Taiwanese astronomer and politician

- Born: 1936 (age 89–90); China
- Education: University of Tokyo
- Occupations: Astronomer, politician

Liu Caipin (刘彩品) is a former Chinese politician, born in 1936 in China. She was a member of the National People's Congress.

== Academic life ==
Liu Caipin was a Chinese astronomer and politician. She was born in 1936 in China and studied astronomy at the University of Tokyo in 1955. After graduating, she married Kimura Hiroshi, also an astronomer, and they had two children. In 1971, the couple returned to China and worked at the Purple Mountain Observatory in Nanjing.

Caipin published many articles in the field of astronomy, most of which were written in collaboration with her husband. Her most cited article, "Detection of infall motion from the circumstellar disk associated with the exciting source of HH 111," was published in 1997 and has been cited 31 times.

== Political life ==
In 1981, Caipin began her political career when she was appointed as the first president of the council of the All-China Federation of Taiwan Compatriots. The aim of this role was to serve as a liaison between mainland China and Taiwan in order to improve relations. She also played a key role in the development and passing of the Civil Servant Law of the People's Republic of China.

In 1990, Caipin was involved with a lawsuit against Japan for the war crimes committed by the Japanese military during World War II, such as the Rape of Nanking.

Caipin currently lives Saitama, Japan.
