= Wang Fuchun =

Chinese photographer and railway worker (1943–2021)

Wang Fuchun photographing people on a train

Wang Fuchun (Chinese: 王福春; 1943–2021) was a Chinese photographer and railway worker.

In 1963, he trained as an engine driver in Suihua, in Heilongjiang and, after working in a variety of roles on the railway, became a photographer in 1984.

He specialised in taking pictures of people on trains and these were collected in Chinese on the Train in 2001. He took thousands of train journeys, covering over 100,000 kilometers and took over 200,000 photographs with his Seagull camera. He kept the rolls of film which took up most of the space in his home.

In 1996, he won the Golden Statue of the China Photographers Association – the premier award for individual photography in China. In 2004, he won an award as "Outstanding Chinese photographer" at the Pingyao International Photography Festival. In 2014, he was listed as one of the most influential photographers by Invisible Photographer Asia. In 2019, his photographs were exhibited at the National Railway Museum in York.

Wang Fuchun died from an undisclosed illness on March 13, 2021.
