= Wang Zhonggao =

Surgeon

- 汪忠镐
- Born: 28 July 1937; Xiaoshan County, Zhejiang, China
- Died: 3 November 2023 (aged 86); Beijing, China
- Education: Shanghai Medical College, Fudan University
- Scientific career
- Fields: Vascular surgery
- Workplaces: Capital Medical University

Chinese name
- Simplified Chinese: 汪忠镐
- Traditional Chinese: 汪忠鎬
Transcriptions
Standard Mandarin
- Hanyu Pinyin: Wāng Zhōnggǎo

Wang Zhonggao (Chinese: 汪忠镐; 28 July 1937 – 3 November 2023) was a Chinese vascular surgeon who was a professor at Capital Medical University, and an academician of the Chinese Academy of Sciences.

== Biography ==
Wang was born in Xiaoshan County (now Xiaoshan District), Zhejiang, on 28 July 1937. He attended the Zhejiang Provincial Xiaoshan High School.

After graduating from Shanghai First Medical College (now Shanghai Medical College, Fudan University) in 1961, he was despatched to Peking Union Medical College Hospital, where he worked under Prof. Zeng Xianjiu. In 1979, he became a visiting scholar at Duke University and the University of North Carolina. He returned to China in 1981. He joined the Jiusan Society in 1982. In 1986, he was transferred to Beijing Cardiopulmonary Vascular Center - Anzhen Hospital, he remained in the hospital until 1992, when he was transferred again to the 8th Clinical College of Peking University - Institute of Vascular Surgery, General Hospital of Posts and Telecommunications. In 2000, he was hired by the Vascular Research Institute of the 1st Hospital of School of Medicine, Zhejiang University, and in January 2004 moved to the Institute of Vascular Surgery of Xuanwu Hospital, Capital Medical University.

On 3 November 2023, he died from an illness in Beijing, at the age of 86.

== Honours and awards ==
- December 2005 Member of the Chinese Academy of Sciences (CAS)
