= 2007 in Hong Kong =

- Decades: 1980s; 1990s; 2000s; 2010s; 2020s
- See also: Other events of 2007; History of Hong Kong • Timeline • Years

Events in the year 2007 in Hong Kong.

== Incumbents ==
- Chief Executive: Donald Tsang

== Events ==
In January 2007, rules were passed to limit the number of pregnant women from mainland China who could give birth in Hong Kong, thus obtaining residency rights for their children.

In March 2007, Chief Executive Donald Tsang won elections for a new five-year term.

In July 2007, with the 10th anniversary of Hong Kong's handover to China, Tsang's new government is sworn in.

== See also ==
- List of Hong Kong films of 2007
