= 2020 in China =

- Decades: 2000s; 2010s; 2020s
- See also: Other events of 2020; History of China • Timeline • Years

The following lists events that happened during 2020 in China.

== Incumbents ==
- General Secretary of the Communist Party – Xi Jinping
- President – Xi Jinping
- Vice President – Wang Qishan
- Premier – Li Keqiang
- Congress chairman – Li Zhanshu
- Consultative Conference chairman – Wang Yang
- Supervision Commission director – Yang Xiaodu

=== Governors ===
- Governor of Anhui Province – Li Guoying
- Governor of Fujian Province – Tang Dengjie (until 2 July), Wang Ning (starting 2 July)
- Governor of Gansu Province – Tang Renjian
- Governor of Guangdong Province – Ma Xingrui
- Governor of Guizhou Province – Shen Yiqin (until 24 November), Ma Xingrui (starting November)
- Governor of Hainan Province – Shen Xiaoming (until 2 December), Feng Fei (starting December 2)
- Governor of Hebei Province – Xu Qin
- Governor of Heilongjiang Province: – Wang Wentao (until December), vacant thereafter (starting December)
- Governor of Henan Province – Yin Hong
- Governor of Hubei Province – Wang Xiaodong
- Governor of Hunan Province – Xu Dazhe (until November), Mao Weiming (starting November)
- Governor of Jiangsu Province – Wu Zhenglong
- Governor of Jiangxi Province – Yi Lianhong
- Governor of Jilin Province – Jing Junhai (until 25 November), Han Jun (starting November)
- Governor of Liaoning Province – Tang Yijun (until April), Liu Ning (starting April)
- Governor of Qinghai Province – Liu Ning
- Governor of Shaanxi Province – Liu Guozhong (until August), Zhao Yide (from August)
- Governor of Shandong Province – Gong Zheng (until April 17), vacant thereafter (starting April 17)
- Governor of Shanxi Province – Lin Wu
- Governor of Sichuan Province – Yin Li (until 2 December), Huang Qiang (politician) (starting 2 December)
- Governor of Zhejiang Province – Yuan Jiajun (until 4 September), Zheng Shanjie (starting September)

== Events ==
=== January ===
- January 20 – Chinese Premier Li Keqiang has urged efforts to prevent and control Coronavirus disease 2019.
- January 26 – Leading group on the prevention and control of Coronavirus disease 2019 was established, led by Li Keqiang. The leading group has decided to extend Spring Festival holiday to contain the COVID-19 pandemic.
- January 27 – Li Keqiang visited Wuhan, center of what became the COVID-19 pandemic, to direct the epidemic prevention work.
- January 28 – The opening of Dabie Mountain Regional Medical Centre in Huangzhou District, Huanggang, Hubei.
- January 30 – At the World Health Organization's second meeting of the Emergency Committee declared the Wuhan outbreak of novel coronavirus a Public Health Emergency of International Concern (PHEIC).

=== February ===
- February 3 – Huoshenshan Hospital accepted patients after a speedy construction build period.
- February 6 – Leishenshan Hospital passed evaluations and will begin accepting patients soon.
- February 10 – An advance World Health Organization team of medical experts has arrived in China, led by Dr. Bruce Aylward, who coordinated the WHO's Ebola Response in 2016.
- February 28 – Three time Chinese Olympic swimming champion, Sun Yang, has been given an 8-year ban for missing a doping test in September 2018 by the Court of Arbitration for Sport.

=== March ===
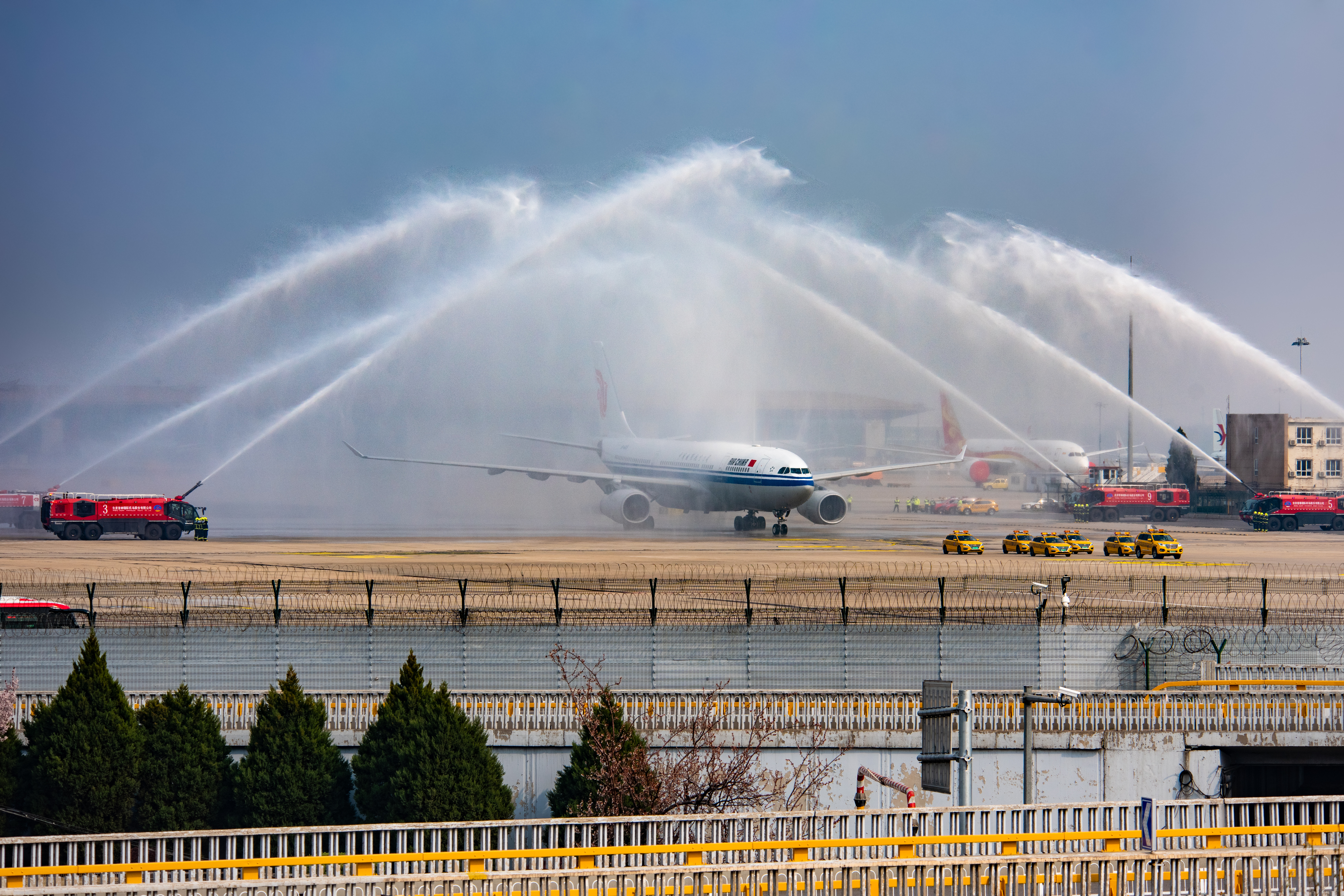
Beijing medical team aiding Hubei returned to Beijing on March 31, 2020, with their flight receiving water salute at Beijing Capital International Airport

- March 7 – Collapse of Xinjia Express Hotel
- March 10 – Chinese Communist Party general secretary Xi Jinping visits Wuhan, the origin of the COVID-19 pandemic, after an unprecedented lockdown of the central city of 11 million people.
- March 24 – Chinese Premier Li Keqiang reported that spread of the domestically transmitted epidemic has been basically blocked and the COVID-19 pandemic has been controlled in China.
- March 28 – A tailings dam fails at the Yichun Luming mine.

=== April ===
- April 4 – Coinciding with the Qingming Festival, a national day of mourning was declared followed by a three-minute silence to honor 3,300+ people who died of COVID-19.

=== May ===
- May 9 – Several Indian and Chinese soldiers were injured in a cross-border clash at the Nathu La crossing. Around one hundred and fifty troops clashed in a "standoff" that included fistfights and stone-throwing.

=== June ===
- June 26 – Nearly 50 independent United Nations Human Rights experts highlighted their concern on the situation in China. They voiced concern for many actions including but not limited to allegations of forced labor; arbitrary interferences with the right to privacy; restrictive cybersecurity, anti-terrorism, and sedition laws; the retaliation against journalists, medical workers and others speaking out about COVID-19; the repression of ethnic minorities in Xinjiang and Tibet; and the repression of protests and democracy advocacy in the Hong Kong Special Administrative Region (SAR). They urged China to "withdraw the draft national security law for Hong Kong".

=== July ===
- July 7 – Anshun bus crash

=== September ===
- September 22 – During the 2020 United Nations General Assembly, President Xi Jinping announces that China will aim to hit peak emissions before 2030 and for carbon neutrality by 2060.

== Popular culture ==
=== Film ===
- List of Chinese films of 2020

== Deaths ==
- January 1 – Jiao Ruoyu, politician and diplomat
- February 7 – Li Wenliang, ophthalmologist
- March 17 – Meng Sufen, politician
- September 7 – Gao Wenbin, historian and jurist

== See also ==
=== Country overviews ===
- China
- History of China
- History of modern China
- Outline of China
- Government of China
- Politics of China
- Timeline of Chinese history
- Years in China

=== Related timelines for current period ===
- 2020
- 2020 in politics and government
- 2020s

== Links ==
- Media related to 2020 in China at Wikimedia Commons
