= Wang Chonghui =

Chinese jurist, diplomat and politician (1881–1958)

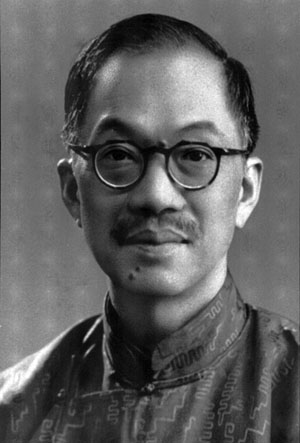

Minister of Foreign Affairs
- In office 4 March 1937 – 10 April 1941
- Premier: Chiang Kai-shek; H. H. Kung
- Preceded by: Zhang Qun
- Succeeded by: Quo Tai-chi

Premier of China
- In office 5 August 1922 – 29 November 1922
- President: Li Yuanhong
- Preceded by: Yan Huiqing
- Succeeded by: Wang Daxie (acting)

Personal details
- Born: 10 October 1881 British Hong Kong
- Died: 15 March 1958 (aged 76) Taipei, Taiwan
- Party: Kuomintang
- Relations: Wang Chongyou (brother)
- Children: Wang Da-hong (son)
- Education: Peiyang University (LLB); University of California, Berkeley; Yale University (LLM, DCL)

Wang Chonghui (Chinese: 王寵惠; pinyin: Wáng Chǒnghuì; Wade–Giles: Wang Ch'ung-hui; 10 October 1881 – 15 March 1958) was a prominent Chinese jurist, diplomat and politician who served the Republic of China from its foundation in 1912 until his death in 1958. He was a close associate of the republic's founding father, Sun Yat-sen, an active member of the Kuomintang ("Chinese Nationalist Party"), and a judge on the Permanent Court of International Justice in the Hague.

Wang Chonghui
- Traditional Chinese: 王寵惠
- Simplified Chinese: 王宠惠
Transcriptions
Standard Mandarin
- Hanyu Pinyin: Wáng Chǒnghuì
- Wade–Giles: Wang² Ch'ung³-hui⁴
Yue: Cantonese
- Jyutping: Wong^{4} Cung^{2}-wai^{6}

== Early life and education ==
Wang was born in Hong Kong in 1881 with his ancestral home in Dongguan. He studied law at Peiyang University (later merged with Tianjin University) and graduated in 1900. After briefly teaching at Nanyang Public School, in 1901 he continued his study in Japan, and later traveled to the United States to pursue graduate studies at the University of California, Berkeley, and Yale University. He earned a Master of Laws (LL.M.) in 1903 and his Doctor of Civil Law (D.C.L.) from Yale Law School in 1905, writing dissertations for both degrees with a specialization in international law and comparative law. His LL.M. thesis was titled, "China and the United States, Being a History of the Development of the Commercial and Political Relations Between the Two Countries". His doctoral thesis was titled, "Domicil: A Study in Comparative Law".

Wang was called to the bar by the Middle Temple in 1907. That same year, his translation of the German Civil Code (of 1896) into English was published. During 1907 and 1911, he studied comparative law in Germany and France.

He returned to China from London in the autumn of 1911, and when the anti-dynastic Xinhai Revolution of October 10 began, he became adviser to Chen Qimei, the revolutionary military governor of Shanghai. He represented Guangdong at the Nanjing convention which elected Dr. Sun Yat-sen provisional president of the Republic of China.

== Shanghai ==
In 1912, Wang was designated first minister of foreign affairs of the Republic of China. After the rise of Yuan Shikai, Wang was named minister of justice in the cabinet of Tang Shaoyi. He participated in drafting the republic's provisional constitution of 1912. Tang resigned in June 1912, and a month later Wang did the same. He moved to Shanghai and assumed the roles of vice-chancellor of Fudan University and chief editor of the Zhonghua Book Company.

== Guangzhou ==
Though he stayed out of some major political events during the early anti-Yuan era, in May 1916 he became deputy commissioner for foreign affairs of the military council in Guangzhou, headed by Liang Qichao and Cai E.

Wang served as chief justice of the Chinese supreme court in 1920 and justice minister of the Beiyang government of Li Yuanhong in June 1922. He briefly served as acting prime minister from September to November 1922.

It was amid continued political power struggles and warlord rivalries that Wang gladly accepted an appointment as deputy judge of the Permanent Court of International Justice in the Hague from 1923 to 1925.

== Beijing ==
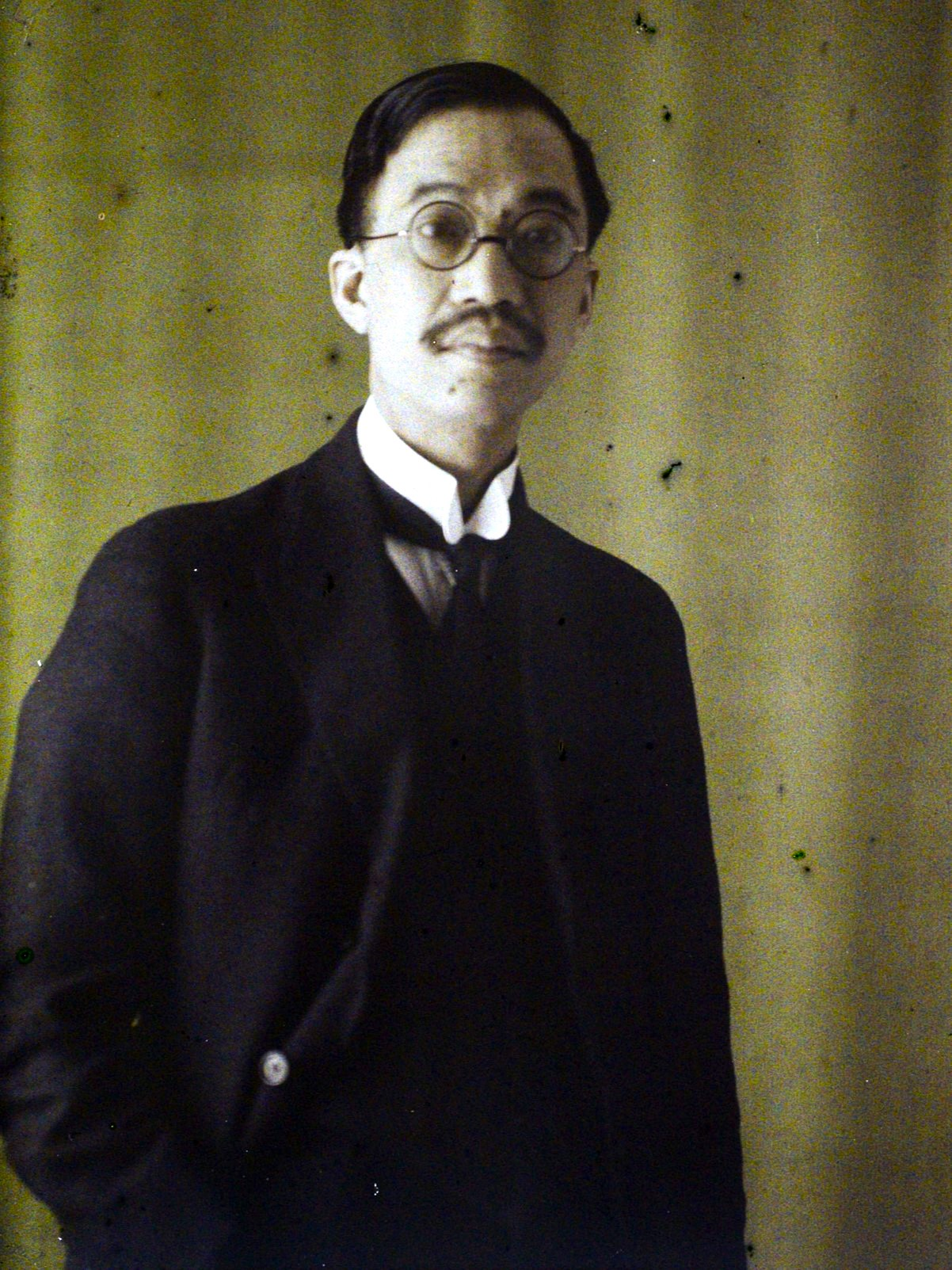
Autochrome by Roger Dumas, 1923

Wang returned to Beijing in 1925. In 1926, he was elected to the Central Supervisory Committee of the northern government and he also briefly served as minister of education under prime minister W.W. Yen. In mid-1927, he left Beijing and joined Chiang Kai-shek's Nanjing government, serving as justice minister. He was fundamental in formulating the principles underlying the Republic of China's criminal and civil codes. When the Judicial Yuan was created in 1928, Wang was its first president. He retained that post, and became a member of the State Council, from 1928 to 1931. During these years, he worked to rid China of the extraterritoriality imposed by European powers and Japan. A loyal follower of Sun Yat-sen, Wang also worked to move China into the "political tutelage" phase of the revolution which would pave the way for China to become a constitutional democracy.

In 1930, Wang was elected judge on the Permanent Court of International Justice, but he delayed his acceptance as he was guiding the process of drawing up the provisional constitution of 1931. He assumed his post in the Hague in 1931, and served out his term until 1936. He returned to China that year and was seen as a moderating influence in Nanjing during the Xi'an Incident in December of that year.

Wang Chonghui served as foreign minister from March 1937 - April 1941, a painful time during which Japanese invasion would kill millions of Chinese civilians and force the ROC government to relocate from Nanjing to a provisional capital in Chongqing. On August 21, 1937, he signed the Sino-Soviet Non-Aggression Pact with Soviet ambassador Dmitry Bogomolov. This guaranteed the Soviet Union's financial support to the Kuomintang government, though they continued supporting Communist insurgents too.

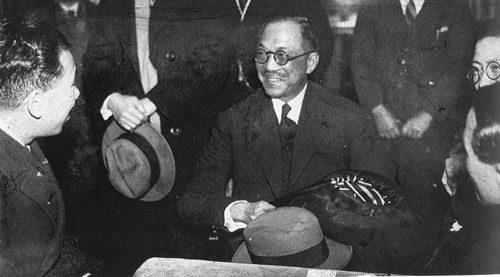
Wang Chonghui talks about the Sino-Japanese relationship with Japanese reporters as Foreign Minister of the Republic of China in March 1937.

In 1942, Wang became secretary general of the Chinese Supreme Defense Council. In this capacity, he accompanied President Chiang Kai-shek to India in 1942 and the Cairo Conference in 1943. In 1943, he also began serving on the People's Political Council.

== Taipei ==
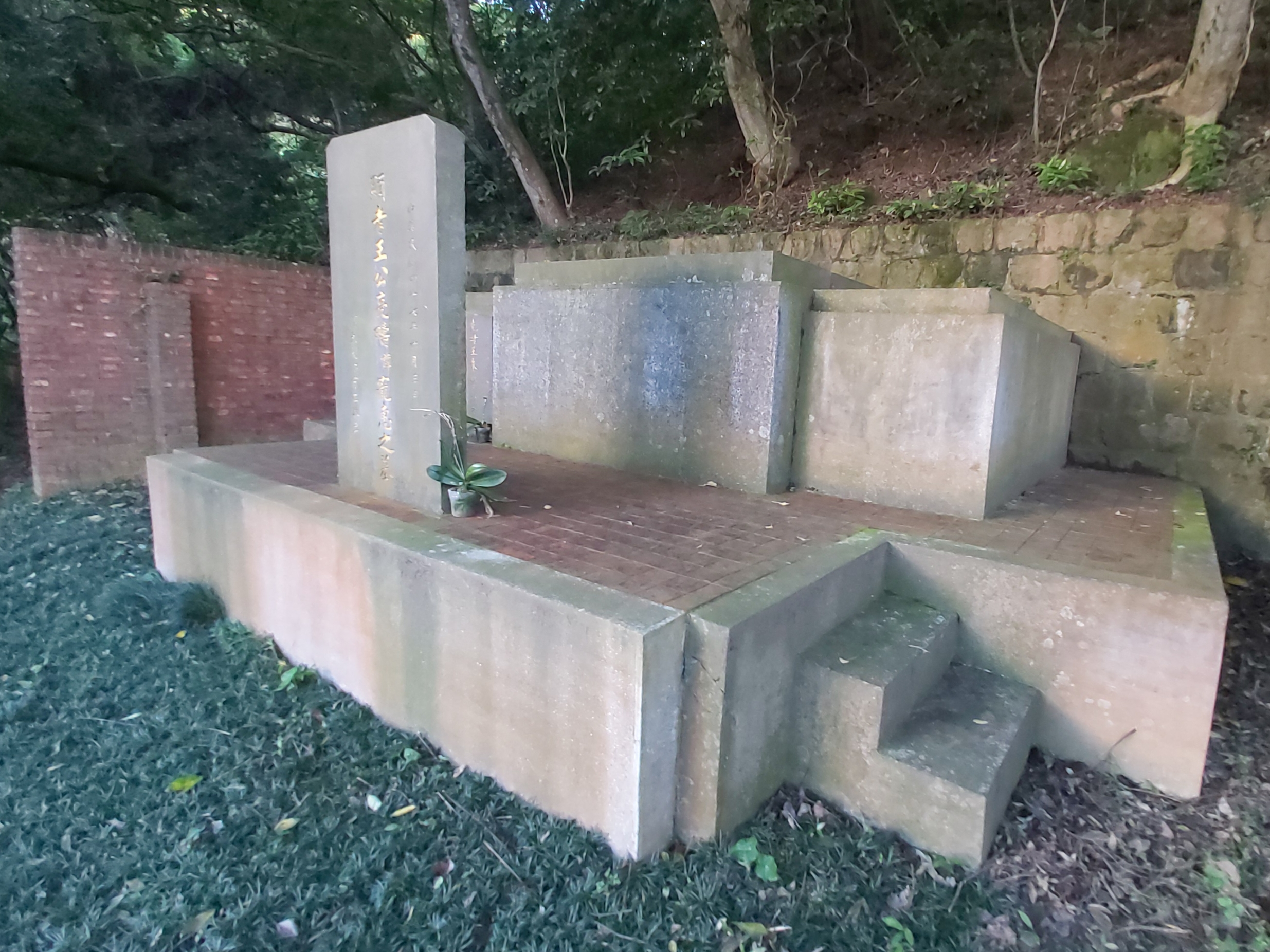
Tomb of Wang Chonghui

Dr. Wang was a member of the Chinese delegation to the United Nations in San Francisco in April 1945. Upon his return to China, he served as director of the Far Eastern Branch Committee of the Commission for the Investigation of Pacific War Crimes. Wang then worked on the framing of the constitution of the Republic of China, which was promulgated on January 1, 1947. In 1948, he was elected member of the Academia Sinica and once again became minister of justice. When mainland China fell to the Chinese Communist Party in 1949, Wang relocated to Taipei, Taiwan.

Upon his resettlement in Taiwan, Wang served on the Kuomintang's Central Reform Committee and its successor, the Central Advisory Committee. He continued to serve as president of the Judicial Yuan until his death on March 15, 1958. His son, Wang Da-hong, was an important Taiwanese architect, regarded as one of the pioneers of modernist architecture in Taiwan.

Preceded by Zhang Qun	Minister of Foreign Affairs; 1937–1941	Succeeded by Quo Tai-chi
Preceded by Yan Huiqing	Premier of China; 1922	Succeeded by Wang Daxie
