= Kwok Wing Hang v Chief Executive in Council =

Hong Kong case law concerning wearing of masks

- Court of Final Appeal
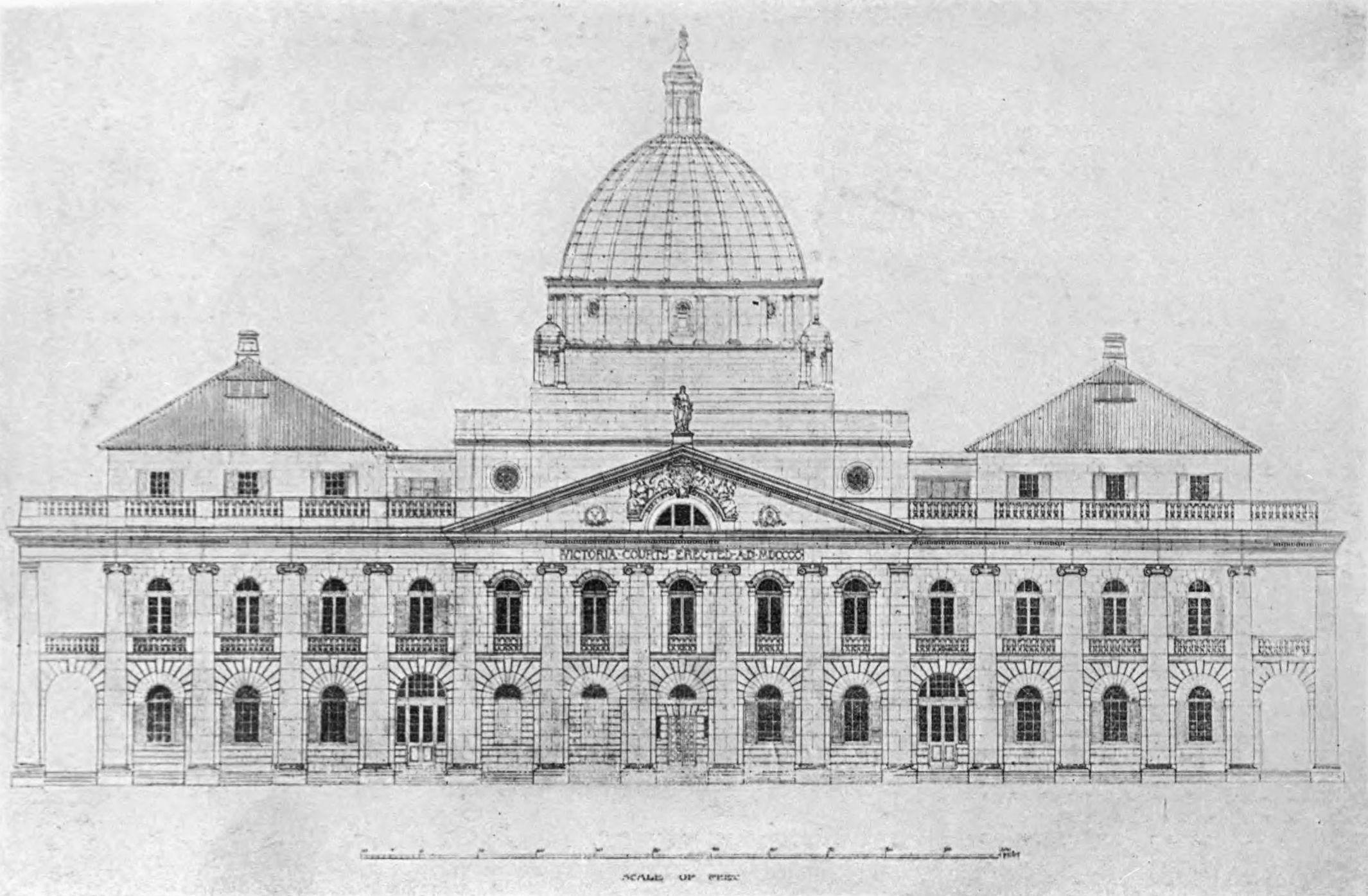
- Full case name: Kwok Wing Hang and others v Chief Executive in Council; Chief Executive in Council and another v Kwok Wing Hang and others; Leung Kwok Hung v Secretary for Justice and another
- Case numbers: FACV 6/2020, FACV 7/2020, FACV 8/2020, FACV 9/2020
- Citations: [2020] HKCFA 42

Court membership
- Judges sitting: Geoffrey Ma CJ, R A V Ribeiro PJ, Joseph Fok PJ, Andrew Cheung PJ, Lord Hoffman NPJ
- Judgment by: Geoffrey Ma CJ, R A V Ribeiro PJ, Joseph Fok PJ, Andrew Cheung PJ, Lord Hoffman NPJ

Case opinions
- The Emergency Regulations Ordinance is constitutional under the Basic Law. The Prohibition on Face Coverings Regulation was validly enacted thereunder. The prohibition on face coverings at all assemblies with and without a permit is proportional, and therefore constitutional.
- Keywords: Basic Law; Constitutional law; Emergency Regulations Ordinance; Prohibition on Face Covering Regulation; Administrative law; Chief Executive In Council; Human rights

Kwok Wing Hang and others v Chief Executive in Council and another is a Hong Kong constitutional case concerning the Prohibition on Face Covering Regulation (PFCR) and Emergency Regulations Ordinance (ERO).

== Summary ==
The Court of First Instance (CFI) ruled that the granting of powers to the Chief Executive in Council on an occasion of public danger by the ERO was unconstitutional, and, therefore, that the entirety of the PFCR was unconstitutional because it was in exercise of those powers. On separate grounds it also declared all the substantive sections of the PFCR excepting that prohibiting the use of masks at an unlawful assembly inconsistent with the Basic Law and the Bill of Rights, and therefore of no effect.

The Court of Appeal ruled that the ERO was in fact constitutional on occasions of public danger, and therefore that the PFCR was not invalid on those grounds. It additionally held that section 3(1)(b) of the PFCR, which prohibited masks at certain "unauthorised assemblies", is proportionate, and therefore valid, but upheld the decision of the CFI that the PFCR is invalid insofar as it prohibits masks at authorised assemblies and meetings.

Both parties intended to appeal to the Court of Final Appeal (CFA).

== Court of First Instance ==
The court heard two applications for judicial review, submitted in early October. The first was submitted by 24 members of the Legislative Council, and the second by Leung Kwok-hung, a former member. Four other applications were made, each of the applicants in which were instructed to await the outcome of the initial case. The court refused to grant an interim injunction. Both applications were conjoined into a single set of hearings. On 17 October, the judiciary decided that two judges should hear the case, instead of the usual one; the move was seen as indicative of the significance of the case by a number of legal experts.

The court considered 5 grounds of appeal. On Ground 1, the "delegation of legislative power ground", the Emergency Regulations Ordinance (ERO) in exercise of the powers granted by which the Chief Executive made the PFCR was an impermissible grant of legislative power that contravened the separation of powers under the Basic Law. On Ground 2, the "implied repeal ground" the ERO was repealed by implication by the Hong Kong Bill of Rights Ordinance and/or the International Covenant on Civil and Political Rights (ICCPR) as applied in Hong Kong by the Basic Law. On Ground 3, the ERO cannot empower the Chief Executive to make any regulation restricting fundamental rights under the Basic Law or Bill of Rights. On Ground 4, the "principle of legality ground", the Chief Executive acted ultra vires in that the ERO only applies to emergency situations. On Ground 5A, the "section 3 proportionality ground", section 3 of the PFCR, which prohibits the use of facial coverings, disproportionately restricts privacy, and freedom of expression and assembly; on Ground 5B, the "section 5 proportionality ground", section 5, concerning enforcement powers, is also disproportionate. The applicants were successful on Grounds 1, 5A, and 5B, but not Grounds 2, 3, and 4.

=== Ground 1: the delegation of legislative power ground ===
The applicants submitted that under the Basic Law, legislative power is exclusively vested in the Legislative Council; since the ERO would grant legislative power to the executive, it is inconsistent with the Basic Law. The government submitted that there is "nothing in the Basic Law which provides whether expressly or by implication that the LegCo cannot authorise the CEIC [Chief Executive in Council] to make regulations during an occasion of public danger or emergency", that the ERO had already twice been held to be valid, that regulations made thereunder were not intended to be permanent, and that the LegCo could apply negative vetting to such regulations.

The court declined to rule on the question of the constitutionality of the making of regulations by the Chief Executive in Council on an occasion of an emergency, and solely considered that concerning public danger. The court accepted that a distinction between "general legislative power" and the power to make "subordinate legislation". It drew such a distinction on the basis that the LegCo is "designated as the legislature" (Note: Emphasis the court's.) and that in the Chinese text of the Basic Law gives the LegCo 'functions which in Chinese is "職" in the phrase "職權"', which 'connotes...[a] 'job'". The court then determined that the character of the powers granted by the ERO was more akin to that of a general legislative power than a subsidiary one, for several reasons. First, the powers granted by the ERO seemed not so much to "leav[e] another body to devise the detailed legal norms that elaborate or put flesh on the broad matters laid down in the primary legislation" so much as to allow general legislation—thus this very regulation was the first enactment to concern face covering in Hong Kong. Second, the phrase "any regulations whatsoever" grants powers "of the widest possible nature". Third, "public danger" is inadequately defined. Fourth, the ERO grants the Chief Executive power to amend or suspend any other enactment. Fifth, the ERO permits the Chief Executive to prescribe punishments up to life imprisonment, inter alia, which exceed those envisaged by the Interpretation and General Clauses Ordinance (Cap. 1) vis à vis subsidiary legislation. Sixth, no time limit is envisaged by the ERO. Seventh, negative vetting is an inadequate safeguard given, inter alia, that its operation could be suspended by a regulation under the ERO, and that the legal effects of its application before repeal by the Legislative Council would not be undone even if negative vetting were possible.

On the fourth ground, the government submitted that such clauses are entirely permissible in other common law jurisdictions such as the United Kingdom and Australia; however, the court rejected the applicability of such a Diceyan notion of absolute parliamentary sovereignty in Hong Kong, on the basis that the Legislative Council's powers are derived from the Basic Law. Ultimately the court concluded that the ERO in allowing for the making of regulations by the Chief Executive at a time of "public danger" did so sufficiently broadly that it "seems...to create in Hong Kong a separate source of laws that are primary legislation in all but name".

The government further submitted that the ERO had been vetted for constitutionality before the handover as a "factor in favour of validity"; however, the court held that article 160 of the Basic Law provided for the subsequent discovery of unconstitutionality. The court therefore held the PFCR unconstitutional under ground 1, at least insofar as "public danger" is concerned.

=== Ground 2: the "implied repeal ground" ===
The applicants submitted that legislation could only derogate from the Bill of Rights when "the life of the nation" is at risk, but that the ERO allowed for such derogations in a larger set of circumstances, and therefore was repealed by implication. (Note: For brevity, the full argument is omitted; it may be seen in cited paragraph.) However, the court held that rights under the Bill of Rights could also be restricted when "compliant with the principle of proportionality".

=== Ground 3: the "prescribed by law ground" ===
The applicants submitted that the ERO granted such wide powers that it violated the principle of legal certainty and accessibility provided for by Article 39 of the Basic Law, by which a citizen should be able to anticipate the legal consequences, if appropriately advised, of a particular action. The court, however, held that the ERO itself was not necessarily unconstitutional under this principle, but rather that regulations made in exercise of the powers granted by it would have to meet this principle.

=== Ground 4: the "principle of legality ground" ===
The applicants submitted that a "principle of statutory construction....requires that any abrogation or restriction of fundamental rights by statute should be done unmistakably", but that the ERO does not "advert to any specific fundamental right", and so does not grant the Chief Executive power to restrict fundamental rights. Since the PFCR does affect fundamental rights, it is ultra vires the ERO.

The court, however, was of the view that Grounds 1 and 4 were in tension: in the former, the applicants "submit that....the ERO is of the widest scope, essentially conferring an unrestricted and unfettered legislative power"‚ but in the latter, they suggested that it should be construed as "not authorising....any restrict[ion] of fundamental rights"—since the court had already dealt with Ground 1, it was not necessary to rule on "an alternative ground", that is, Ground 4.

=== Ground 5A: the "section 3 proportionality ground" ===
It was common ground between the applicant and respondent that a four-step proportionality analysis should be used to determine the validity of section 3, by which the use of face coverings in certain circumstances was prohibited. The first step was the question of whether the PFCR sought to achieve a "legitimate aim"; the court accepted the submission of the government that the maintenance of law and order generally is a legitimate, and is the aim of the PFCR. The court also held that there is a rational connection between the prohibition of the use of masks and those legitimate aims, rejecting the applicant's argument that lawful gatherings would also be impeded by the PFCR on the grounds that the wearing of masks made likelier the occurrence of unlawful activity at an otherwise lawful gathering, and accepting an affidavit submitted by the government that the wearing of masks could create a psychological disposition to commit unlawful acts that would otherwise not have occurred.

However, the court held that, excepting unlawful assemblies, the restrictions would unduly affect entirely peaceful gatherings, and that in view of, inter alia, the lack of clarity concerning those merely "at" but not participating in a gathering, the "absence of....case-by-case evaluation or assessment", "the lack of robust evidence on the effectiveness of the measure", and "the importance....[of] freedom of expression,...assembly,...procession,...and demonstration", the measure was not proportionate. This being the third step of the analysis, the need for the fourth step was obviated, though the court expressed the view that it would have reached a similar conclusion had it considered the fourth step, viz., whether the PFCR would strike "a reasonable balance between the societal benefits sought to promoted and the inroads made into the aforesaid protected rights."

=== Ground 5B: the "section 5 proportionality ground" ===
A similar four-step proportionality analysis was made of section 5, which allows police officers to demand the removal of a facial covering. As above, the court held that section 5 had a legitimate aim ('law enforcement'), and was rationally connected to that aim. However, because section 5 would apply extremely broadly, "irrespective of whether there is any public meeting or procession taking place in the vicinity", and regardless of the risk of violence, section 5 could "be used by a police officer for the random stoppage of anyone found wearing a facial covering in any public place", which "exceeds what is reasonably necessary to achieve the aim of law enforcement" etc., and so is disproportionate.

=== Relief order ===
In its judgment dated 18 November 2019, the court noted that it had "not heard submissions on the question of relief"; it therefore made a decision on 22 November.

It was common ground that the PFCR should be declared invalid on the basis that the ERO did not grant the Chief Executive power to make regulations on an occasion of public danger, and that all the substantive sections of the PFCR except for the prohibition on wearing a mask at an unlawful assembly were invalid in virtue of their disproportionality.

==== Suspension or temporary validity order ====
However, the government sought an order by which the PFCR, and therefore the provisions of the ERO in use of the powers granted by which the PFCR was purported to be made should remain "valid and of legal effect" pending a further appeal. Such an order was sought on the grounds that the quashing of the PFCR would endanger public safety and the rule of law; the court was of the view, however, that those most likely to be involved in violent acts would act regardless of the validity of the PFCR, and that the court had already emphasised the importance of the rule of law. To the latter, they added that they were unable to accept that they should make such an order purely because of the risk that to fail to do so could be perceived incorrectly by some.

The government, however, alternatively sought a "suspension order", whose effect would be ensure that the government would not "openly [act] against a court's declaration". It differs from the "temporary validity order" sought above in that it would not ultimately render actions taken under impugned enactments of legal validity. The court was of the view that the continued enforcement of the PFCR would likely cause more conflict, and therefore declined to make such a suspension order on the grounds the government sought.

==== Disposition ====
The court held the ERO, insofar as "public danger" is concerned, unconstitutional, and therefore declared the PFCR invalid and of no effect. On separate grounds it also declared all the substantive sections of the PFCR excepting that prohibiting the use of masks at an unlawful assembly inconsistent with the Basic Law and the Bill of Rights, and therefore of no effect.

Notwithstanding its deliberations above, the court in view of a likely appeal to the Court of Appeal granted a temporary suspension order of seven days.

== Court of Appeal case ==
The government gave notice of its intention to appeal on 25 November 2019. On 9 April 2020, the court ruled that the ERO, insofar as occasions of public danger are concerned, is valid, and therefore that the PFCR is valid and of legal effect. It upheld the Court of First Instance's ruling on the disproportionality of the PFCR in public meetings and processions permitted by the Commissioner of Police as well as on the powers granted to police to require persons to remove face coverings, but quashed its ruling and therefore upheld the PFCR at unauthorised assemblies. Therefore, the Court of Appeal departed from the CFI's ruling in respect of Ground 1, and partially in respect of Ground 5A.

=== Ground 1: general or subordinate legislative power? ===
The court accepted the initial reasoning of the CFI concerning the criteria by which the constitutionality of the ERO on an occasion of public danger should be determined. If the ERO were to delegate power to make primary legislation, it would be unconstitutional, but if it were to delegate subordinate legislation, it would be constitutional.

Although, as the CFI noted, "public danger" is not defined by the ERO, the court was of the view that "there is nothing objectionable in itself to task the CEIC [Chief Executive in Council] to determine if an occasion of public danger exists". Since "emergency or public danger is not capable of exhaustive definition", legislation in that connection is "necessarily wide and extensive in scope", and so the broadness of the ERO was not sufficient to rule it unconstitutional. Further objections considered the norms established by the Interpretation and General Clauses Ordinance (Cap. 1.) vis à vis subordinate legislation: the CFI were of the view that the ERO envisaged regulations beyond the scope of the norms established by the IGCO, and therefore that the ERO would allow the enactment of primary legislation by the Chief Executive, but the court held that the IGCO was disapplied by implication.

In view of the above, the court rejected the application for judicial review on Ground 1.

=== Grounds 5A and 5B ===
==== Section 3(1)(b): unauthorised assembly ====
Whereas the CFI held that "an assembly which is 'unauthorized' may yet be entirely peaceful", the Court objected to the CFI's decision that section 3(1)(b), which prohibits the wearing of masks at such assemblies, would be disproportionate. First, the court reconsidered the nature of the definition of an unauthorised assembly as defined by the POO. The first scenario in which an assembly would be unauthorised would be a procession or meeting in contravention of a requirement that the Commissioner of Police should be notified and indicate no objection thereto. The construction of the POO must be "compatible with the fundamental right of demonstration and procession", and therefore in line with "the principle of tolerance and proportionality"—in other words, "there should be prior warnings" before "arrests and dispersals" etc. occur, unless there is a "serious and imminent threat risk to public order and safety" due to violence or other "reprehensible conducts [sic]". Second, such a gathering could fail to obey an order by the Commissioner of Police. A gathering would be unlikely to solely fall under this provision, since an un-notified and un-notifiable gathering of this sort would likely not be one at which the Commissioner would be present, so the former analysis applies; moreover even if it were not to, "the principle of tolerance and requirement of proportionality" also hold. The third scenario is that some direction is given to disperse or vary the route or place etc. of a gathering under section 17(2) or (3) of the POO. Again, the principle of tolerance and proportionality holds. Therefore, at all unauthorised assemblies, either some sort of violent conduct has occurred, or the police have publicly issued a warning and order under section 17(3) of the POO. Moreover a person must be aware of the order to refuse or willfully neglect to obey it, and cannot knowingly take part in an unauthorised assembly unless aware that it was unauthorised. The court therefore held that the CFI had envisaged a highly improbable scenario in deciding that the prohibition on the wearing of masks at an entirely orderly assembly was implied by section 3(1)(b) of the PFCR.

The court summarised its reasoning in 12 steps.

1. The PFCR is enacted in exercise of the powers granted to the Chief Executive under the ERO in response to a public danger arising from the 2019–20 Hong Kong protests, and its repeal would be "expected" on the subsiding of that danger.
2. The wearing of masks contributes to that public danger.
3. Section 3(1)(b) prohibits facial coverings only at unauthorised assemblies. It does not prevent the wearing of masks at authorised gatherings held in compliance with conditions imposed by the police.
4. The wearing of facial coverings is, however, only prohibited when a person remains at an unauthorised assembly after an order is made to disperse, or if violent conduct were to occur threatening public safety.
5. Section 4 provides a defence on the basis of a "reasonable excuse", e.g., that there was no "reasonable opportunity to leave the scene".
6. Refusal to disperse is itself an unlawful act.
7. Even if those refusing to disperse do so in exercise of a right to peaceful demonstration, facial coverings are not "at the core of such right [sic]".
8. An order to disperse would only be made where refusal to disperse would create a risk of a breach of the peace, especially in view of "black block tactics".
9. Wearing of facial coverings impedes law enforcement by preventing identification and segregation of violent protesters.
10. It also endangers the right of peaceful demonstration by precluding certain less intrusive police action.
11. Therefore, the maintenance of law and order itself is necessary to preserve the right of assembly.
12. Therefore, safeguards both from common law principles outlined above and the judiciary should "prevent arbitrariness in the exercise of discretion by the police".

In conclusion, it held that the prohibition on the use of masks at unauthorised assemblies is constitutional.

==== Sections 3(1)(c) and (d) and section 5: authorised assemblies and meetings, and power to remove masks ====
The court was of the view that the prohibition of the use of masks at "peaceful and orderly" events "is difficult to see"; in the event of "black bloc tactics" such an event would then quickly become "an unauthorized assembly or unlawful assembly", in which the prohibition would then apply. The court therefore agreed with the CFI that the prohibition of the wearing of face coverings at authorised assemblies and meetings was therefore disproportionate. It also agreed with the CFI on the disproportionality of section 5 granting the police powers to remove face masks and making refusal an offence.

== Court of Final Appeal ==
After the Court of Appeal made its ruling, the applicants in the CFI case said that they would appeal to the Court of Final Appeal. The South China Morning Post later revealed that both parties intended to appeal. If the appeal is to be heard by the Court of Final Appeal, leave must either be obtained from the Court of Appeal, or directly from the Court of Final Appeal. On 10 July, the South China Morning Post reported that the Court of Appeal had granted permission to both sides to appeal to the Court of Final Appeal on ten questions of law deemed to be of "great general or public importance".

== Reaction ==
=== Court of First Instance ruling ===
The central government immediately criticised the Court of First Instance's ruling, causing concern for the independence of Hong Kong's judiciary.

Henry Litton, a former judge of the Court of Final Appeal, strongly criticised the judgment. In an article in the South China Morning Post, Litton called the court's approach "startling". Litton argued that, because before the handover all laws were "scrutinised", but the ERO "stood intact", it could not be unconstitutional. He also criticised the court's citation of overseas cases, and suggested that Henry VIII clauses could have no relevance to Hong Kong because he "died in 1547". He further suggested that the first set of applicants, being 24 members of the Legislative Council, had "no rights or interests in the enactment of the face-mask regulation greater than anyone else".

In response, the government said that it would stop enforcing the ban for the time being. A spokesman from the Chinese legislative affairs commission, however, stated that "Whether the laws of the Hong Kong Special Administrative Region comply with the Basic Law of Hong Kong can only be judged and decided by the standing committee of the National People's Congress".

=== Court of Appeal ruling ===
A commentary in the state-run China Daily said that the Court of Appeal's partial allowing of the government's appeal "strengthens the rule of law", though criticised it for allowing those at permitted assemblies to wear masks.

== See also ==
- Prohibition on Face Covering Regulation (PFCR)
- Emergency Regulations Ordinance (ERO)
- Public Order Ordinance (POO)
