= 2020 in Hong Kong =

- Decades: 2000s; 2010s; 2020s
- See also: Other events of 2020; History of Hong Kong • Timeline • Years

The following events occurred in Hong Kong in the year 2020.

== Incumbents ==
=== Executive branch ===
- Chief Executive: Carrie Lam
  - Chief Secretary for Administration: Matthew Cheung
  - Financial Secretary: Paul Mo-po Chan
  - Secretary for Justice: Teresa Cheng

=== Legislative branch ===
- President of the Legislative Council: Andrew Leung

=== Judicial branch ===
- Chief Justice of the Court of Final Appeal: Geoffrey Ma

== Events ==
=== January ===
- 1 January – 2019–20 Hong Kong protests: Protesters take part in the annual new year day march with organisers claiming that over one million people took part.
- 5 January – Thousands of protesters march in the Sheung Shui neighbourhood, leading to dozens of arrests.

=== February ===
- 9 February – Thousands of passengers leave cruise ship after being quarantined for days.

=== March ===
- 24 March – Andrew Cheung appointed as Chief Justice of the CFA when Geoffrey Ma retires on 11 January 2021.

=== April ===
- 9 April – A court ruled that it is okay to prohibit face covering at certain "unauthorised assemblies". On the other hand, it is legal to wear masks in permitted assemblies.

=== May ===
- 8 May – The ban on gathering of more than 4 people relaxes to 8 people.
- 15 May – The Independent Police Complaints Council exonerates the police.
- 27 May
  - The Chinese National People's Congress votes in favour of national security legislation that criminalizes "secession," "subversion," "terrorism," and foreign interference in Hong Kong; the legislation grants sweeping powers to the Chinese central government to suppress the Hong Kong democracy movement, including by banning activist groups and curtailing civil liberties. The U.S. government responds by declaring Hong Kong is "no longer autonomous" under the United States-Hong Kong Policy Act.
  - After being closed for months, schools resume classes.

=== June ===
- 4 June – Legislative council passes the National Anthem Ordinance.
- 19 June – The ban on gathering of more than 8 people relaxes to 50 people.
- 30 June – China passes the Hong Kong national security law.

=== July ===
- 7 July – Implementation Rules for Article 43 of the Law of the People's Republic of China on Safeguarding National Security in the Hong Kong Special Administrative Region effective.
- 8 July – Office for Safeguarding National Security of the CPG in the HKSAR Opened in Causeway Bay.
- 9 July – Hong Kong Legislative Council passed the bill to extend maternity leave from 10 weeks to 14 weeks.
- 14 July – The United States government passes the Hong Kong Autonomy Act.
- 15 July – The ban on gathering tightens to 4 people. Eating in restaurants from 6 pm to 5 am banned.
- 29 July – Eating in restaurants totally banned, but that lasted for 2 days only. The ban on gathering tightens to 2 people.
- 31 July – Eating in restaurants from 5 am to 6 pm allowed.

=== August ===
- 12 August – The police releases Jimmy Lai on bail, Lai was arrested on 10 August.
- 23 August - Twelve Hong Kong people who were allegedly in China's territorial waters and trying to flee to Taiwan were detained by mainland authorities and denied access to their families and their appointed legal counsel. They are accused of "separatism" due their involvement in pro-democracy protests.
- 28 August – Eating in restaurants allowed until 9pm (extended 3 hours).

=== September ===
- 4 September – Eating in restaurants allowed until 10 pm (extended 1 hour).
- 18 September – Eating in restaurants allowed until 12 am (extended 2 hours).
- 27 September – The Central Military Dock officially hand over to People's Liberation Army Hong Kong Garrison.
- 27 September - The Sheung Shui to Yuen Long cycling track officially opens.

=== October ===
- 6 October - Hong Kong Government disqualified a primary school teacher for promoting "independence movement".

=== November ===
- 11 November - China Standing Committee of the National People's Congress issued a decision order to disqualify four Hong Kong legislators.
- 12 November - In response to four lawmakers disqualification, Hong Kong pro-democracy lawmakers resign en masse.
- 26 November - An emergency alert system is launched to disseminate emergency messages to mobile users.

=== December ===
- 1 December - The digital switchover is completed and the transmission of analogue television ceases. The signals are shut on the same day.
- 11 December - The Open University of Hong Kong officially applied for rename its university name to Hong Kong Metropolitan University.
- 12 December - Jimmy Lai, the CEO of the famous local newspaper Apple Daily, is arrested due to the Hong Kong National Security Law.
- 21 December - The Hong Kong Final Court of Appeal rules the Emergency Regulations Ordinance and the Prohibition on Face Covering Regulation Constitutional.
- 27 December - The Tuen Mun–Chek Lap Kok Link officially opens.
- 30 December - The Hong Kong Government officially launched the new electronic identity Mobile Apps named "iAM Smart".
- 31 December - Hong Kong Correctional Services Department celebrate its 100th anniversary.

== Deaths ==
- 15 May – Allen Lee, former member of the Executive Council and the legislative council, founding chairman of Liberal Party (b. 1940).
- 26 May – Stanley Ho, casino owner (b. 1921).
- 23 August – Benny Chan, film director (b. 1961).

== See also ==
- List of Hong Kong films of 2020
