= Emergency (Exemption from Statutory Requirements) (COVID-19) Regulation =

Legislation of Hong Kong

Chief Executive in Council
- Citation: Cap. 241N
- Territorial extent: Hong Kong
- Enacted by: Chief Executive in Council
- Enacted: 24 February 2022
- Commenced: 24 February 2022

Related legislation
- Emergency Regulations Ordinance
- Status: In force

The Emergency (Exemption from Statutory Requirements) (COVID-19) Regulation (Cap. 241N) is an emergency regulation made by the Chief Executive of Hong Kong under the Emergency Regulations Ordinance in the midst of the fifth wave of COVID-19 pandemic, authorising exemptions to Chinese workers, medics, projects, materials in order to contain the spread of virus.

== Background ==
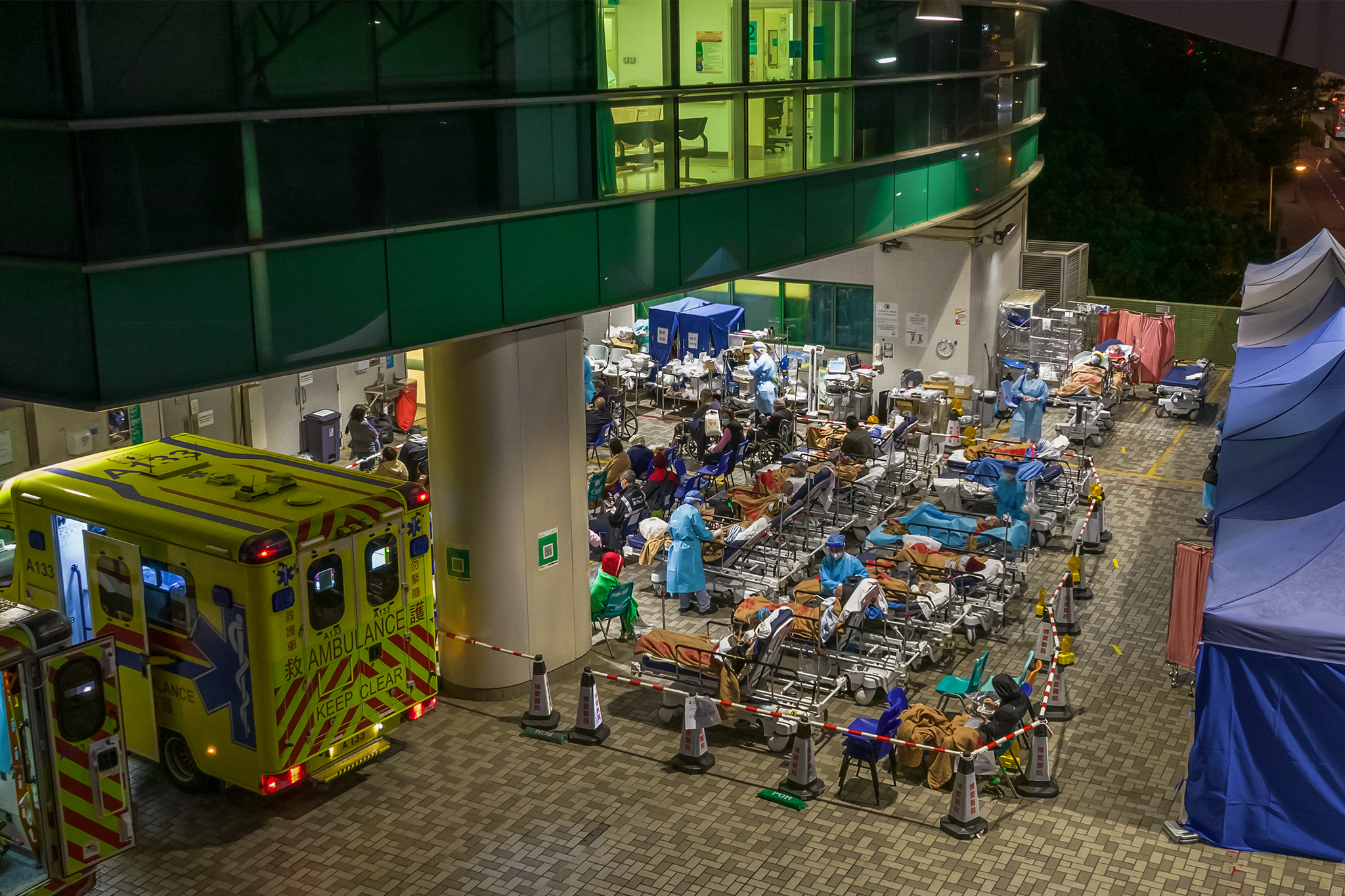
Hospitals overwhelmed by COVID patients

Hong Kong experienced the fifth wave of COVID-19 pandemic starting from early 2022, after the first Omicron variant cluster was found in the community. The fifth wave became the worst to hit Hong Kong since the pandemic began, and the number of cases escalated exponentially.

On 16 February 2022, Xi Jinping, General Secretary of the Chinese Communist Party, ordered to halt COVID surge by all means according to the state-backed Hong Kong media, a usual directive from the Chinese Government. Pro-Beijing MPs soon urged the Hong Kong Government to trigger the emergency law.

On 23 February, the Chief Executive-in-Council, citing a "very dire" epidemic situation, decided to enact the Regulation to provide the legal basis for the Government to implement the anti-epidemic measures supported by the Chinese Government, including the construction of hospitals and isolation facilities. The Regulation came into effect on the next day. This is the fourth time Chief Executive Carrie Lam used her emergency power to make laws bypassing the Legislative Council.

== Provisions ==
The Regulation empowers the Chief Secretary for Administration to grant exemption to persons or projects such that legal requirements are not needed to be complied with, in order to prevent the spread of virus and swiftly contain the fifth wave, such that the Hong Kong Government may draw on support and resources from China in a "flexible and prompt" manner.

For preventing, protecting against, delaying or otherwise controlling the incidence or transmission of the specified disease or treating patients with the specified disease (specified purposes), the Chief Secretary for Administration (Chief Secretary) may, having regard to the factors set out in subsection (2), grant an exemption in writing from any requirement under any enactment (including a requirement for licence, authority, approval, exemption, permit, registration, standard or specification).

— Section 2(1) of Emergency (Exemption from Statutory Requirements) (COVID-19) Regulation

== Implementation ==
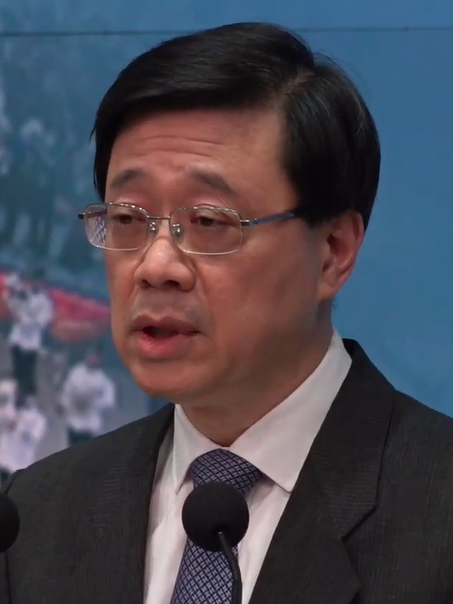
John Lee, Chief Secretary for Administration, gave exemptions to Chinese workers and projects

As of April, four exemptions were granted by John Lee under the Regulation.

On 4 March, the Government announced that John Lee, the Chief Secretary, exercised his authority to exempt projects, personnel and materials within the fenced-off works site in Lok Ma Chau Loop, where community isolation and treatment facilities were built. Temporary bridges connecting Lok Ma Chau Loop and Shenzhen was built in order for faster conveyance. This is the first time a cross-boundary crossing was constructed without formal border control. Local media also reported that the construction of the temporary bridge finished before the announcement of granting exemption, raising concerns of illegal construction.

On 11 March, the Government confirmed mainland Chinese trucks have been bringing in COVID-related medical goods and food supplies to “ensure smooth cross-boundary land transport”, but local licence plates were not seen on the trucks. Carrie Lam said on 14 March she had authorised John Lee to grant exemptions under the emergency regulations for the unlicensed vehicles. Lam declined to comment on the responsibility should any accidents occur, but said the most important question to ask was: "who are these cross-border mainland lorries here in Hong Kong for?"

Medical teams from China were also granted exemption to treat the COVID patients without following statutory requirements. When asked about the responsibility of possible incidents caused by the Chinese medics, Lam did not directly address the issue. The Hospital Authority later confirmed the authorities will bear the "ultimate responsibility", after the medical workers were employed as "honorary staff". Exemption were granted to allow operators of Residential Care Homes for the Elderly to use other premises to take care of elders.

On 2 April, John Lee granted permission to Chief Executive Election candidates to conduct election-related gatherings with members of the Election Committee and the public, due to the "exceptional circumstances of the case" and as such "serves the public interest", although only 1,200-member Election Committee can vote for the Chief Executive. Lee resigned on 6 April and later became the sole candidate of the election. Concerns raised on the possible conflict of interest as Lee could have exempted himself when he had decided to run for the leadership.
