= List of Hong Kong films of 2020 =

A list of Hong Kong films released in 2020:

Opening		Title	Director	Cast	Ref.
J A N	22	The Grand Grandmaster	Dayo Wong	Dayo Wong, Annie Liu, Hui Shiu-hung	
J A N	23	Enter the Fat Dragon	Kenji Tanigaki	Donnie Yen, Teresa Mo, Niki Chow	
J A N	24	All's Well, Ends Well 2020	Raymond Wong Pak-ming	Julian Cheung, Raymond Wong Pak-ming, Louis Cheung	
J A N	24	You Are the One	Patrick Kong	Carlos Chan, Gladys Li	
F E B	22	The Secret Diary of a Mom to Be	Luk Yee-sum	Dada Chan, Kevin Chu, Venus Wong, Louis Cheung	
F E B	24	Nights of a Shemale A Mad Man Trilogy 1/3	Dennis Law	Lam Sheung, Koyi Mak, Ernesto De Sousa	
M A Y	28	The Fallen	Cheuk Pan Lee	Alice Chan, Eddie Chan, Hanna Chan	
M A Y	28	Suk Suk	Ray Yeung	Tai Bo, Ben Yuen, Patra Au	
J U N	4	Unleashed	Ambrose Kwok, Ka Hei Kwok	Ken Lo, Venus Wong, Chui Tien-you, Samm Lee	
J U N	11	My Prince Edward	Norris Wong	Stephy Tang, Chu Pak Hong	
J U N	18	Lost and Found in Tokyo	Charlie Choi	Michelle Wai, Danson Tang, Lawrence Chou	
J U N	25	Declared Legally Dead	Steve Yuen Kim Wai	Anthony Wong, Karena Lam, Kathy Yuen, Liu Kai-chi, Stephen Au, Carlos Chan, Joey Tang, Alice Fung So-bor	
J U L	2	Beyond the Dream	Kiwi Chow	Cecilia Choi, Terrance Lau	
J U L	2	Midlight Lila			
A U G	17	I'm Livin' It	Danny Wong	Aaron Kwok, Miriam Yeung, Alex Man, Cheung Tat-ming, Zeno Koo	
A U G	25	Fatal Vist	Calvin Poon Yuen Leung	Sammi Cheng, Charlene Choi, Tong Dawei	
O C T	8	Hell Bank Presents: Running Ghost	Mark Lee	Wong You Nam, Cecilia So, Jerry Lamb, Zeno Koo, Ben Yuen, ERROR	
N O V	5	No.7 Cherry Lane	Yonfan		
N O V	19	The Infernal Walker	Ally Wong	Michael Tse, Pakho Chau, Shiga Lin, Ray Lui	
N O V	19	Memories to Choke On, Drinks to Wash Them Down	Leung Ming Kai, Kate Reilly		
N O V	26	Find Your Voice	Adrian Kwan	Andy Lau, Lowell Lo, Martin Wong	
N O V	26	The Calling of A Bus Driver	Patrick Kong	Ivana Wong	

== See also ==
- 2020 in Hong Kong
