= Kenji Fan =

Hong Kong actor, model and singer (born 2002)

- 范麒智
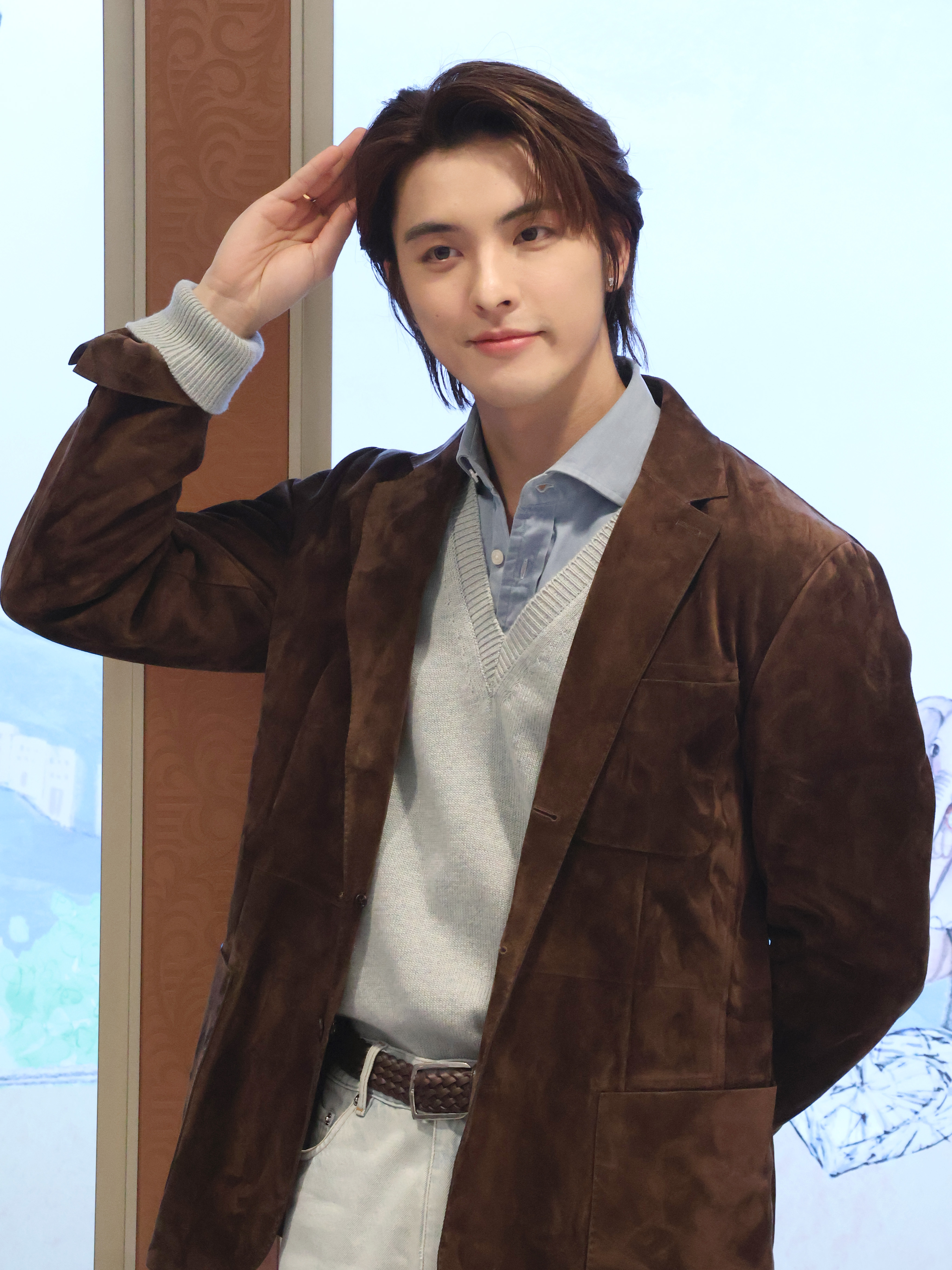
- Fan in April 2025
- Born: Fan Ki Chi; 21 August 2002 (age 24); Hong Kong
- Education: La Salle College
- Occupations: Model; actor
- Years active: 2021–present
- Notable work: The Promise of the Soul; Taste Hunter
- Father: Fan Chun Yip

Kenji Fan (Chinese: 范麒智; born 21 August 2002) is a Hong Kong fashion model, actor and singer. He was a former water polo player for the Hong Kong water polo team. He is the son of former professional footballer Fan Chun Yip. His first film is My First of May starring Aaron Kwok. He is known for starring in the series The Promise of the Soul, as well as for hosting Taste Hunter and Brain Fog Research.

== Career ==
=== Modelling ===
Fan began modelling professionally in 2020 and has appeared on covers for MRRM, Ming Watch, Marie Claire Hong Kong and Wildcard. He has appeared in editorials for men's uno Hong Kong, Vogue Man Hong Kong, Vogue Hong Kong, Esquire Hong Kong, #legend, GQ Taiwan and Elle Men Hong Kong.

=== Collaborations with Martin Wong ===
He became known for his collaborations with actor Martin Wong. They have appeared together in fashion magazines since 2022. Their first appearance together on TV was on the cooking show Supper on Time (2023) Episode 107 on ViuTV. After a month, the food travel show Taste Hunter which they hosted was aired on ViuTV; netizens hope they shoot a BL series in the future. In the television series Margaret & David Tie (2024) Episode 9, Martin acted opposite Kenji for the first time but it only had a few minutes. Martin was a guest (Episode 7) on Kenji’s game show Brain Fog Research (2024). On August 30, 2024, they held their first fan meeting event in Hong Kong. On October 17, 2024, they appeared on Zip magazine cover. In 2025, their collaboration in the BL series as main leads, The Promise of the Soul was shown on SET Metro and several streaming platforms. They sang two songs, "You’re the One I Can’t Live Without" and "Freeze" for the drama. They participated in several fan meeting events in Taiwan. On February 14, 2026, they held their second fan meeting event in Hong Kong.

== Filmography ==
=== Film ===
| Year | Title | Role | Notes/Ref. |
|---|---|---|---|
| 2024 | Love at First Lie | Mark | Cameo |
| 2025 | My First of May | Hanson Cheung | Supporting role |
| 2025 | Good Game | Uno | Cameo |
| TBA | Nemesis in the Dark | | |

=== Television ===
| Year | Title | Network | Role | Notes/Ref. |
|---|---|---|---|---|
| 2022 | I SWIM | ViuTV | Yip Tim Chaam | Cameo |
| 2024 | Margaret & David Tie | ViuTV | Swimming team captain | Ep.9, Cameo |
| 2025 | The Promise of the Soul | SET Metro | Ye Haiyuan | Main role |
| 2026 | Under the Rainbow | ViuTV | Eddie | Ep.5-6, Cameo |

=== Variety show ===
| Year | Title | Network | Notes/Ref. |
|---|---|---|---|
| 2023 | University Keywords | ViuTV | Host |
| 2023 | Taste Hunter | ViuTV | Host |
| 2024 | Brain Fog Research | ViuTV | Host |

=== Music video appearances ===
| Year | Title | Artist | Notes/Ref. |
|---|---|---|---|
| 2022 | Who Invented the Encore? | Terence Lam | |
| 2022 | 5 Ciphers of Love | Lolly Talk | |
| 2022 | On Ur Way | Yika | |
| 2024 | Show Me Your Love on a Sunny Day | Cath Wong | |
| 2025 | Wait A Second | Day | |

== Discography ==
=== Singles ===
==== Collaborations ====
| Year | Title | Album | Notes/Ref. |
|---|---|---|---|
| 2025 | "You're the One I Can't Live Without" (換不了的你) (with Martin Wong) | —N/a | The Promise of the Soul OST (Theme Song) |
| 2025 | "Freeze" (定格) (with Martin Wong) | —N/a | The Promise of the Soul OST |

== Modelling ==
=== Magazine ===
| Year | Magazine | Issue | Collaboration | Content | Notes/Ref. |
|---|---|---|---|---|---|
| 2022 | men's uno Hong Kong | February | —N/a | Editorial | |
| 2022 | MRRM | February | Martin Wong | Editorial | |
| 2022 | MRRM | March | Martin Wong | Editorial | |
| 2022 | Vogue Man Hong Kong | March | —N/a | Editorial | |
| 2022 | MING WATCH | April | —N/a | Cover, Editorial | |
| 2022 | MRRM | May | —N/a | Cover, Editorial | |
| 2022 | men's uno Hong Kong | August | —N/a | Editorial | |
| 2022 | Vogue Hong Kong | September | —N/a | Editorial | |
| 2022 | Vogue Man Hong Kong | September | Martin Wong, Matthew Han | Editorial | |
| 2022 | Esquire Hong Kong | September | Martin Wong | Editorial | |
| 2022 | Marie Claire Hong Kong | October | Will Or, Hedwig Tam, Cecilia Yeung Man-wai | Cover, Editorial | |
| 2024 | #legend | January | —N/a | Editorial | |
| 2024 | GQ Taiwan | May | Martin Wong | Editorial | |
| 2024 | Zip | October | Martin Wong | Cover, Editorial | |
| 2025 | Elle Men Hong Kong | August | Martin Wong | Editorial | |
| 2025 | MRRM | September | —N/a | Editorial | |
| 2026 | Wildcard Hong Kong | First Issue | —N/a | Cover, Editorial | |

== Live performance ==
=== Fanmeeting ===
| Year | Date | Name | Collaboration | City | Venue | Notes/Ref. |
|---|---|---|---|---|---|---|
| 2024 | 30 August | Kenji Fan & Martin Wong - 1st Fans Meeting | Martin Wong | Hong Kong | Wavy Bar and Restaurant | |
| 2025 | 28 September | "The Promise of the Soul" Fanmeeting in Taipei | Martin Wong, Wei Hung, Din Lee, Yaron Qiu | Taipei | Sanlih E-Television Theatre | |
| 2025 | 30 November | "Every Fantasy Possible" Fancon in Taipei | Martin Wong, Kevin Chang, Eden Chen, Lawrence Lo, Sing Hom, Andy Ko, Nelson Ji, Wei Hung and Din Lee | Taipei | Westar | |
| 2026 | 14 February | Kenji & Martin Fan Meeting 2026 in Hong Kong | Martin Wong | Hong Kong | The Wave | |
