= CEIC =

CEIC may refer to:

- CEIC, a subsidiary of Caixin providing business information
- Central European International Cup, an international football competition held between 1927 and 1960
- Chief Executive in Council, a term in Hong Kong law
