= Martin Wong (actor) =

Hong Kong actor, model and singer (born 1997)

- 王智騫
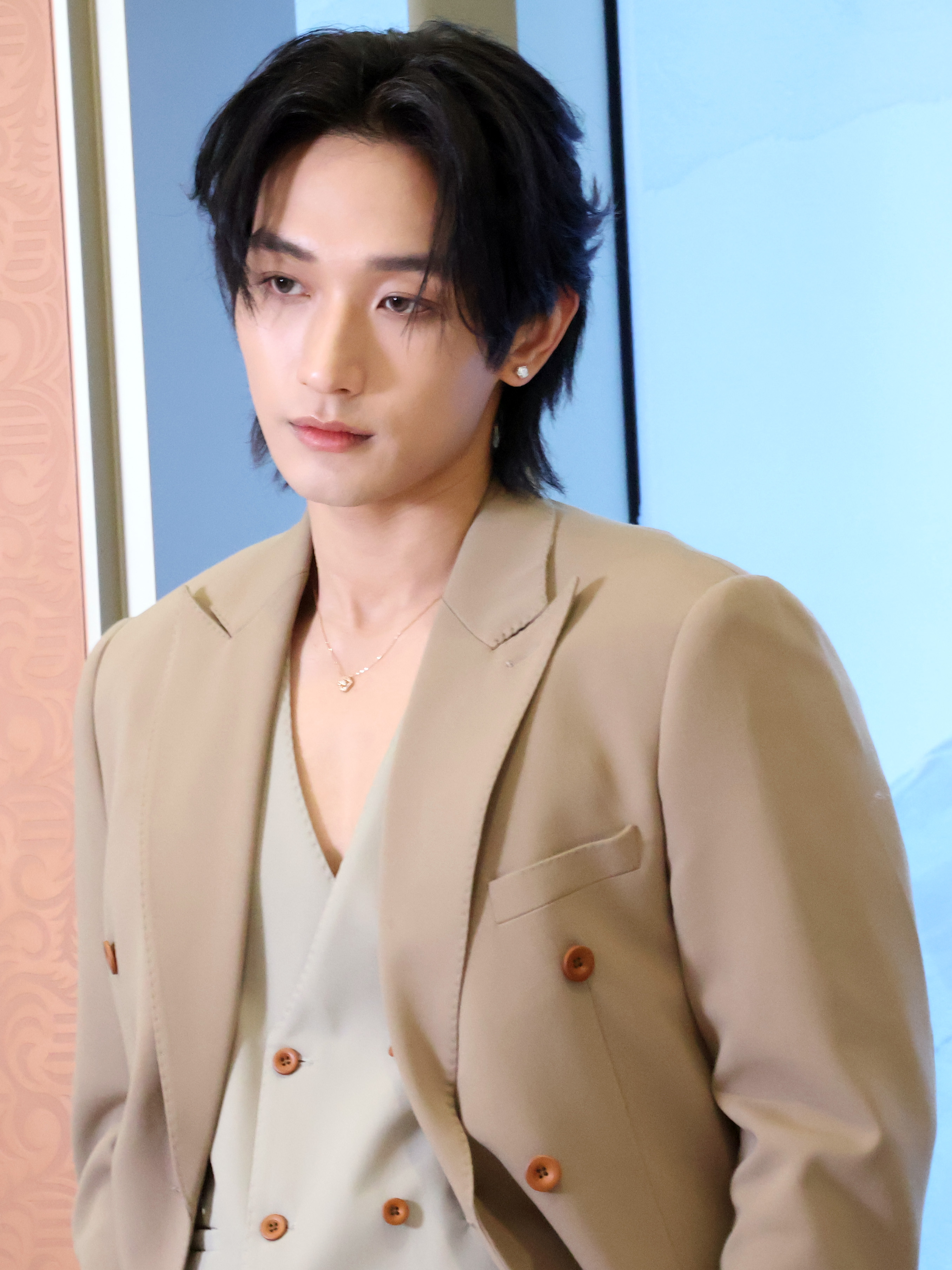
- Wong in April 2025
- Born: Wong Chi Hin; 22 March 1997 (age 29); Hong Kong
- Education: CCC Yenching College; Hong Kong Design Institute
- Occupations: Model; actor
- Years active: 2017–present
- Notable work: The Promise of the Soul; Find Your Voice; Taste Hunter; I SWIM; SPARKS

Martin Wong (Chinese: 王智騫; born 22 March 1997) is a Hong Kong actor, model and singer. He made his film debut in Find Your Voice (2020), playing Fung Shun Hei alongside Andy Lau. The same year, he starred in the HMVOD and Netflix series A Perfect Day for Arsenide . He has since appeared in ViuTV series such as I SWIM (2022), SPARKS (2023), and Margaret & David Tie (2024). In 2025, he starred as the lead in the BL series The Promise of the Soul, which aired on SET Metro and iQIYI.

== Career ==
=== Modelling ===
Wong began modelling professionally in 2015 and has appeared in TV commercials for Garden (2015), Vitasoy (2015) and Mannings (2016).

From 2022, he has appeared in editorials for Vogue Hong Kong, MRRM, Esquire Hong Kong, Elle Men Hong Kong, Marie Claire Hong Kong, Vogue Man Hong Kong and GQ Taiwan.

=== Collaborations with Kenji Fan ===
He became known for his collaborations with actor Kenji Fan. They have appeared together in fashion magazines since 2022. Their first appearance together on TV was on the cooking show Supper on Time (2023) Episode 107 on ViuTV. After a month, the food travel show Taste Hunter which they hosted was aired on ViuTV; netizens hope they shoot a BL series in the future. In the television series Margaret & David Tie (2024) Episode 9, Martin acted opposite Kenji for the first time but it only had a few minutes. Martin was a guest (Episode 7) on Kenji’s game show Brain Fog Research (2024). On August 30, 2024, they held their first fan meeting event in Hong Kong. On October 17, 2024, they appeared on Zip magazine cover. In 2025, their collaboration in the BL series as main leads, The Promise of the Soul was shown on SET Metro and several streaming platforms. They sang two songs, "You’re the One I Can’t Live Without" and "Freeze" for the drama. They participated in several fan meeting events in Taiwan. On February 14, 2026, they held their second fan meeting event in Hong Kong.

== Filmography ==
=== Film ===
Year	Title	Role	Notes/Ref.
2020	Find Your Voice	Fung Shun Hei	Supporting role

=== Television ===
Year	Title	Network	Role	Notes/Ref.
2020	A Perfect Day for Arsenide	HMVOD, Netflix	Cheung Lok	Ep.2, Main role
2022	I SWIM	ViuTV	Ah Fan	Supporting role
2023	SPARKS	ViuTV	JY	Supporting role
2024	Margaret & David Tie	ViuTV	Felix	Supporting role
2025	Games of Two Halves	ViuTV	Kim Jai	Supporting role
2025	The Promise of the Soul	SET Metro	Xia Cha / Xia Zefang	Main role

=== Variety show ===
Year	Title	Network	Notes/Ref.
2023	Taste Hunter	ViuTV	Host

=== Music video appearances ===
Year	Title	Artist	Notes/Ref.
2017	Behave Oneself	Vivian Koo	
2022	Life Resumed	Aiden Hung	
2023	Những Lời Hứa Bỏ Quên	VŨ.	

== Discography ==
=== Singles ===
==== Collaborations ====
Year	Title	Album	Notes/Ref.
2025	"You're the One I Can't Live Without" (換不了的你) (with Kenji Fan)	—N/a	The Promise of the Soul OST (Theme Song)
2025	"Freeze" (定格) (with Kenji Fan)	—N/a	The Promise of the Soul OST

=== Lyricist ===
- "Freeze" by Martin Wong and Kenji Fan (2025)

== Modelling ==
=== Magazine ===
Year	Magazine	Issue	Collaboration	Content	Notes
2022	Vogue Hong Kong	January	—N/a	Editorial	
2022	MRRM	February	Kenji Fan	Editorial	
2022	MRRM	March	Kenji Fan	Editorial	
2022	Esquire Hong Kong	April	—N/a	Cover, Editorial	
2022	Elle Men Hong Kong	July	—N/a	Editorial	
2022	Marie Claire Hong Kong	October	—N/a	Editorial	
2022	Vogue Man Hong Kong	September	Kenji Fan, Matthew Han	Editorial	
2022	Esquire Hong Kong	September	Kenji Fan	Editorial	
2024	GQ Taiwan	May	Kenji Fan	Editorial	
2024	Zip	October	Kenji Fan	Cover, Editorial	
2025	Elle Men Hong Kong	August	Kenji Fan	Editorial	

== Live performance ==
=== Fanmeeting ===
Year	Date	Name	Collaboration	City	Venue	Notes/Ref.
2024	30 August	Kenji Fan & Martin Wong - 1st Fans Meeting	Kenji Fan	Hong Kong	Wavy Bar and Restaurant	
2025	28 September	"The Promise of the Soul" Fanmeeting in Taipei	Kenji Fan, Wei Hung, Din Lee, Yaron Qiu	Taipei	Sanlih E-Television Theatre	
2025	30 November	"Every Fantasy Possible" Fancon in Taipei	Kenji Fan, Kevin Chang, Eden Chen, Lawrence Lo, Sing Hom, Andy Ko, Nelson Ji, Wei Hung and Din Lee	Taipei	Westar	
2026	14 February	Kenji & Martin Fan Meeting 2026 in Hong Kong	Kenji Fan	Hong Kong	The Wave	

== Awards and nominations ==
Year	Award	Category	Work	Result	Ref.
2023	Cloudbreakr - Influence Award 2022	Content Creator（Fashion & Beauty）	—N/a	Won	
