= The Promise of the Soul =

2025 Taiwanese television series

Chinese name
- Traditional Chinese: 靈魂約定
Transcriptions
Standard Mandarin
- Hanyu Pinyin: líng hún yuē dìng
Yue: Cantonese
- Jyutping: ling4 wan4 joek3 ding6
- Genre: Romantic drama; Boys' love; Fantasy; Comedy
- Written by: Joe Tsai
- Directed by: Joe Tsai
- Starring: Martin Wong; Kenji Fan
- Country of origin: Taiwan
- Original languages: Mandarin; Cantonese
- No. of seasons: 1
- No. of episodes: 12

Production
- Running time: 25–30 minutes
- Production company: VBL Series

Original release
- Network: SET Metro; VBL Series YouTube Channel; GTV Drama; GagaOOLala; iQIYI; Rakuten TV
- Release: June 27 – September 5, 2025

The Promise of the Soul (Chinese: 靈魂約定) is a 2025 Taiwanese boys' love television series produced by VBL Series. It stars Martin Wong and Kenji Fan in the lead roles and premiered on June 27, 2025. The series was broadcast on SET Metro, and is available for streaming on VBL Series official YouTube channel, GTV Drama Youtube channel, iQIYI, GagaOOLala and Rakuten TV.

== Synopsis ==
After a life-altering accident, Xia Cha finds himself inhabiting the body of his grandson, Xia Zefang. With his family gone and only memories left behind, he decides to continue his grandson’s daily life, attending college and sharing a dorm with Ye Haiyuan. As the two navigate their new reality, they begin to uncover a deeper connection that transcends time, identity, and the boundaries of love.

== Cast ==
=== Main ===
- Martin Wong as Xia Cha / Xia Zefang
- Kenji Fan as Ye Haiyuan

=== Supporting ===
- Yaron Qiu as Guan Ri Qing
- Din Lee as Chen Qian Sui
- Wei Hung as Jiang Bai Ling
- Kelly Liao as Haru
- Mariko Okubo as Hana
- Nelson Ji as Bai Zhou Qi / "Xiao Bai"

=== Guest ===
- Huang Hao Yung as Xia Cha (elder version) (Ep. 1, 12)
- Andy Ko as Hei Yu Bo / "Da Hei" (Ep. 11)
- Joe Tsai as Teacher Qiao (Ep. 4, 9)

== Music ==
Track listing

No.	Title	Performer	Length
1.	"You’re the one I can’t live without (Opening Theme)"	Martin Wong & Kenji Fan	3:06
2.	"You, the Answer (Ending Theme)"	Ray Huang	2:41
3.	"Freeze"	Martin Wong & Kenji Fan	4:30
4.	"A Hundred Excuses but U"	Ray Huang	3:03
5.	"Walk Slowly"	Gu Yu-An	3:47
6.	"Ivory Echo"	Tree of Life	4:05
7.	"1% a day"	CN	2:57

== Reception ==
The series received generally favorable reviews. On MyDramaList, it holds a rating of 7.6 out of 10 from 2,700 users. On IMDb, it has a score of 7.0 based on 104 ratings.

Critics praised the emotional depth and performances of the lead actors. HK01 highlighted the series’ exploration of body-swap dynamics and its bold romantic scenes. Liberty Times noted the series’ supernatural themes and its resonance with older audiences. MSN Taiwan covered the emotional finale and cast interviews.

== Home media ==
=== Television ===
The series was broadcast on SET Metro every sunday at 11pm starting on June 29, 2025.

=== Streaming ===
The series was made available on VBL Series YouTube channel every Friday at 8pm starting on June 27, 2025. It has also been made available on GTV Drama YouTube channel, iQIYI, GagaOOLala and Rakuten TV.

Behind The Scenes, Instagram live and actors react videos were available on VBL Series YouTube channel.

=== Blu-ray and DVD ===
The series was released on DVD and Blu-ray in Japan on March 13, 2026.

=== Photobook ===
The Promise of the Soul Photobook (ISBN 9786264350150) was released in Taiwan on July 30, 2025.

== Live Events ==
- June 20, 2025："The Promise of the Soul" Special Screening
- June 26, 2025："The Promise of the Soul" Premiere
- August 31, 2025："The Promise of the Soul" The Finale Fan Screening
- September 28, 2025："The Promise of the Soul" Fan meeting
