= Prohibition on Face Covering Regulation =

Legislation of Hong Kong

The Chief Executive in Council
- Citation: Cap. 241K
- Territorial extent: Hong Kong
- Enacted by: The Chief Executive in Council
- Enacted: 5 October 2019
- Commenced: 5 October 2019
- Status: Not fully in force

The Prohibition on Face Covering Regulation (Cap. 241K) ("PFCR") is a regulation prohibiting the wearing of face coverings in certain circumstances made by Chief Executive in Council under the Emergency Regulations Ordinance due to the 2019–2020 Hong Kong protests.

The Court of First Instance heard applications for judicial review from 24 members of the Legislative Council (LegCo) and Leung Kwok-hung, a former LegCo member, submitted in early October. On 18 November, it ruled that both the prohibition on the wearing of masks and related powers granted to the police to enforce it are inconsistent with the Hong Kong Bill of Rights, whilst leaving the question of relief to a future hearing. On 22 November, the court declared the PFCR invalid and of no effect, but suspended the application of that declaration till 29 November 2019. The government appealed the decision on 25 November to the Court of Appeal, (Note: The Court of Appeal is the second highest court in Hong Kong; appeals may only be made to the Court of Final Appeal. Applications for judicial review were initially made to the Court of First Instance. The Courts of First Instance and Appeal collectively constitute the High Court.) which partially allowed the government's appeal. The prohibition of masks at unauthorised assemblies was ruled to be constitutional, but the power to remove masks and the prohibition on wearing masks at authorised assemblies was ruled unconstitutional. On appeal, the Court of Final Appeal upheld the constitutionality of the PFCR in its entirety, including the prohibition on face coverings at authorised assemblies and processions.

== Provisions of the PFCR ==
The regulation contains six sections. Section 1 provides for the citation of the PFCR, and section 2 some definitions.

Section 3 prohibits the use of "any facial covering that is likely to prevent identification" at unlawful and unauthorised assemblies, and public meetings and processions as defined by the Public Order Ordinance (POO). In the POO, the terms “public meeting” and “public procession” have their plain meaning; an assembly is unauthorised under the POO where it is a public meeting or procession not granted permission by the Commissioner of Police, or any other public gathering in contravention of a direction made by the Commissioner in that connection or an order to disperse. Persons who contravene this prohibition are liable on conviction to a fine at level four (HK$25,000) and imprisonment of one year.

Section 4 allows for two defences: first, in the case that a mask was worn with lawful authority, and, second, if worn with a reasonable excuse. Reasonable excuses envisaged include but are not limited to wearing masks for professional reasons, religious reasons, or pre-existing health reasons.

Section 5 provides that a police officer may require a person to remove a face covering in order to identify them. If that person refuses, an offence is committed punishable with a fine at level 3 ($10,000) and imprisonment of 6 months; the police officer may forcibly remove it.

Section 6 requires that any prosecution for any offence created by the PFCR shall not commence more than 12 months after its occurrence.

== Judicial review ==
The Court of First Instance (CFI) ruled that the granting of powers to the Chief Executive in Council on an occasion of public danger by the ERO was unconstitutional, and, therefore, that the entirety of the PFCR was unconstitutional because it was in exercise of those powers. On separate grounds it also declared all the substantive sections of the PFCR excepting that prohibiting the use of masks at an unlawful assembly inconsistent with the Basic Law and the Bill of Rights, and therefore of no effect.

The Court of Appeal ruled that the ERO was in fact constitutional on occasions of public danger, and therefore that the PFCR was not invalid on those grounds. It additionally held that section 3(1)(b) of the PFCR, which prohibited masks at certain "unauthorised assemblies", is proportionate, and therefore valid, but upheld the decision of the CFI that the PFCR is invalid insofar as it prohibits masks at authorised assemblies and meetings.

On 21 December 2020, the Court of Final Appeal ruled that the prohibition on the use of face coverings at public gatherings, regardless of legality, was constitutional.

== Reactions ==
=== Initial reaction ===
In response to the government's implementation of the law, a speech by Edward Leung in a televised debate during the 2016 Legco election was widely shared on the internet: “a few years ago, Ukraine passed an anti-mask law. Do you know what happened in Ukraine? A revolution started in Ukraine. You want to do it? Do it, we will fight till the end.”

=== Court of First Instance ruling ===
The central government immediately criticised the Court of First Instance's ruling, causing concern for the independence of Hong Kong’s judiciary.

In response, the government said that it would stop enforcing the ban for the time being. Jian Tiewei, a spokesman from the Chinese legislative affairs commission, however, stated that "Whether the laws of the Hong Kong Special Administrative Region comply with the Basic Law of Hong Kong can only be judged and decided by the standing committee of the National People’s Congress".

=== Court of Appeal ruling ===
A commentary in the state-run China Daily said that the Court of Appeal's partial allowing of the government's appeal "strengthens the rule of law", though criticised it for allowing those at permitted assemblies to wear masks.

== See also ==
- Anti-mask law
- Chief Executive of Hong Kong
- COVID-19 pandemic in Hong Kong
- Emergency Regulations Ordinance
- Public Order Ordinance
