= Taste Hunter =

Hong Kong TV travel show

- Genre: Food Reality
- Presented by: Martin Wong, Kenji Fan
- Original languages: Cantonese, Mandarin
- No. of seasons: 1
- No. of episodes: 10

Production
- Running time: 30 minutes

Original release
- Network: ViuTV
- Release: September 4 – September 15, 2023

Taste Hunter (Chinese: 甜酸苦辣鮮) is a Hong Kong food travel reality show on ViuTV. It is hosted by Martin Wong and Kenji Fan. They travel to Taiwan and Singapore to taste different food.

== Episodes ==
=== Season 1 (2023) ===
No. in series	Title	Original air date
1	"Taiwan: Sweet"	September 4, 2023
2	"Taiwan: Sour"	September 5, 2023
3	"Taiwan: Bitter"	September 6, 2023
4	"Taiwan: Spicy"	September 7, 2023
5	"Taiwan: Fresh"	September 8, 2023
6	"Singapore: Sweet"	September 11, 2023
7	"Singapore: Sour"	September 12, 2023
8	"Singapore: Bitter"	September 13, 2023
9	"Singapore: Spicy"	September 14, 2023
10	"Singapore: Fresh"	September 15, 2023

== Promotional activities ==
- August 1, 2023：Supper On Time Ep.107
- September 10, 2023：Viu1 Interview
- September 11, 2023："Taste Hunter" Press Conference
