= Find Your Voice =

2020 Hong Kong film by Adrian Kwan

- Official film poster
- Traditional Chinese: 熱血合唱團
- Simplified Chinese: 热血合唱团
- Hanyu Pinyin: Rè Xuè Hé Chàng Tuán
- Jyutping: Jit6 Hyut3 Hap6 Ceong3 Tyun4
- Directed by: Adrian Kwan
- Screenplay by: Adrian Kwan; Hannah Cheung
- Produced by: Andy Lau; Chan Pui-wah; Esther Koo; Alice Chan; Steven Hui
- Starring: Andy Lau
- Cinematography: Xavier Cheung
- Edited by: Wong Hoi
- Music by: Wong Kin-wai; Harry Ng
- Production companies: Infinitus Entertainment; Bona Film Group; Shanghai Bona Culture Media; Bona Entertainment; A Really Happy Film Distribution
- Distributed by: Distribution Workshop (Hong Kong, Worldwide); A Really Happy Film Distribution (Hong Kong)
- Release date: 26 November 2020
- Running time: 96 minutes
- Country: Hong Kong
- Language: Cantonese
- Box office: HK$1,043,082

Find Your Voice is a 2020 Hong Kong drama film written and directed by Adrian Kwan, produced by and starring Andy Lau as a former internationally renowned conductor who resides in the United States, returns to Hong Kong lead a pessimistic group of choir students. The film was theatrically released on 26 November 2020.

== Plot ==
Form 4 student Fung Shun-Hei (Martin Wong) of a Band 3 secondary school is a well known typical neet who is bad-tempered and performs poorly in academics. One day, Shun-Hei gets in trouble for causing major havoc in school. However, headmaster Lo (Lowell Lo) gives him a final chance to redeem himself by requesting him to participate in the "Find Your Voice Trial Program" (熱血合唱團試驗計劃), a project which involves forming a classical music chorus composed of three Band 3 students who go in to nine months of special training to compete in the Intercollegiate Chorus Competition (校際合唱團比賽) afterwards. Without a choice, Shun-Hei reluctantly accepts the offer. The outside world views this project as one that is more difficult than reaching to the skies and teases them as the "Rotten Orange Chorus" (爛橙合唱團). However, unexpectedly, renowned Hong Kong-American conductor Joseph Yim (Andy Lau), dubbed the "Iron-Blooded Instructor" of the music industry, who have been living seclusion for a year, returns to Hong Kong to be the conductor of the chorus.

== Cast ==
- Andy Lau as Joseph Yim (嚴梓朗), an internationally renowned conductor
- Lowell Lo as Headmaster Lo (盧校長)
- Martin Wong as Fung Shun Hei
- Mark Lui
- Hugo Ng as a chancellor
- E Jingwen
- Tse Kwan-ho as Pok Man's father
- Rachel Lee as Shun Hei's mother
- Paulyn Sun as Siu Lung's mother
- Eddie Kwan Lai-Kit as Shun Hei's father
- Wan Yeung-ming as Wan Yee's father

== Production ==
Find Your Voice was filmed primarily in Hong Kong and partly in the United States, with the latter location shoot taking place in January 2017 where producer and star Andy Lau took part. Lau stated he originally was only going to serve as the film's producer and his role was to be played by a little-known actor, but director Adrian Kwan and screenwriter Hannah Cheung persuaded him to take the role as his image suited that of a conductor. Therefore, Lau trained three months with a real conductor of a children's choir in order to convincingly portray the role. Production for the film wrapped up in March 2017.

== Music ==
The film's ending theme song is a cover of the 1993 song, Whom Will Understand Me (誰能明白我), sung by Andy Lau. The song was composed by George Lam, who is also the original singer, with lyrics written by Cheng Kwok-kong.

The film's insert theme song is a cover of the classic song, Below the Lion Rock (獅子山下), also sung by Lau. The song was composed by Joseph Koo, with lyrics written by James Wong and was originally sung by Roman Tam.

== Release ==
Find Your Voice was theatrically released in Hong Kong on 26 November 2020.

=== Promotion ===
On 20 March 2019, a press conference for the film attended by the cast and crew was held at the 2019 Hong Kong International Film & TV Market (FILMART), where it also unveiled its first teaser trailer.

== Reception ==
=== Box office ===
Find Your Voice debuted at No. 2 on it opening weekend, grossing HK$830,904 after its first four days of release. On its second weekend, the film grossed HK$212,178 and remained at No. 2, having grossed a total of HK$1,043,082 so far. The film's theatrical run is temporarily suspended in Hong Kong due to cinema closures from 2 to 23 December 2020 amid the fourth wave of the COVID-19 pandemic in Hong Kong.

=== Critical reception ===
Lim Yian-lu of Yahoo! Lifestyle gave the film a score of 3/5 stars, praising the positive and positive vibes the film gives out, but notes some logic issues in the ending. Edmund Lee of the South China Morning Post gave the film a score of 2.5/5 stars, complementing its inspiration story, but notes its shortcomings in the script.

== See also ==
- Andy Lau filmography
