= Elle Men =

Worldwide lifestyle magazine

- Categories: Fashion
- Frequency: Monthly (worldwide)
- First issue: 2005 (Romania); 2011 (China); 2012 (Vietnam); 2013 (Turkey, Hong Kong); 2021 (Mexico, Singapore, Thailand)
- Company: Lagardère Group
- Language: Romanian, Chinese, Vietnamese, Turkish, Spanish, English, Thai
- Website: elle.ro/elle-man; ellemen.com; elleman.vn; ellemen.com.hk; elle.mx/elle-man; elle.com.sg/men; ellementhailand.com

International logo, used in some regions

Elle Man or Elle Men is a magazine for men featuring the latest trends in style, culture and society. Present in 8 countries, the magazine highlights the latest in fashion, grooming, travel and celebrities. It is adapted from Elle and owned by the Lagardère Group with licensed publishers in many countries. Depending on the region of the publishing house, the number of issues varies from three to twelve per year. According to a 2011 study, Elle Men ranked first in sales in its segment in cities such as Shanghai, Beijing and Guangzhou. The magazine's market share is about 40%, which is ahead of GQ and Esquire.

== International editions ==
In March 2011, Elle Men was launched in China by Hearst Magazines China. October of 2012 saw the launch of Elle Man in Canada by TC Media. In September 2013, the Hong Kong version of Elle Men was introduced by the South China Morning Post. In October 2015, Elle Man debuted in Poland, published by Burda International Polska. Previously, Elle Man had also been published in the Czech Republic by Burda International CZ s.r.o. In March 2020, the Russian edition of Elle presented the first issue Elle Man, published by Hearst Shkulev Media. In October 2013, the launch of Elle Man in France was announced, joining the 11 existing international editions of Elle Man. Elle Men Thailand jointly with Elle Thailand is the organizer of men's fashion week in Bangkok. Previously, the Elle Man Awards took place in Ukraine.

== See also ==
- List of fashion magazines
- List of men's magazines
