= Emergency Regulations Ordinance =

Legislation of Hong Kong

Legislative Council of Hong Kong
- Long title: An Ordinance to confer on the Chief Executive in Council power to make regulations on occasions of emergency or public danger.
- Citation: Cap. 241
- Enacted by: Legislative Council of Hong Kong
- Commenced: 28 February 1922

Legislative history
- Bill title: Strike Legislation Bill 1922
- Introduced by: Attorney General Joseph Horsford Kemp
- First reading: 28 February 1922
- Second reading: 28 February 1922
- Third reading: 28 February 1922
- Status: Amended

The Emergency Regulations Ordinance (Cap. 241) is a law of Hong Kong that confers on the Chief Executive in Council the power to make regulations on occasions that the Chief Executive believes to be an emergency or public danger. It was first introduced in colonial Hong Kong in 1922 to combat the seamen's strikes which had immobilised the city's ports, and was invoked on several occasions during the colonial rule.

In case of emergency or public danger, it can be invoked by the Chief Executive-in-Council. Under the provisions of the ordinance, the Chief Executive has the power to make "any regulations whatsoever which he may consider desirable in the public interest." Among the many powers permitting the Chief Executive to exercise upon invoking the ordinance, it also include arrests, property seizures, deportation, control of the ports and transportation, and censorship.

The government invoked the ordinance during the 1967 Hong Kong riots, during the oil crisis in 1973, during the 2019–20 Hong Kong protests and postponing the 2020 Legislative Council election.

== Context ==
In January 1922, the Chinese Seamen's Union demanded pay rises of up to 40% from their local employers, and some 30,000 Chinese seamen went on strike. Their grievances lay in the fact that the average Chinese port worker's monthly income was insufficient to support his family while his Caucasian counterparts, who earned several times more, had been granted 15% wage rise. The Emergency Regulations Ordinance was passed by the colonial government that year – enacted in a single day – to combat the strikes, which paralysed the ports.

The original Ordinance was not subject to Legislative Council oversight or disallowance in London. It also permitted imprisonment without trial.

Aside from format changes made in 2018, the last major amendments to the ordinance was in 1999.

== Invocations ==
=== Colonial period ===
The Government invoked the emergency law for several times in the early 20th century, including: in 1925 to order a clampdown on Canton–Hong Kong strike, in 1929 to seize water supply during a drought, in 1932 to ban selling of food by hawkers following cholera outbreak in China, in 1935 to prohibit horses leaving New Territories and consuming grass amidst case of mule contracting rabies.

After the end of World War II, immigrants from China swamped Hong Kong and issues of illegal trafficking hit the city. The Government enacted a considerable number of emergency laws. In 1949, a total of 137 Emergency (Principal) Regulations were made to resume lands near the border to avoid the infiltration of communists. Coin storage a year later pushed the Government to ban coin hoarding. Hong Kong Government enacted emergency law later that year which allowed capital punishment for possession of bombs and firearms, only to be repealed after the London Government considered the law to be in violation of human rights. In 1952, emergency law related to resettlement areas was enacted, paving way for charities and groups to set up cottage resettlements accommodating immigrants.

In 1954, Colonial Office in London asked Hong Kong to repeal some articles deemed too powerful in the Emergency (Principal) Regulations. The Government first rejected, saying no objection was made by the locals and citing necessity to stop crimes. Nevertheless, the Government agreed to the Colonial Office and revoked them in September 1955.

During the 1956 riots, Emergency (Detention Orders) Regulations were enacted to depot rioters. Chief Justice and JUSTICE, a human rights organisation based in Britain, slammed the Regulations as infringements of foreigner's rights, after some were in long-time detention without trial. The Attorney General and Governor defended, saying the Regulations were needed to prevent riots from happening again.

Emergency laws were made to limit daily money withdrawal to HKD 100 in 1965 after a bank run, and to announce one-day bank holidays following sterling devaluation in 1967.

As widespread riots broke out in 1967, the Governor and Colonial Secretary of Hong Kong announced (at least) five emergency regulations:

- Emergency (Prevention of Inflammatory Speeches) Regulations, enacted on 24 May to ban seditious speeches;
- Emergency (Prevention of Inflammatory Posters) Regulations, enacted on 1 June to ban seditious posters;
- Emergency (Closed Area) Regulations, enacted on 23 June which empowered Governor to designate any closed areas;
- Emergency (Prevention of Intimidation) Regulations, enacted on 24 June to criminalise gatherings which intimidations by participants were found;
- Emergency (Principal) Regulations (Commencement) Order, announced on 20 July to enact nine new emergency laws, such as criminalising assemblies, obstructions, conferring power to disperse rallies, seal off housing estates, and allowing closed-door trial;
- Emergency (Firework) Regulations, enacted on 8 September to seize all fireworks in order to stop rioters from possessing bomb-making materials;
- Emergency (Amendment of Magistrates Ordinance) Regulations

The Emergency (Principal) Regulation was amended on 22 July to empower police officers to raid any flats without warrant, and require anyone to report offensive weapons found to police. The invocations of emergency law was generally accepted by the citizens as the riots worsened with explosives harming innocents, but the perpetrating leftists and supporters were angered. Many of those emergency laws were suspended in 1969 or repealed.

The last significant use of the law was in December 1973 during the oil crisis. Regulations were made to control the use of oil and motor fuel, to limit advertising displays and floodlighting, and to impose summer time. Since then, emergency law was in dormant, with the remaining unused regulations repealed in 1995. In 1995 under Governor Chris Patten, the Hong Kong government repealed most of the Ordinance but left the parent instrument intact which allowed for the SAR government to restore the Ordinance in full after the handover.

=== After handover ===
Emergency Regulations Ordinance has been invoked for four times as of early 2022 since handover of Hong Kong in 1997, all during the tenue of Carrie Lam as Chief Executive:

- Prohibition on Face Covering Regulation
- Emergency (Date of General Election) (Seventh Term of the Legislative Council) Regulation
- Emergency (Date of Election) (Sixth Term Chief Executive) Regulation
- Emergency (Exemption from Statutory Requirements) (COVID-19) Regulation

==== Anti-mask law ====
On 4 October 2019, as a response to the 2019–20 Hong Kong protests and "deterring violent and illegal behavior", the Chief-Executive-in-Council invoked the Emergency Regulations Ordinance to implement Prohibition on Face Covering Regulation (PFCR). The regulation ban wearing face masks or obscure facial identification in public assemblies without reasonable excuses. The permitted excuses are: pre-existing medical or health reasons, religious reasons, and if the person uses the face covering for physical safety while performing an activity connected with their profession or employment. Effective 00:00 HKT on 5 October 2019, offenders risked a maximum of one-year imprisonment or a fine of HK$25,000 (US$3,200).

The Court of First Instance (CFI) denied an application for a judicial injunction of the anti-mask law, on the same night shortly before the new regulation took effect. A subsequent attempt by pro-democrats to halt the new regulation also failed, however, the court recommended a judicial review at a later date.

The CFI later ruled that the granting of powers to the Chief Executive in Council on an occasion of public danger by the ERO was unconstitutional, and, therefore, that the entirety of the PFCR was unconstitutional because it was in exercise of those powers. On separate grounds it also declared all the substantive sections of the PFCR excepting that prohibiting the use of masks at an unlawful assembly inconsistent with the Basic Law and the Bill of Rights, and therefore of no effect.

The Court of Appeal ruled that the ERO was in fact constitutional on occasions of public danger, and therefore that the PFCR was not invalid on those grounds. It additionally held that section 3(1)(b) of the PFCR, which prohibited masks at certain ‘unauthorised assemblies’, is proportionate, and therefore valid, but upheld the decision of the CFI that the PFCR is invalid insofar as it prohibits masks at authorised assemblies and meetings.

==== Election postponement ====
On 31 July 2020, Chief Executive Carrie Lam said she would invoke the Emergency Regulations Ordinance to postpone the 2020 Legislative Council election for a whole year, citing the resurgence of the COVID-19 cases. The Chief Executive in Council invoked the Emergency Regulations Ordinance to make the Emergency (Date of General Election) (Seventh Term of the Legislative Council) Regulation which was promulgated on 1 August, officially suspended the electoral process. The Regulation was further amended to delay the election again following the electoral overhaul.

On 18 February 2022, Carrie Lam, citing the unprecedented surge of COVID-19 cases in the fifth wave, announced the enactment of new emergency regulation, Emergency (Date of Election) (Sixth Term Chief Executive) Regulation, for the postponement of 2022 Chief Executive election from 27 March to 8 May. The decision came after Xi Jinping, General Secretary of Chinese Communist Party, ordered the Hong Kong Government to halt the COVID surge by all means, despite saying a week ago that the postponement is not needed.

==== Chinese aid exemptions ====
On 24 February 2022, Emergency (Exemption from Statutory Requirements) (COVID-19) Regulation came into effect after the Chief Executive invoked emergency power, in order to provide legal basis for the Chinese Government to provide aids amidst the fifth wave of pandemic.

== Constitutionality ==
Scholars consider the law "a nuclear option" which "can literally run a dictatorship and suspend most rights." The authority granted to censor specifically covers "the control and suppression of publications, writings, maps, plans, photographs, communications and means of communication."

On 18 November 2019, the High Court ruled the "Cap. 241 Emergency Regulations Ordinance" is "incompatible with the Basic Law", however, the court "leaves open the question of the constitutionality of the ERO insofar as it relates to any occasion of emergency." The court also held the ordinance meets the "prescribed by law" requirement.

On 22 November 2019, the High Court made the following remark:

"Nevertheless, we recognise that our Judgment is only a judgment at first instance, and will soon be subject to an appeal to the Court of Appeal. In view of the great public importance of the issues raised in this case, and the highly exceptional circumstances that Hong Kong is currently facing, we consider it right that we should grant a short interim suspension order so that the respondents may have an opportunity to apply to the Court of Appeal, if so advised, for such interim relief as may be appropriate. Accordingly, we shall grant an interim temporary suspension order to postpone the coming into operation of the declarations of invalidity for a period of 7 days up to the end of 29 November 2019, with liberty to apply."

On 26 November 2019, it was announced that the government's appeal would be heard on 9 January 2020.

On 27 November 2019, the Court of Appeal extended the interim suspension of the judgement until 10 December 2019.

On 10 December 2019, the Court of Appeal refused to suspend the "unconstitutional" ruling by the Court of First Instance on the anti-mask regulation. As scheduled, a full hearing will commence on 9 January 2020.

On 9 April 2020, the court ruled that the ERO, insofar as occasions of public danger are concerned, is constitutional and therefore valid.
