= Chief Executive-in-Council =

Constitutional term in Hong Kong

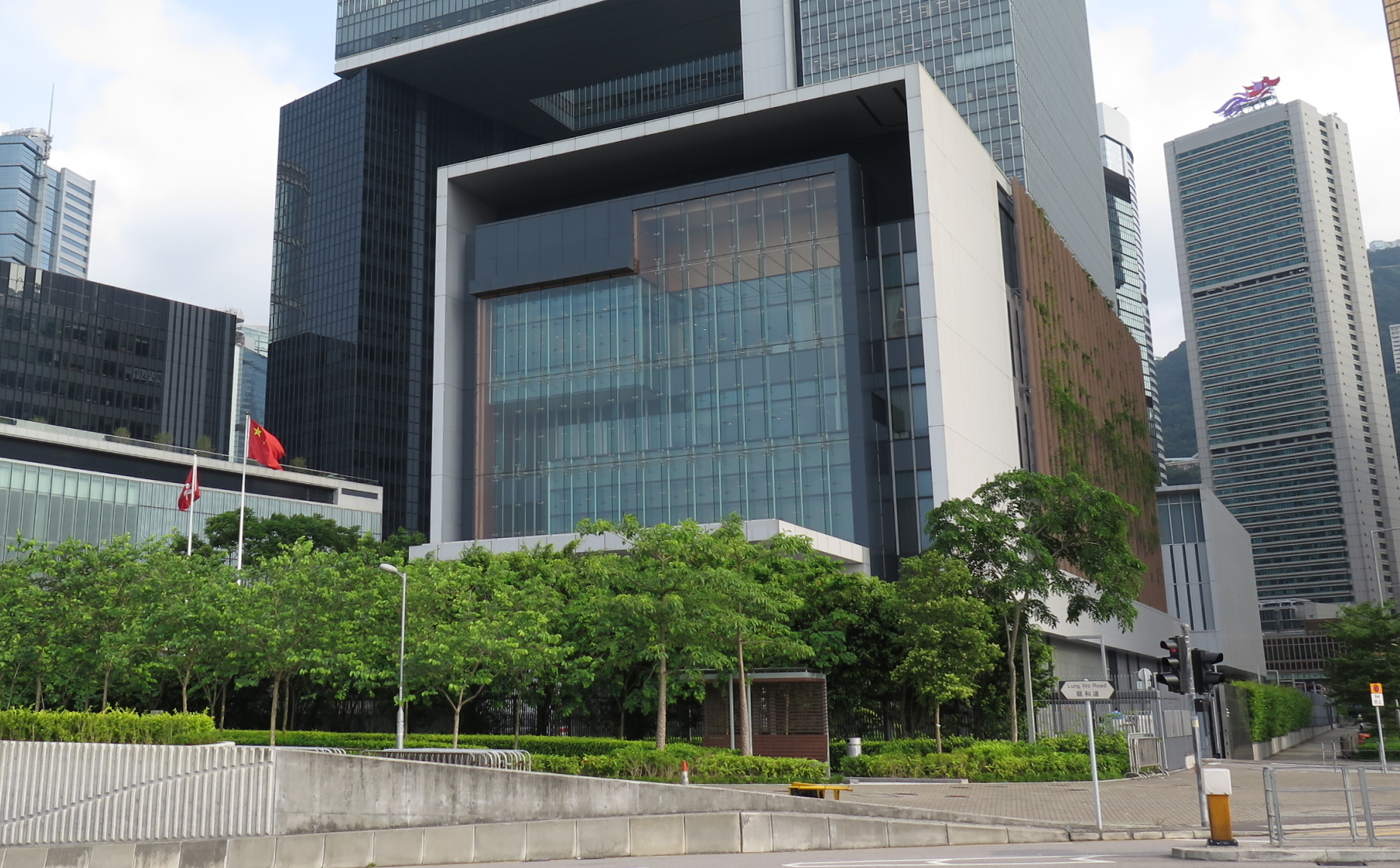
The Low Block of the Central Government Complex in Tamar, where the Chief Executive's office and the Executive Council is located.

The Chief Executive-in-Council (Chinese: 行政長官會同行政會議) is a constitutional term in Hong Kong that refers to the exercise of executive power by the Chief Executive of Hong Kong after seeking the opinion of the Executive Council. The Basic Law stipulates that the Chief Executive must consult the Executive Council before introducing government bills, enacting subordinate legislation, or making important policy decisions.

== History ==
=== British Hong Kong (1841-1997) ===
The equivalent phrase in British Hong Kong was the Governor-in-Council (Chinese: 總督會同行政局). The Letters Patent conferred upon the governor substantive lawmaking powers, with the standard enacting formula describing legislation as being "enacted by the Governor of Hongkong, with the Advice of the Legislative Council thereof".

=== After the Handover (1997-present) ===
After the transfer of sovereignty from the UK to China on 1 July 1997, statutory references to the Governor-in-Council were gradually replaced with the new Chief Executive-in-Council. The status of the Chief Executive differs from the Governor in that while the Chief Executive inherits the latter's role as head of government, the Chief Executive is not the representative of the Chinese government in Hong Kong (this role belongs to the head of the Hong Kong Liaison Office), in contrast to the governor, who was the British monarch's viceregal representative in the colony. Unlike the governor, the Chief Executive-in-Council can only legislate on areas where power has been delegated to him or her by the Legislative Council.

== Constitutional implications ==
Leung Chun-ying, who was convenor of the non-official members of the Executive Council from 1999 to 2011 and later Chief Executive from 2012 to 2017, has argued that the commonly used Chinese version of the term ("會同"; wui6 tung4, meaning "together", "with" or "in tandem") wrongly suggests that the Chief Executive can only act in accordance with the opinion of the Executive Council. The correct position, as provided for in Article 56 in the Basic Law, is that the Chief Executive may choose not to accept a majority opinion of the council. This differs from the position in conventional Westminster-based systems, where the monarch or governor-general is bound to accept the advice of their privy council or executive council, and, by convention, cannot exercise their executive power unless advised to do so by the council.

While Orders-in-Council in Westminster-based systems can include both primary and secondary legislation, the Chief Executive-in-Council only has the power to make secondary legislation, which are typically known as rules, orders or regulations.

== See also ==
- King-in-Council
- Order in Council
