= Stent (disambiguation) =

A stent is a tube or truss used in medicine to keep an anatomical passageway open.

Stent may also refer to:

- Stent (surname), a surname (including a list of people with the name)
- Mount Stent, a mountain in Antarctica
- Star Trek: Enterprise, a TV series

== See also ==
- Stint (disambiguation)
