= Lady Meng Jiang =

Protagonist of a Chinese folktale

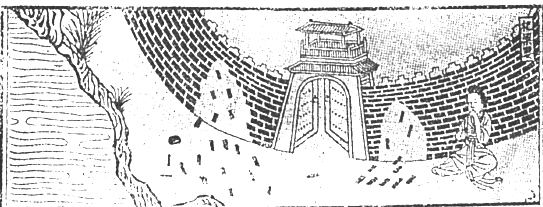
Lady Meng Jiang weeps at the Great Wall (Southern Song illustration for Biographies of Exemplary Women)

Lady Meng Jiang or Meng Jiang Nü (Chinese: 孟姜女; pinyin: Mèng Jiāng Nǚ) is a Chinese tale with many variations. Later versions of the tale are usually set in the Qin dynasty; in those tales, Lady Meng Jiang's newly married husband was pressed into service by imperial officials and sent as corvée labor to work in the construction of the Great Wall of China. Lady Meng Jiang heard nothing after his departure, so she set out to bring him winter clothes. Unfortunately, by the time she reached the Great Wall, her husband had already died. Hearing the news, she wept so bitterly that a part of the Great Wall collapsed, revealing his bones.

The story is now counted as one of China's Four Great Folktales, the others being The Legend of the White Snake (Baishezhuan), the Butterfly Lovers, and The Weaver Girl and the Cowherd (Niulang Zhinü). Chinese folklorists in the early 20th century discovered that the legend existed in many forms and genres and evolved over the last 2,000 years.

The section of the Great Wall that was toppled in the legend is the Great Wall of Qi in today's Shandong Province. The Temple of Lady Meng Jiang, whose origins are sometimes dated to the Song dynasty, was constructed or reconstructed in 1594, during the Ming dynasty, at the eastern beginning of the Ming Great Wall in Qinhuangdao of Hebei Province. It is still in existence.

Originally, "Meng" was not her family name. "Meng Jiang" would have been a very common name for women in the state of Qi, as "Jiang" was the surname of the Qi ruler and much of its nobility, and "Meng" meant "eldest child" not born to the main wife.

In 2006, the legend of Meng Jiang was included in the first collection of national intangible cultural heritage listed by the State Council of China.

== Development ==
The legend developed into many variations in both form and content, with different versions emphasizing different elements of the story such as Lady Meng Jiang's marriage, her relationship with her parents-in-law, the journey to the wall, and her grief.

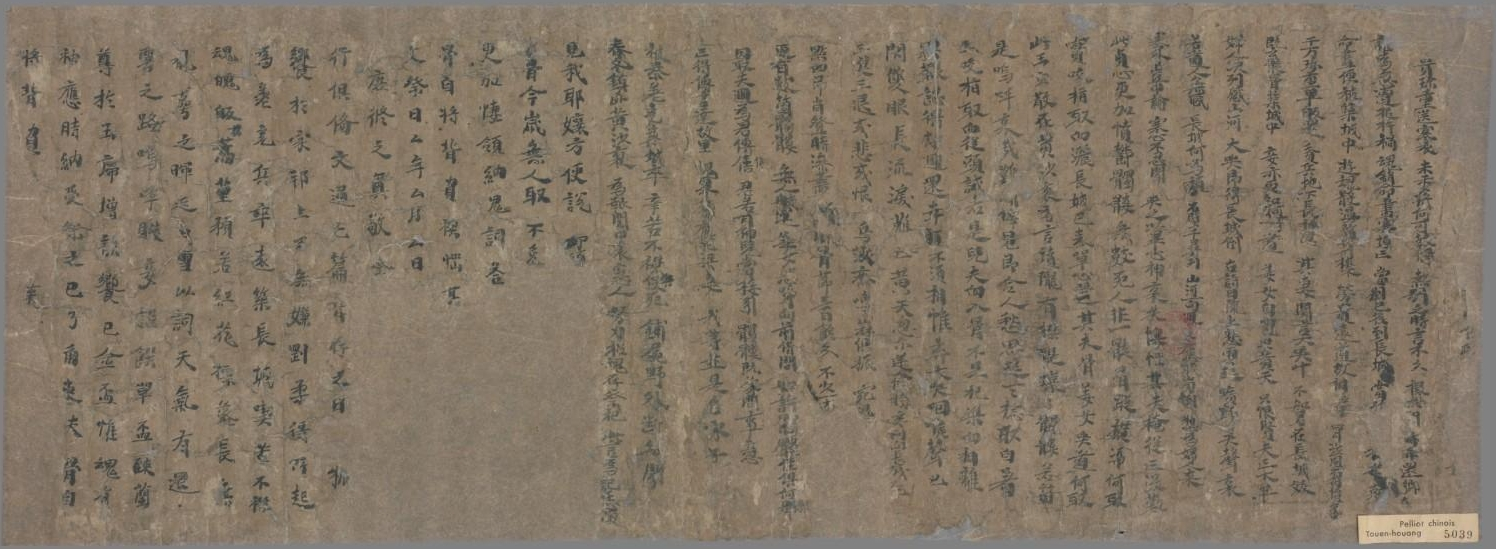
Lady Meng Bianwen Dunhuang Manuscript

Although the later, fully developed forms of the legend take place in the Qin dynasty, the seeds of the tale lie in a simple anecdote in the Zuozhuan, a chronicle of the far earlier Spring and Autumn period. The anecdote says that after a warrior of the state of Qi, Qi Liang (杞梁), was killed in battle, his Lord, Duke Zhuang, met Qi Liang's wife on the road and asked his servant to convey his condolences to her. Qi Liang's wife replied that she could not receive condolences on the road, and Duke Zhuang visited her at home and left only when the proper ceremonies had been completed.

In the Han dynasty, the Confucian scholar Liu Xiang expanded this anecdote both in his Garden of Stories (Shuoyuan) an anthology, and in his Biographies of Exemplary Women (Lienü zhuan), which was meant to show proper behavior for women. In this version the woman, whose family is not mentioned, is still called simply "Qi Liang's Wife" and given no other name. The story explained that

"when her husband died, she had no children, nor any relatives, and had no place to return to. She wailed over the corpse of her husband at the foot of the city wall, and the sincerity of her grief was such that none of the passers-by was not moved to tears. Ten days later the wall toppled down."

After her husband's burial was properly carried out, she said "Now I have no father, no husband, and no son.... All I can do is die."

The woman was not called "Lady Meng" until the Tang dynasty, when the bare exemplary anecdote was expanded with many new details. The years of wars and regional wall-building leading up to the founding of the dynasty, concludes Arthur Waldron's history of the Great Wall, revived memories of the First Emperor and his wall. These fresh memories and the stereotyped themes of suffering in Tang dynasty poetry were combined with the story of Qi Liang's wife to make a new set of stories which were now set in the Qin dynasty. In one version, Qi Liang flees the hardship of labor on the Great Wall in the north and enters the Meng family garden to hide in a tree and sees the young lady bathing. He at first refuses her demand that she be his wife, saying that such a well-born woman cannot marry a conscript, but she replies "A woman's body cannot be seen by more than one man". In another version, they make love before going to see her parents.

The other essential character of the fully developed legend, the First Emperor, does not join her until the versions produced in the Song dynasty, when he had become a stock villain. It was not until the Ming dynasty, however, when the Great Wall as we know it was constructed, that the Great Wall is named as the wall in the story and that Lady Meng is said to have committed suicide by throwing herself from it into the ocean (in spite of the fact that there is no place at that point from which she could throw herself).

Popular versions only at this point tell the reader that this story happened during the reign of the wicked, unjust Emperor Qin Shi Huangdi, who decided to build a wall to keep the barbarians from invading his kingdom. But the wall kept disintegrating, and the construction made little progress. A clever scholar told the Emperor "Your method of building the wall is making the whole country tremble and will cause many revolts to break out. I have heard of a man called Wan Xiliang. Since the name 'Wan' means 'ten-thousand,' You need only fetch this one man." The Emperor was delighted and sent for Wan, but Wan heard of the danger and ran away.

In the form which came to be most common, after suffering pain and exhaustion laboring on the Great Wall, Wan Xiliang died. When winter came, Lady Meng Jiang had heard no news and insisted on taking winter garments to her husband. Over her parents' objections and paying no attention to her own fatigue, she traveled over mountains and rivers to arrive at the Great Wall, only to find that her husband had died. She collapsed in tears. She did not know how to identify her husband's bones, and cried until the wall collapsed and exposed a pile of human bones. She still could not identify her husband's remains, so she pricked her finger and prayed that her blood would penetrate only her husband's bones.

When the Emperor heard of Lady Meng, he had her brought before him. Her beauty so struck him that he decided to marry her. She agreed only on three conditions: First, a festival of 49 days should be held in her husband's honor; second, the Emperor and all his officials should be present at the burial; and, third, he should build a terrace 49 feet tall on the bank of the river, where she would make a sacrificial offering to her husband. After these three conditions were met, she would marry the Emperor. Qin Shi Huangdi granted her requests at once. When all was ready she climbed the terrace and began to curse the Emperor and denounce his cruelty and wickedness. When she had finished, she leaped into the river and drowned herself.

== Variations and adaptations ==
Lady Meng appears in a ballad found among the Dunhuang manuscripts, which has been translated by Arthur Waley. It recounts that when Qi Liang died his body was built into the wall his soul wandered "among the thorns and brambles," but spoke to his wife saying "A poor soldier under the earth will not ever forget you." When his wife heard this, she broke into sobbing but she did not know where in the Great Wall to look for her husband's bones. But the collapse of the wall revealed so many bones that she could not tell which ones were her husband's. Then she bit her finger and drew blood, telling them "If this is my husband, the blood will sink deep into the bones." She asked the other lonely skulls if she could take a message to their families. All the souls of the dead then replied:

Spring and winter for ever we lie amid the yellow sands.
Bring word to our wives that pine desolate in their bowers
Telling them to chant the Summons to the Soul and keep up the sacrifices.

A popular song of later times, "Twelve Flower Months of Lady Meng Jiang" (Meng Jiangnü shi’eryue hua), expresses sympathy with her:

The first month is the month of plum blossoms
Every family hangs its red lantern
"My neighbor's husband comes home united with his loved ones,
Only my husband is far away building the Great Wall!"

In a 19th-century variation, an imperial official has Lady Meng's husband killed, and tries to seduce her when she claims his body. She tricks him by giving him a robe to present to the emperor, who has him executed when it turns out to be black instead of yellow, the imperial color. Lady Meng then presents the emperor with the authentic dragon robe. In another late and elaborate story, Lady Meng floats out to sea on her husband's coffin. When the First Emperor threatens to drain the ocean and burn the palace of the dragon king in order to find her, a surrogate Lady Meng comes to the emperor's bed. In some versions, she is the mother of Xiang Yu, the prince who fights to replace the Qin dynasty and burns the Qin palace. Still another version portrays Lady Meng as a goddess who descends from heaven to follow her husband, who chooses to be reborn on earth in order to take the place of 10,000 men who would have been sacrificed to build the Great Wall.

By the 20th century, the legend had been adapted in every type of regional drama and ballad or song, developing variety in the characters, their actions, and in the attitude expected from the audience. In a version written in the women's script of Jiangyong gives many details of Lady Meng's emotions. It recounts her yearning for love and her grief on returning home to sleep each night with her husband's bones.

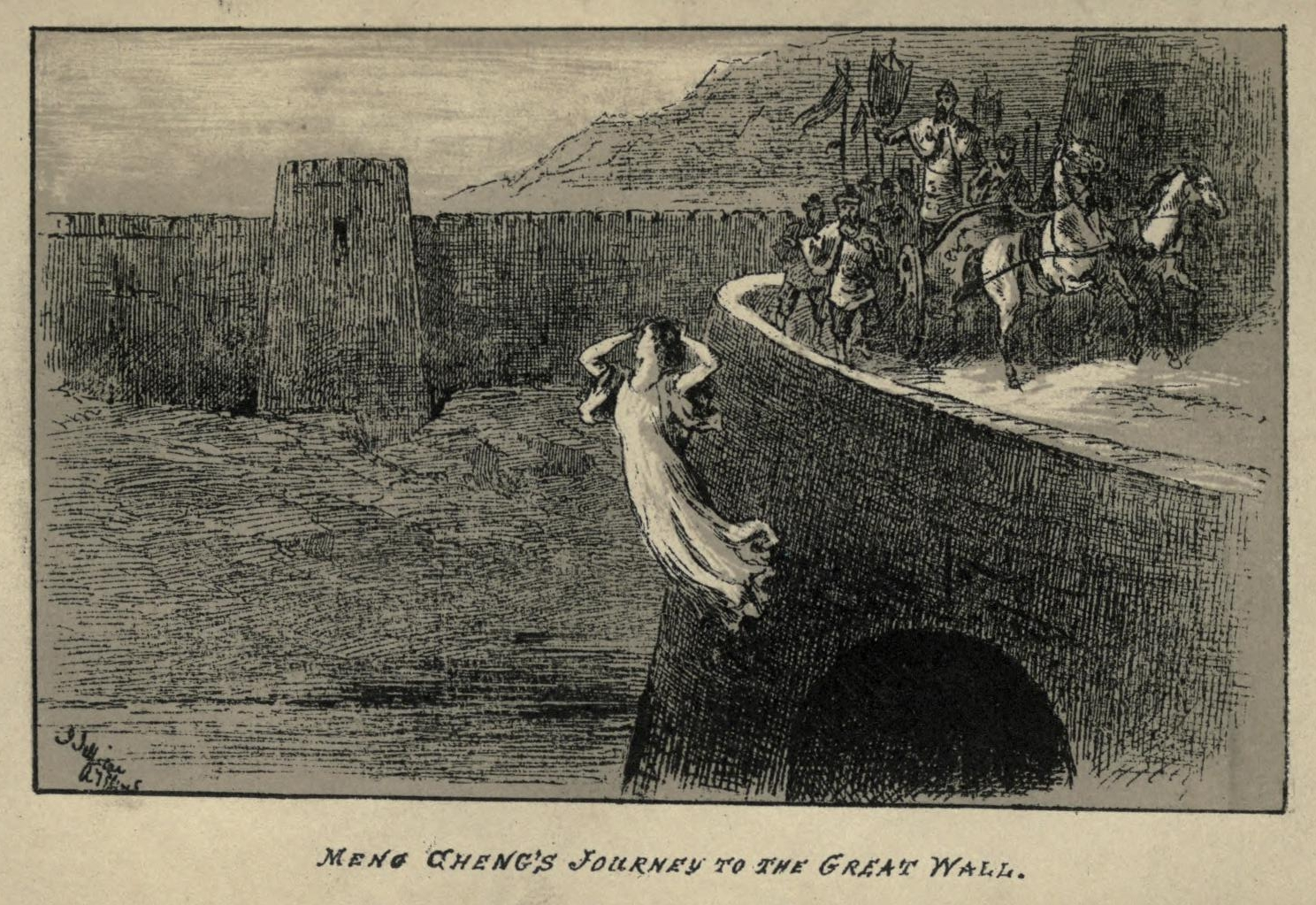
Illustration from Meng Cheng's Journey to the Great Wall (1878), translation by George Carter Stent

In the 1920s and 1930s the work of Chinese folklorists made the re-worked legend into the premier Chinese folktale. Even in the 19th century there had been an English translation, George Carter Stent's Meng Cheng's Journey to the Great Wall. In 1934 Genevieve Wimsatt and Geoffrey Chen chose another version to translate as The Lady of the Long Wall. Aaron Avshalomov, a Russian émigré composer who came from the United States to Shanghai, used the legend as the basis for his opera, The Great Wall, which was produced in November 1945, making it the first Western-style opera in Chinese. Although it was welcomed by audiences and had political support, the opera has not been performed widely since then.

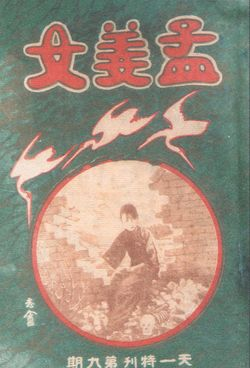
1926 Tianyi film Lady Meng Jiang, starring Hu Die

The earliest film of the story was the 1926 film starring the era's most famous actress Hu Die A number of films followed, including a 1970 Taiwan feature film.

== Changing interpretations ==
The New Culture Movement in the 1920s searched the past for authentic roots of the new Chinese nation they hoped to build. Gu Jiegang, the founder of Chinese folklore studies, used the western concept "myth" to reinterpret China's ancient history as a mythology to match the Greeks. They saw these legends as a way to show a direct line of connection to ancient China. Gu and his students searched archives and libraries to find new sources and made imaginative new interpretations of Lady Meng Jiang’s story. In articles such as the 1921 Meng Jiang Nü gushi de zhuanbian (The transformation of the Meng Jing Nü legend). Gu and his students were the first to find the connection between the sparse anecdote in the Zuozhuan, Liu Xiang’s fuller story of Qi Liang’s wife in the Han dynasty, and the Tang and Song dynasty story of Lady Meng Jiang weeping the Great Wall into crumbling. Gu and his students read the legend as the triumph of individual feeling over ritual, of women over power, and of the common people over feudal elites. They established the legend as Chinese premier folktale in the 1920s.

Gu was especially intrigued by Liu Xiang's Han dynasty story. Qi Liang's wife's unashamed weeping over her husband’s corpse in full public view was something the woman in the earlier anecdote would never have done – it defied Li, or ritual propriety. Gu first underlined the contradiction between her actions and Li, which in Liu Xiang's time was meant to counteract human emotion. Confucian ritual also called for strict gender segregation, even between husbands and wives. Gu deduced that Liu Xiang heard the story of weeping and suicide from uneducated villagers who projected their own feelings and sufferings onto Qi Liang's wife and that Liu included their story in his anthology without realizing its subversive nature. That is, Gu and his students saw Lady Meng Jiang as a tale of protest against state power which Confucian literati could not see because they were too oblivious of the common people. For these New Culture intellectuals "The Story of Lady Meng Jiang" was an act of long-term popular collective creativity, particularly on the part of women, who had the least power and the most to grieve about. The literati did not create this story, they stole it. Gu, however, says one scholar, probably went too far in overlooking the Confucian elements, such as Lady Meng Jiang's filial piety and the value which the common people put on it.

For the folklorists of the New Culture Movement, the Great Wall stood for tyrannical rule and Lady Meng Jiang embodied the resentment of the common people against inhuman feudal China. Liu Bannong, another New Culture folklore scholar, wrote a poem to show his admiration of the power of folk memory:

To this day people are still talking of Meng Jiang Nü
Yet no more is said of the First Emperor of Qin or the Martial Emperor of Han.
Throughout the ages nothing is sadder than an ordinary tragedy;
In her tears Meng Jiang Nü lives through all eternities.

The "creative misinterpretation," as Wilt Idema puts it, of these New Culture scholars and readers also reflects the radically new worldview which separated them from traditional audiences. Modern Chinese and western audiences, he says, saw romantic love "where it cannot have existed in the premodern versions." In the Tang dynasty version, because only a husband is allowed to see the body of his wife, Lady Meng Jiang marries an escaped prisoner who saw her while she was bathing. Modern readers see love as the only explanation for her actions, but Idema argues that a more traditional audience would condemn her if she acted out of passion rather than a moral feeling of shame.

Until the 20th century, some viewed the Great Wall as a symbol of despotism and cruelty, especially to women, but during the Second Sino-Japanese War (1937–1945) the Great Wall became the symbol of China's unity and will to fight. Mao Zedong identified himself with the First Emperor as China's great unifier. During the Cultural Revolution (1966–1976), in which Confucius became a symbol of feudal oppression, Lady Meng was attacked as an enemy of the First Emperor and denounced as a "pro-Confucian, anti-Legalist Great Poisonous Weed."

== Translations ==
- Chen, Rachel (2020). "Four Chinese Legends". A recent poetic rendition along with three other legends. ASIN B083QPHX7H
- Idema, W. L. (2008). Meng Jiangnü Brings Down the Great Wall : Ten Versions of a Chinese Legend. Seattle: University of Washington Press. ISBN 9780295987835.
- Stent, George Carter (1878).Entombed Alive and Other Songs, Ballads, etc. (From the Chinese) Open Library
- "Meng Chiang-nŭ at the Long Wall," (fragmentary Tang dynasty text found at Dunhuang) in Waley, Arthur (1960). Ballads and Stories from Tun-Huang: An Anthology. London: Allen & Unwin. ISBN 9780415361736., pp. 145–149; reprinted in Minford, John & Joseph S. M. Lau (2000). Classical Chinese Literature: An Anthology of Translations I. From Antiquity to the Tang Dynasty. New York; Hong Kong: Columbia University Press; The Chinese University Press. ISBN 0231096763., pp. 1079–1081.
- Wimsatt, Genevieve, George Chen (Chen Sun-han) (1934) The Lady of the Long Wall: A Ku-shih or Drum Song from the Chinese. New York: Columbia University Press.

== See also ==
- Kannagi

== References and further reading ==
- Doar, Bruce G. (2006). "The Rehabilitation–and Appropriation–of Great Wall Mythology". China Heritage Quarterly. 7.
- Hung, Chang-tai (1985). Going to the People: Chinese Intellectuals and Folk Literature, 1918–1937. Cambridge, Mass.: Harvard University Press. ISBN 0674356268.
- Idema, Wilt L. (2008). Meng Jiangnü Brings Down the Great Wall: Ten Versions of a Chinese Legend. Seattle: University of Washington Press. ISBN 9780295987835.
- —— (2010). "Meng Jiangnů and the Great Wall". In Kang-i Sun Chang; Stephen Owen (eds.). The Cambridge History of Chinese Literature. Cambridge University Press. ISBN 9780521855594., pp. 404–408
- —— (2012). "Old Tales for New Times: Some Comments on the Cultural Translation of China's Four Great Folktales in the Twentieth Century 二十世紀中國四大民間故事的文化翻譯" (PDF). Taiwan Journal of East Asian Studies. 9 (1): 25–46. Archived from the original (PDF) on 2014-10-06.
- Lee, Haiyan (2005). "Tears That Crumbled the Great Wall: The Archaeology of Feeling in the May Fourth Folklore Movement". Journal of Asian Studies. 64 (1): 35–65. doi:10.1017/S0021911805000057. S2CID 162697552.
- Lovell, Julia (2006). The Great Wall: China against the World, 1000 BC–2000 AD. New York: Grove Press. ISBN 0802118143.
- Man, John (2008). The Great Wall. Cambridge, MA: Da Capo Press. ISBN 9780306817670.
- Ouyang, Wenda 歐陽文達 (2013). 一本書還原歷史真相 Yiben shu huanyuan lishi zhenxiang (Truth in History). Taibei shi: Yuhe wenhua. ISBN 978-9576599507.
- Waldron, Arthur (1990). The Great Wall of China: From History to Myth. Cambridge; New York: Cambridge University Press. ISBN 052136518X.
