= 總理 =

總理, 总理, and 総理, mean prime minister in various East Asian languages. They may also refer to:

- Grand chancellor (China), the head of government in historical Chinese polities
- Zongli Yamen, a Qing dynasty government office
