= China and the West, 1858–1861 =

1964 academic book by Masataka Banno

China and the West, 1858–1861: The Origins of the Tsungli Yamen is a 1964 nonfiction English language book by Masataka Banno (坂野 正高 Banno Masataka), published by Harvard University Press. It describes the start of the Zongli Yamen and the political developments that resulted in the establishment of the "unequal treaties."

It is written for academics who have a focus on Chinese studies. Lloyd E. Eastman of Connecticut College stated that the work "is not for neophytes." Knight Biggerstaff of Cornell University stated that the book explains why the Qing dynasty officials had certain attitudes and treatments of non-Chinese people after the unequal treaties, and it also "clears up much of the misunderstanding" regarding international relations done by the Qing of that era.

== Background ==
Banno worked at Tokyo Metropolitan University, teaching history of diplomacy courses with the rank of professor. Banno published four articles about this topic, all written in Japanese, from 1952 to 1959. These articles were the basis of this book. Banno used materials from the Qing dynasty government, the American government, the British government, and the French government. The sources were written in five different languages. Some of the material Banno used was written in Russian. Some of his sources had been previously published, and some was un-published.

== Contents ==
The introduction is titled "Ch'ing Management of Foreign Relations prior to the Arrow War".

Chapter 1, "Western Demands for Diplomatic Representation in Peking," focuses on the dispute regarding whether western countries should open diplomatic missions in Peking (now Beijing).

Chapter 2, "The Domestic Political Scene," discusses the nature of the Qing dynasty government. Since this, in 1964, was, in Eastman's words, "one of the few concerted efforts to analayze the sources and political nature" of said government, he described this as an "extraordinarily important" chapter.

Chapter 3, "The Conduct of Foreign Affairs Following the Tientsin Treaties," documents how the Qing made attempts to placate Western countries without having diplomats in Peking.

Chapter 4, "Sino-Russian Contact in Peking (1859-1860)," describes Russian Empire-Qing relations and how the Qing dealt with them in a manner different from other European powers.

Chapter 5, "Conduct of Peace Negotiations in Peking, Fall 1860," describes the developments pre-Peking Convention.

Chapter 6, "Developments Following the Peking Conventions," describes the developments post-Peking Convention. The Tsungli Yamen: Its Organization and Function by S. M. Meng is a major source used in this section, with most of the information from that book.

The final portion, describing the Zongli Yamen, is called "Epilogue". There is also a bibliography and glossary in the book's appendix.

== Reception ==
Eastman praised the "lucid while being detailed" work.

Leonard Gordon of the University of Wisconsin praised the "thoroughness, penetrating analysis, and the insight", as well as the "thorough explanations of significant episodes".

Wolfgang Franke praised the book stating it is "a most valuable new contribution" in its area.
