= Foreign relations of imperial China =

The foreign relations of Imperial China from the Qin dynasty until the Qing dynasty encompassed many situations as the fortunes of dynasties rose and fell. Chinese culture had influenced neighboring and distant countries, while being transformed by outside influences as well as being conquered. During the Western Han dynasty, the Silk Road trade routes were established and brought Hellenistic Central Asia, Persia under the Parthian Empire, and South Asia into contact with the Chinese empire. During the 2nd century BC, Zhang Qian became the first known Chinese diplomat to venture deep into Central Asia in search of allies against the Mongolic Xiongnu confederation. Han Chinese attempts were made at reaching the Roman Empire and although the mission led by Gan Ying in 97 AD was a failure, Chinese historical records nevertheless maintain that the Romans traveled to southern China and Vietnam via the Indian Ocean. Buddhism from India was introduced to China during the Eastern Han period and would spread to neighboring Vietnam, Korea, and Japan, all of which would adopt similar Confucian cultures based on the Chinese model.

Following the fall of Sasanian Persia to the Rashidun Caliphate, Chinese contacts with the Islamic world were initiated during the Tang dynasty. Foreign faiths entered China at this time, such as Zoroastrianism, Nestorian Christianity and Islam, although Chinese Buddhism and Taoism remained prominent. The Song dynasty dealt on a basis of equality with the neighboring Liao and Jin dynasties until falling to the Mongol conquest. The Mongol Empire became the dominant state in Asia, and the Pax Mongolica encouraged trade of goods, ideas, and technologies from east to west during the early and mid-13th century. Marco Polo could safely travel back and forth, for instance. The Mongol-led Yuan dynasty founded by Kublai Khan ruled from the capital of Khanbaliq (modern Beijing). The Yuan dynasty's failed diplomacy with the Kamakura Shogunate of Japan led to the Mongol invasions of Japan, which also ended in failure for the Yuan Empire.

Following the collapse of the Yuan dynasty and the formation of the Ming dynasty by the Hongwu Emperor in 1368, imperial Chinese power was projected abroad with the 15th-century Chinese treasure fleet of Admiral Zheng He. As representatives of the Yongle Emperor, Zheng's fleet sailed throughout Southeast Asia, the Indian Ocean and to East Africa exacting tribute, granting lavish gifts to vassal states, and even invaded Sri Lanka. However, the fleet was later dismantled and the Ming emperors thereafter fostered Haijin isolationist policies that limited international trade and foreign contacts to a handful of seaports and other locations. These policies saw a gradual reversal after the arrival of European explorers such as Jorge Álvares (the first foreigner to travel to China by sea) and Rafael Perestrello and, although a war was initially fought against the Portuguese Empire, the Portuguese were granted a colonial settlement at Macau in the 16th century. Catholic Jesuit missions in China were also introduced, with Matteo Ricci being the first European allowed to enter the Forbidden City of the Ming emperors in Beijing. During the subsequent Qing dynasty Jesuits from Europe such as Giuseppe Castiglione gained favor at court until the Chinese Rites controversy and most missionaries were expelled in 1706.

The dissolution of the Mongol empire in the fourteenth century made Central Asian trade routes dangerous and forced Western European powers to explore ocean routes. European powers, including the Portuguese, Spanish and Dutch began trading with China in the early 17th century. The Qing court moved to control this burgeoning trade with the Europeans by creating the Canton System in 1756, granting a monopoly of trade to the merchants of the Thirteen Factories and restricted it to Canton (as Guangzhou was then known) in the south. The British Macartney Embassy of 1793 failed to convince the Qianlong Emperor to open northern Chinese ports for foreign trade or establish direct relations. Britain's growing importation of Chinese goods such as tea was offset by their illicit sale of opium to Chinese smugglers. However, the Qing unilateral banning of the sale of opium led to the Opium Wars and Chinese defeat. The 1842 Treaty of Nanking replaced the Canton system with a series of treaty ports, ending the tributary system as well.

== Background ==
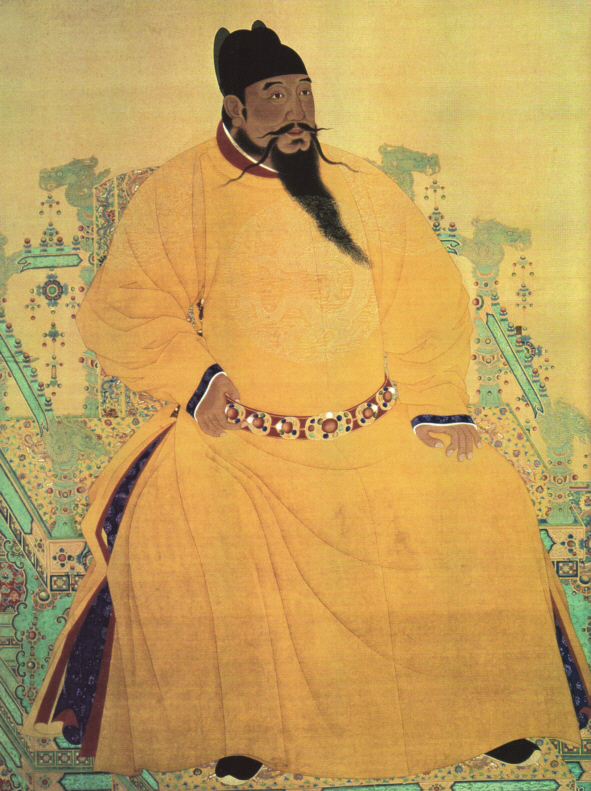
The Yongle Emperor (r. 1402–1424). During his reign, Admiral Zheng He led a gigantic maritime tributary fleet abroad on the seven treasure voyages.

In premodern times, the theory of foreign relations of China held that the Chinese Empire was the Celestial Dynasty, the center of world civilization, with the Emperor of China being the leader of the civilized world. This view saw China as equivalent to "all under heaven". All other states were considered to be tributaries, under the suzerain rule of China. Some were direct vassals. Theoretically, the lands around the imperial capital were regarded as "five zones of submission", - the circular areas differentiated according to the strength of the benevolent influence from the Son of Heaven.

There were several periods when Chinese foreign policy took on isolationist tones, because of the view that the rest of the world was poor and backward with little to offer.

Nevertheless, China was a center of trade from early on in its history. Many of China's interactions with the outside world came via the Silk Road. This included, during the 2nd century AD, contact with representatives of the Roman Empire, and during the 13th century, the visits of Venetian traveler Marco Polo.

Chinese foreign policy was usually aimed at containing the threat of so-called "barbarian" invaders (such as the Xiongnu, Mongols, and Jurchen) from the north. This could be done by military means, such as an active offense (campaigns into the north) or a more passive defense (as exemplified by the Great Wall of China). The Chinese also arranged marriage alliances known as heqin, or "peace marriages."

Chinese officers distinguished between "matured/familiar barbarians" (foreigners influenced by Chinese culture) and "raw barbarians".

In many periods, Chinese foreign policy was especially assertive. One such case was exemplified by the treasure voyages of Admiral Zheng He during the Ming dynasty.

== Qin dynasty ==
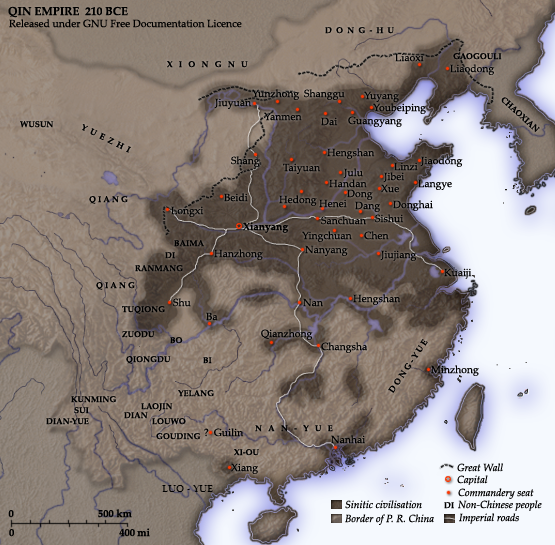
Boundaries of the Qin dynasty in 210 BC.

Although many kings of the Shang and Zhou dynasties ruled beforehand, in 221 BC, the ruler of the Qin state, Ying Zheng (Qin Shi Huang), was the first to conquer the different vassal states under the Zhou dynasty, as well as other non-sinicized states. He was able to transform these different states into a relatively unified and uniform empire, the Qin Empire. Under his leadership and a society modelled around strict adherence to legalist philosophy, his once backwater western frontier state conquered all of the rivaling Warring States in ancient China. The Chinese domain was also extended into Inner Mongolia and Manchuria to the north, and with naval expeditions sent to the south, the indigenous Baiyue of modern-day Guangdong and northern Vietnam (the latter called Jiaozhi, and then Annam during the Tang dynasty) were also quelled and brought under Chinese rule.

== Han dynasty ==
The time of the Han dynasty (202 BC–AD 220) was a groundbreaking era in the history of Imperial China's foreign relations, during the long reign of Emperor Wu of Han (r. 141–87 BC), the travels of the diplomat Zhang Qian opened up China's relations with many different Asian territories for the first time. While traveling to the Western Regions in order to seek out an alliance with the Yuezhi against the Xiongnu, Zhang Qian was imprisoned by the Xiongnu for many years, but he brought back detailed reports of lands that had been previously unknown to the Chinese. This included details of his travels to the Greek-Hellenized kingdoms of Fergana (Dayuan) and the Greco-Bactrian Kingdom (Daxia), as well as reports of Anxi (Persian Empire of Parthia), Tiaozhi (Mesopotamia), Shendu (India), and the Wusun Central Asian nomads. After his travels, the famous land trading route of the Silk Road leading from China to the Roman Empire was established. Emperor Wu was also known for his conquests and successful campaigns against the Xiongnu. He warred against the Kingdom of Wiman Joseon in order to establish the Four Commanderies of Han in Manchuria, one of which was established in northern Korea, the Lelang Commandery. The empire began expanding into southern China and northern Vietnam, then the territory of the Baiyue kingdoms. The Han Empire absorbed Minyue after defeating the state, and annexed the Dian in Yunnan. By 111 BC, Emperor Wu conquered the Nanyue kingdom in the Han–Nanyue War. Nanyue was ruled by the Triệu dynasty since the Qin naval officer Zhao Tuo had broken ties with mainland rule in the fall of Qin and establishment of Han.

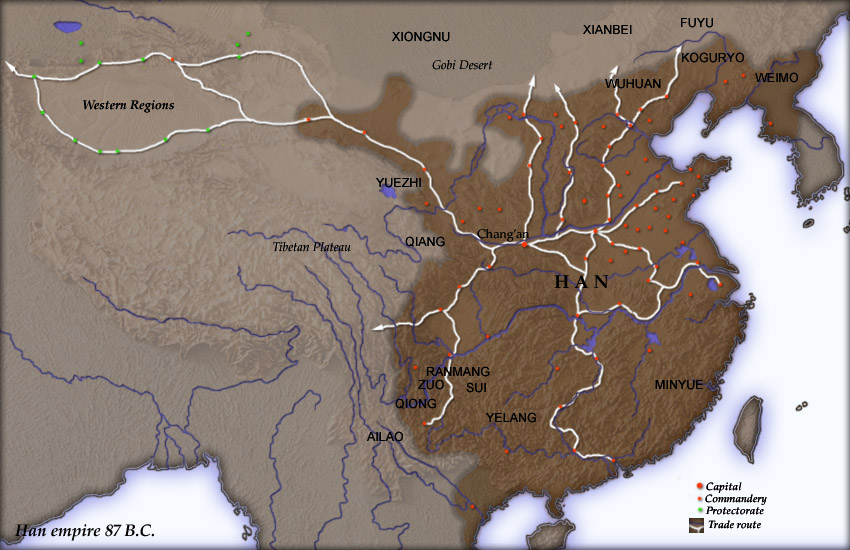
The Han dynasty in 87 BC, after the territorial expansion and establishment of the Silk Road during the reign of Emperor Wu.

Yet Chinese trading missions to follow were not limited to travelling across land and terrain. During the 2nd century BC, the Chinese had sailed past Southeast Asia and into the Indian Ocean, reaching India and Sri Lanka by sea before the Romans. This sea route became well traveled not only by merchants and diplomats, but also Chinese religious missionaries in search of further Indian Buddhist texts to translate from Sanskrit to Chinese. In AD 148, the Parthian prince known as An Shigao was the first to translate Buddhist scriptures into Chinese. There were many other Buddhist missionaries as well, including Yuezhi missionaries and Kushan Buddhist missionaries from northern India who introduced Buddhism to China. Emperor Ming establishing the White Horse Temple in the 1st century AD is demarcated by the 6th-century Chinese writer Yang Xuanzhi as the official introduction of Buddhism to China. Also by the 1st century AD, the Chinese made sea contacts with Yayoi Japan, inhabited by what the Chinese termed as the Wa people. By the 1st century, the Chinese also established relations with the Kingdom of Funan, centered in what is now Cambodia, but stretched partly into Burma, Laos, Thailand, and Vietnam.

The Han general Ban Chao (AD 32–102) reconquered the states in the Western Regions (the modern day Tarim Basin in Xinjiang) after pushing the Xiongnu out of the region. This included the kingdoms of Kashgar, Loulan, and Khotan, which were returned to Chinese control. He also sent his emissary Gan Ying even further in order to reach Rome (Daqin). Gan Ying made it as far as the Persian Gulf in the Parthian Empire, but was falsely convinced by Parthian hosts that Rome could only be reached by sailing around the Arabian peninsula. He did however bring back reports of the Roman Empire and its Mediterranean civilization to the Han royal court, and there is evidence that subsequent Roman embassies to China took place.

== Period of Disunity ==
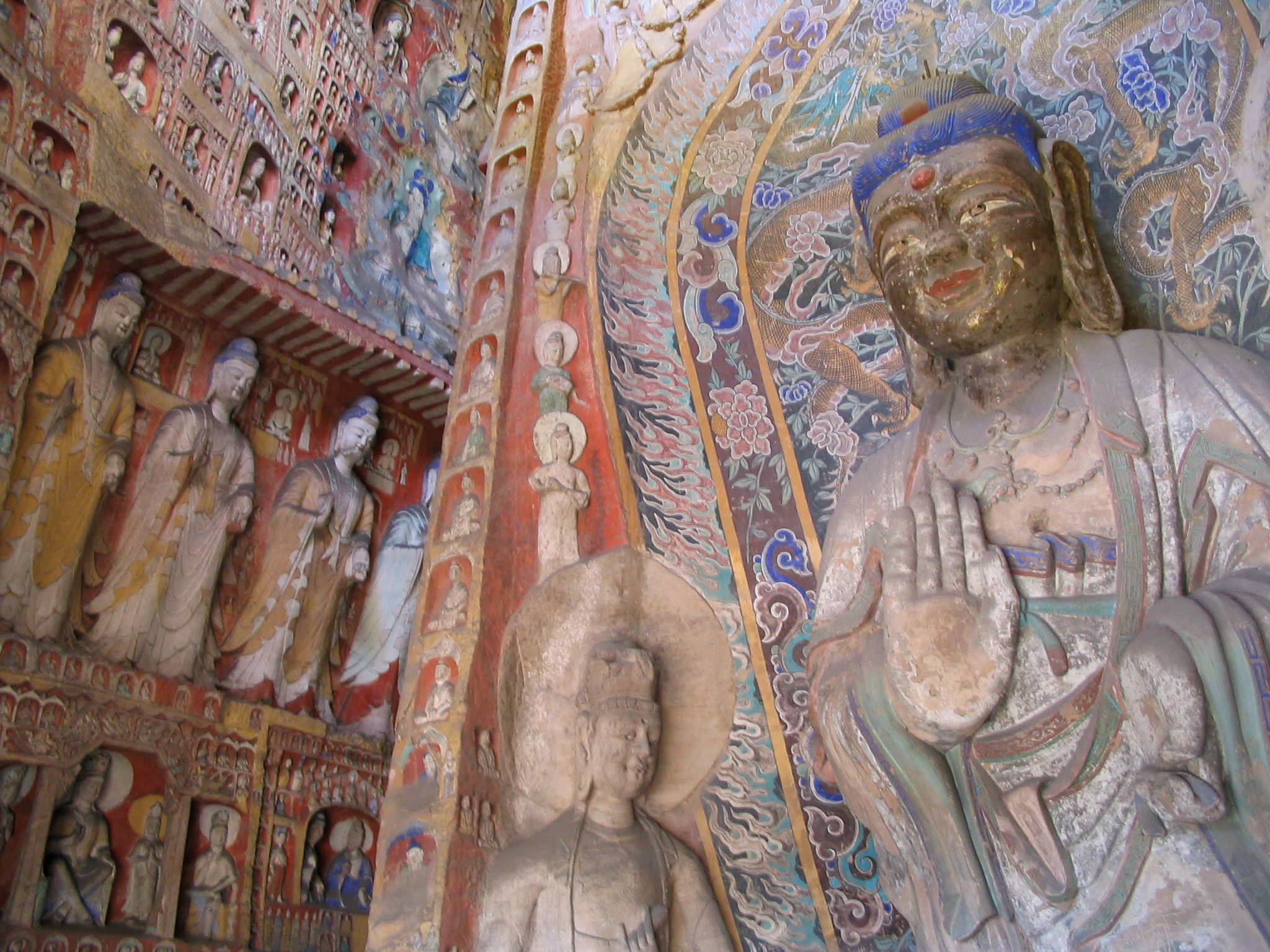
Statues of the Yungang Grottoes, one of many cultural symbols displaying China's embracement of Buddhism.

Although introduced during the Han dynasty, the chaotic, divisionary Period of Disunity (220–589) saw a flourishing of Buddhism and travels to foreign regions inspired by Buddhist missionaries. There were Indian monks such as Kumarajiva (344–413) from Kucha who traveled to China in order to translate Sanskrit texts into Chinese. There were also many Chinese who traveled abroad in order to obtain and translate Buddhist sutras into Chinese, such as the Chinese monk Faxian (337–422), who in his old age traveled to Sri Lanka, India, and Nepal. From China, Buddhism entered Korea by 372. It was first practiced in the northern state of Goguryeo, and would eventually develop into distinctive Korean Buddhism. As recorded in the Nihon Shoki, Buddhism in Japan was introduced by 552 with a religious mission sent by Seong of Baekje, ruler of one of the three Korean kingdoms.

=== Three Kingdoms ===
The Three Kingdoms era (220–280) was a period of Chinese history consumed by incessant warfare amongst a triad of rival claimants to the Han legacy. The triple schism of China into three warring states made engaging in costly conflict a necessity, so they could not heavily commit themselves to issues and concerns of traveling abroad. The state of Shu Han in the west conquered the Hmong people to the southwest, then known as the Nanman. There was another recorded Roman embassy to China that visited the court of Cao Rui (226–239) in the northern state of Cao Wei, most likely sent by Alexander Severus.

=== Jin dynasty ===
The Jin dynasty was established in 265 (after conquering Shu Han) by the noble Sima family that had once served the state of Cao Wei, and conquered the state of Eastern Wu in 280, thus ending the Three Kingdoms era. A Roman embassy was recorded in 284, most likely sent by Carus; this was the last Sino-Roman contact recorded by the Chinese. However, the state was weakened and left vulnerable with the War of the Eight Princes from 291 to 306. This allowed for sinicized Xiongnu nomads to capture both of China's historical capitals at Luoyang and Chang'an, forcing the remnants of the Jin court to flee south to Jiankang (present-day Nanjing). The Xiongnu then established rule in the north under the Han-Zhao kingdom. The Jin dynasty period saw a continuing flourishing of Buddhism and Buddhist travel.

=== Southern and Northern dynasties ===
Like the Three Kingdoms period before it, the Southern and Northern dynasties period (420–589), but also saw the flourishing of Buddhist sites along the Silk Road. This includes Buddhist sites such as the Yungang Grottoes, the Longmen Grottoes, and the Mogao Caves.

== Sui dynasty ==
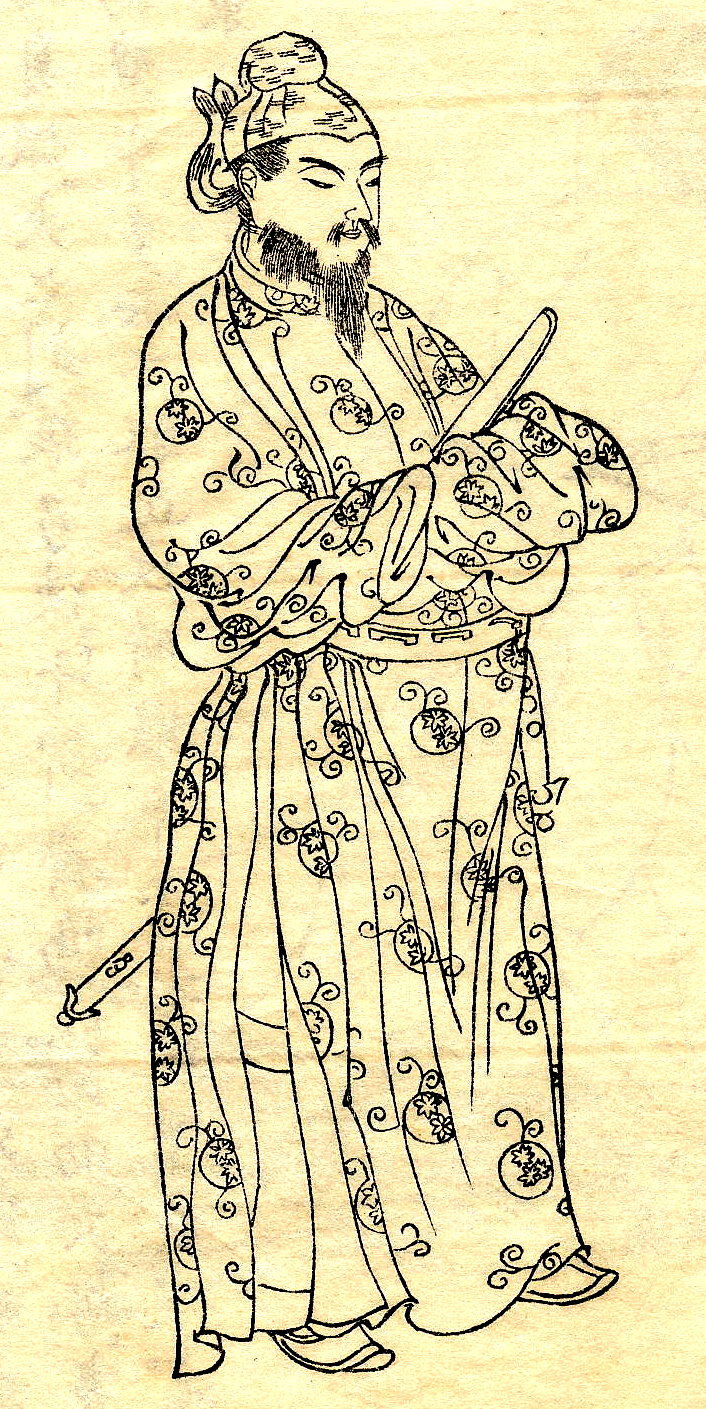
Prince Shōtoku (574–622) was a regent and a politician of the Imperial Court in Japan.

Yang Jian (Emperor Wen) ruled in northern China from 581, and conquered the Chen dynasty in the south by 589, hence reunifying China under the Sui dynasty (581–618). He and his successor Emperor Yang initiated several military campaigns.

Northern Vietnam was retaken by conquest, while there was a temporary occupation of the Champa kingdom in southern Vietnam. They launched unsuccessful campaigns against the northern Korean kingdom Goguryeo during the Three Kingdoms of Korea, depleting not only troops but ultimately much of the government's revenue.

The Grand Canal was completed during the Sui dynasty, enhancing indigenous trade between northern and southern China by canal and river traffic.

One of the diplomatic highlights of this short-lived dynastic period was Prince Shōtoku's Japanese embassy to China led by Ono no Imoko in AD 607.

Prince Shōtoku made his queen Suiko call herself Empress, and claimed an equal footing with the Chinese Emperor who regarded himself as the only Emperor in the world at that time. Thus Shōtoku broke with Chinese principle that a non-Chinese sovereign was only allowed to call himself king but not emperor.

Emperor Yang thought of this Japanese behavior as 'insolent', because it opposed his Sinocentric worldview, but finally, he had to accept it and send an embassy to Japan in the next year as he had to avoid conflict with Japan to prepare for the conquest of Goguryeo.

== Tang dynasty ==
The Tang dynasty (618–907) represents another high point for China in terms of its military might, conquest and establishment of vassals and tributaries, foreign trade, and its central political position and preeminent cultural status in East Asia.

One of the most ambitious rulers of the dynasty was Emperor Taizong (r. 626–649). He initiated several significant war campaigns in Chinese history, most of them against powerful Turkic groups of Central Asia. This includes campaigns against Eastern Tujue, Tuyuhun, and the Xueyantuo. Armies were dispatched to invade the oasis states of the Tarim Basin. The kingdom of Karasahr was captured by Tang forces in 644 and the kingdom of Kucha was conquered in 649. The western expansion of the Tang Empire continued under Emperor Taizong's successor, Emperor Gaozong, who conquered the Western Turks in 657, led by the Turkic qaghan Ashina Helu, with an army under the command of General Su Dingfang.

In a formidable alliance with the Korean kingdom Silla, a combined Tang-Silla fleet made a decisive victory over the Korean kingdom Baekje and her Yamato Japanese allies in the naval Battle of Baekgang in 663. Emperor Taizong also invaded Goguryeo in an effort to help their Unified Silla ally crush its rival, Goguryeo, to the north. Emperor Taizong's other intention in invading northern Korea was to secure territory of Lelang Commandery, an old Chinese commandery in northern Korea that had been lost since Goguryeo captured it from the Jin dynasty in the 313. However, Goguryeo's territory fell into the hands of Silla and Balhae instead of the Tang Empire.

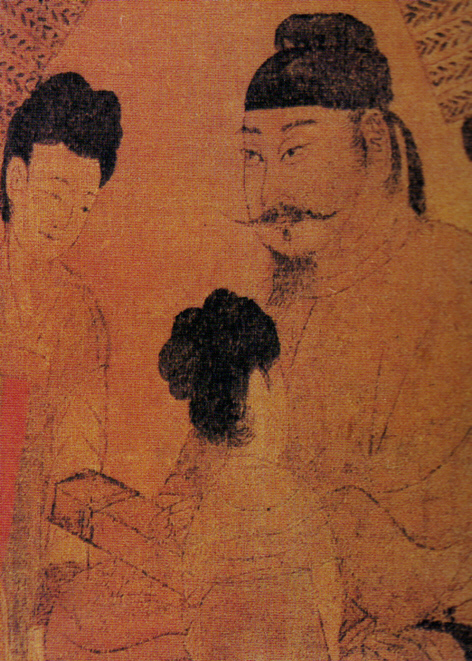
A painting portraying Emperor Taizong of the Tang dynasty by painter Yan Liben (c. 600–673).

Chinese trade relations during the Tang dynasty was extended further west to the Arabian Peninsula, East Africa, and Egypt. Many contemporary writers from foreign countries described Chinese ships, Chinese goods brought to foreign ports, as well as Chinese seaports. Amongst the Chinese authors, the writer Duan Chengshi (died 863) described trade in Somalia and between 785 and 805 the Chinese geographer Jia Dan described lighthouses that were erected in the Persian Gulf, confirmed later by Muslim writers al-Mas'udi and al-Muqaddasi. The introduction of Islam in China began during the reign of Emperor Gaozong (r. 649–683), with missionaries such as Sa'd ibn Abi Waqqas, a maternal uncle of Muhammad. The seaport at Guangzhou in southern China became one of the largest seaports in the world, hosting foreign travelers throughout maritime Asia. At the time, Guangzhou was a major port along the maritime silk road and involved in heavy trade with Japan. The Tang capital city of Chang'an became well known as a multicultural metropolis filled with foreign travelers, dignitaries, merchants, emissaries, and missionaries. Chinese Buddhist monks such as Xuanzang (died 664) continued to travel abroad to places like India in order to gain wisdom, collect Buddhist relics, and translate additional sutras into Chinese.

Although the reign of Emperor Xuanzong (r. 712–756) is seen as the zenith point of the Tang dynasty, it was during the last years of his reign that one of the most destructive rebellions in Chinese history occurred. The Tang Empire had recruited many Central Asian Turks into their armed forces. One of these was An Lushan (703–757), a Sogdian-Turk who became a military commander and personal favorite of Emperor Xuanzong's concubine Consort Yang. He instigated the An Lushan Rebellion, which caused the deaths of millions of people, cost the Tang dynasty their Central Asian possessions, and allowed the Tibetans to invade China and temporarily occupy the capital, Chang'an. The Tang dynasty recovered under Emperor Xianzong (805–820) but it never achieved its former martial and political strength. The unintended effect of the rebellion, however, was the loosening of government restrictions on trade. Although the 9th century was politically turbulent, the economy of China actually continued to thrive, bolstered still by foreign trade. The Japanese were sending embassies to the Tang Empire as late as 894, which was finally halted by Emperor Uda by the persuasion of Sugawara no Michizane.

== Five Dynasties and Ten Kingdoms ==
The Five Dynasties and Ten Kingdoms (907–960) period was an age of division and Chinese civil war between the unified Tang and Song dynasties. It is notable for the introduction of Greek Fire (or a formula similar to the original) from Chinese contacts in Arabia. Greek Fire was then applied to the new Chinese invention of the double-piston pump flamethrower, used in battle during the Five Dynasties era and Song dynasty.

== Song dynasty ==
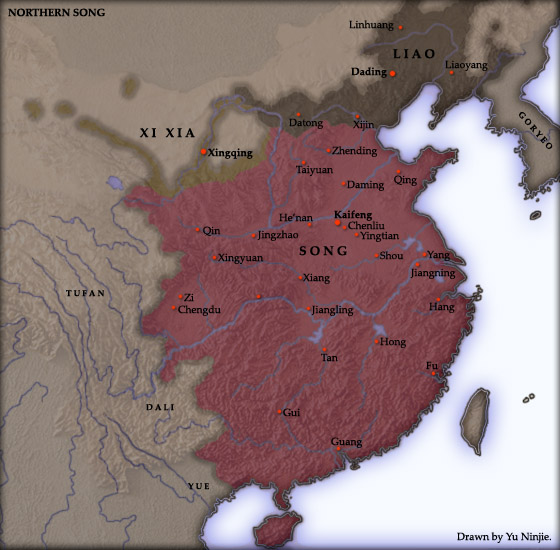
The Northern Song dynasty (960–1127), with neighboring Western Xia and Liao dynasties to the north.

The Chinese political theory of China being the center of world diplomacy was largely accepted in East Asia, except in periods of Chinese weakness such as the Song dynasty (960–1279).

During the Northern Song dynasty (960–1279), the Chinese emperors were forced to accept the emperors of the Khitan-led Liao dynasty, as their equals. After the Jurchen-led Jin dynasty toppled the Liao dynasty in a rebellion aided by the Song dynasty, they turned against Song and conquered northern China as far south as the Huai River in the Jin–Song Wars.

The imperial court of the Southern Song dynasty (1127–1279) was then forced to acknowledge the Jurchen rulers of the Jin dynasty as their superiors. The Mongols conquered the Jin dynasty in 1234 with the aid of the Song dynasty, which itself was also conquered by the Mongol-led Yuan dynasty under Kublai Khan by 1279.

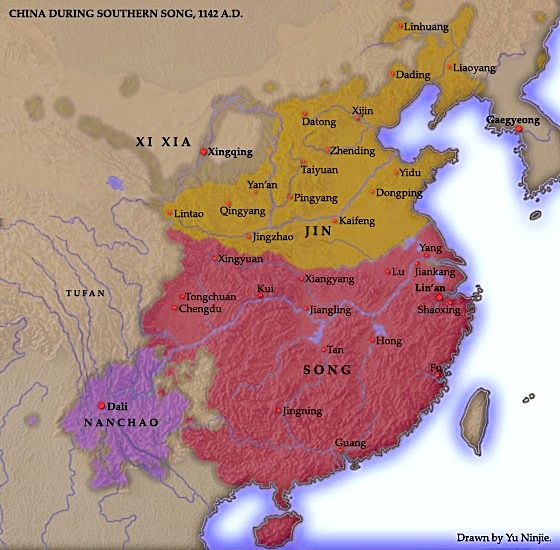
Southern Song dynasty (1127–1279) after the Jin dynasty's conquest of the north.

With powerful dynasties to its north such as the Tangut-led Western Xia, the Song dynasty was forced to engage in skillful diplomacy. The famous statesmen and scientists Shen Kuo (1031–1095) and Su Song (1020–1101) were both sent as Song ambassadors to the Liao dynasty in order to settle border disputes. Shen Kuo asserted the Song dynasty's rightful borders in the north by dredging up old archived court documents and signed agreements between the Song and Liao dynasties. Su Song asserted the Song dynasty's rightful borders in a similar way, only he used his extensive knowledge of cartography and maps to solve a heated border dispute.

Chinese maritime trade increased dramatically during the Song dynasty, with the bustling seaport at Quanzhou taking the lead. Maritime trade abroad was augmented by a booming shipbuilding industry in Fujian province. It was also enhanced by an economic revolution in Song China and the presence of many wealthy, willing investors of maritime trade missions. There were several notable diplomatic missions sent to China from foreign countries during the Song dynasty. This included the embassy of Al-Hakim bi-Amr Allah of Fatimid Egypt to the court of Emperor Zhenzong in 1008, as well as the embassy of Emperor Kulothunga Chola I of the Imperial Indian Chola dynasty to the court of Emperor Shenzong in 1077.

Although the golden age of Chinese Buddhism ended during the Tang dynasty, there were still influential Chinese Buddhist monks. This included the Zen Buddhist monk Wuzhun Shifan (1178–1249), who taught Japanese disciples such as Enni Ben'en (1201–1280). After returning to Japan from China, the latter contributed to the spread of Zen teaching in Japan and aided in the establishment of Tōfuku-ji.

== Yuan dynasty ==
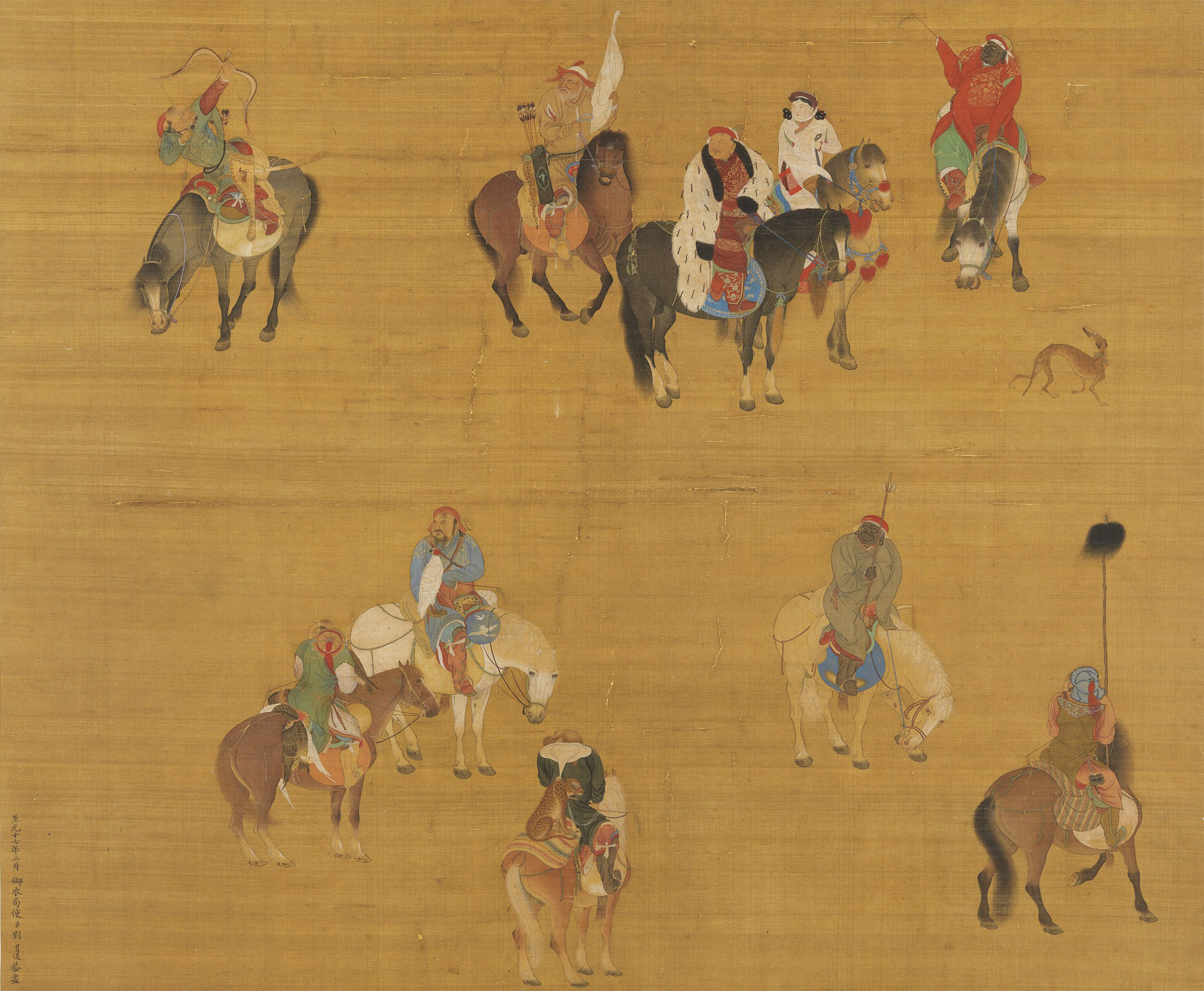
Painting of Kublai Khan on a hunting expedition, by artist Liu Guandao, c. 1280.

The Yuan dynasty (1271–1368) of China was the easternmost part of the vast Mongol Empire (stretching from East Asia to Eastern Europe), which became politically separated into four khanates beginning with the succession war in 1260. The Mongol leaders Genghis Khan, Ögedei Khan, Möngke Khan, and Hulagu Khan were able to conquer the Tangut-led Western Xia dynasty and the Jurchen-led Jin dynasty in northern China, as well as invading Korea under the Goryeo dynasty, turning it into a vassal state that was ruled indirectly. The Mongols withdrew after Korean monarchs agreed to move its capital back to the mainland from Ganghwa Island.

It was the Yuan founding emperor Kublai who finally conquered the Southern Song dynasty in 1279. Kublai was an ambitious leader who used ethnic Korean, Han, and Mongol troops to invade Japan on two separate occasions, yet both campaigns were ultimately failures.

The Yuan dynasty continued the maritime trading legacy of the Tang and Song dynasties. The Yuan ship captain known as Wang Dayuan (fl. 1328–1339) was the first from China to travel by sea through the Mediterranean upon his visit to Morocco in North Africa. One of the diplomatic highlights of this period was the Chinese embassy to the Khmer Empire under Indravarman III, led by the envoy Zhou Daguan (1266–1346) from the years 1296 to 1297. In his report to the Yuan court, Zhou Daguan described places such as Angkor Wat and everyday life of the Khmer Empire. It was during the early years of Kublai Khan's reign that Marco Polo (1254–1324) visited China, presumably as far as the previous Song capital at Hangzhou, which he described with a great deal of admiration for its scenic beauty.

== Ming dynasty ==
Travel of some of the envoys of the Yongle and Xuande emperors: Zheng He and Hong Bao (1405–1433, black), Yishiha (1412–1433, blue), Chen Cheng (1414–1420, green)

The Ming dynasty (1368–1644), after the Han and Tang dynasties, was another high point in Chinese power. The first Ming emperor, the Hongwu Emperor (r. 1368–1398), was the head of the Red Turban Rebellion when he routed the rival rebel Chinese leaders and then forced the Mongols of the Yuan dynasty to flee north, back into the Mongolian steppe. The Ming dynasty made a string of conflicts with the Mongols thereafter, some of which were successful, and others of which were not. An example of the latter would be the Tumu Crisis in 1449, where the Zhengtong Emperor was captured by the Mongols and not released until a year later.

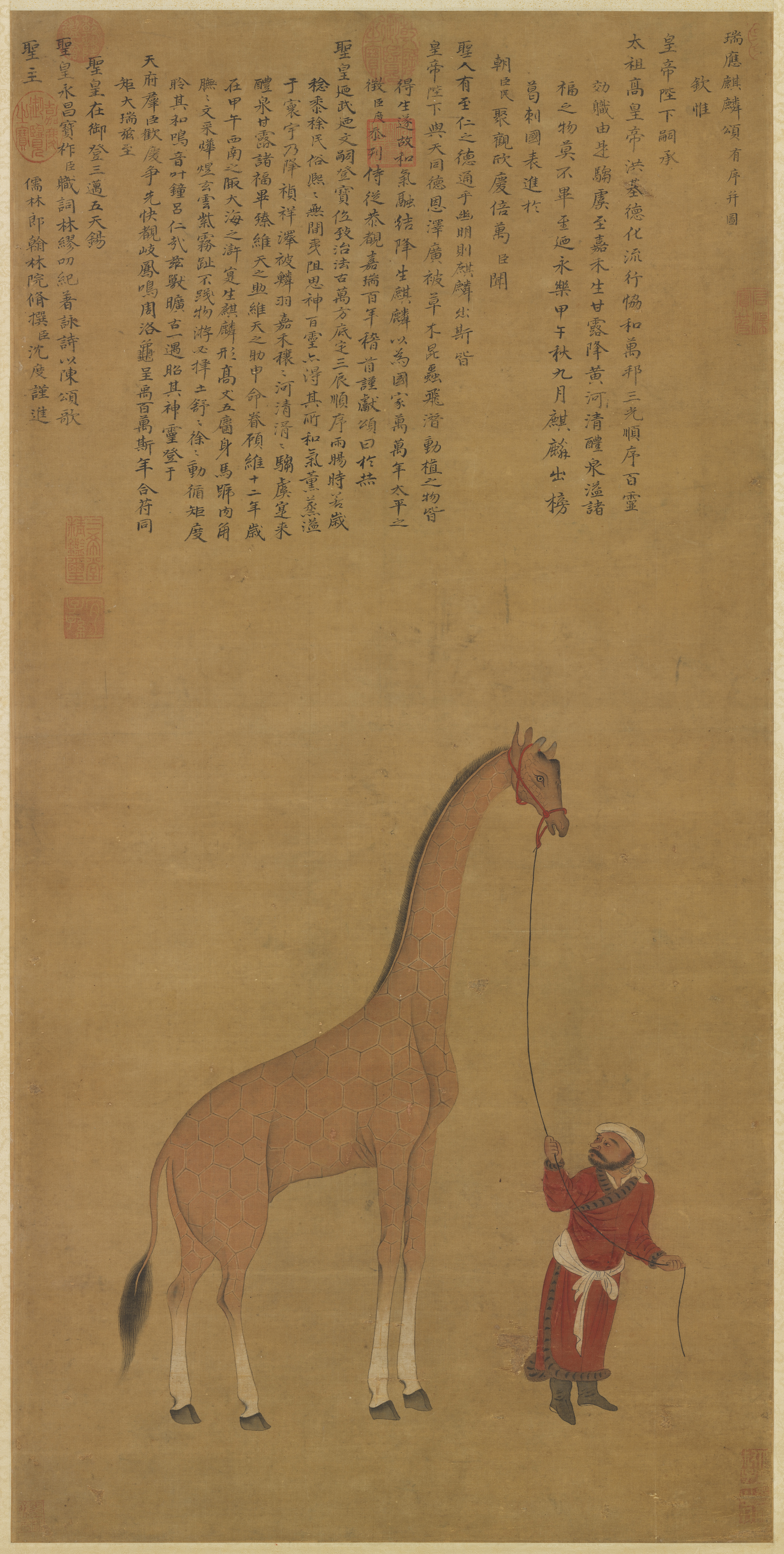
An exotic giraffe brought from Bengal in the twelfth year of Yongle (1414).

The Hongwu Emperor allowed foreign envoys to visit the capitals at Nanjing and Beijing, but enacted strict legal prohibitions of private maritime trade by Chinese merchants wishing to travel abroad. After the death of Timur, who intended to invade China, the relations between the Yongle Emperor's China and Shakhrukh's state in Persia and Transoxania state considerably improved. Both the Chinese envoy to Samarkand and Herat, Chen Cheng, and his opposite party, Ghiyāth al-dīn Naqqāsh, left detailed accounts of their visits to each other's country.

The greatest diplomatic highlights of the Ming period were the enormous maritime tributary missions and expeditions of the admiral Zheng He (1371–1433), a favored court eunuch of the Yongle Emperor (r. 1402–1424). Zheng He's missions docked at ports throughout much of the Asian world, including those in Borneo, the Malay state of the Malacca Sultanate, Sri Lanka, India, Persia, Arabia, and East Africa. Meanwhile, the Chinese under the Yongle Emperor invaded northern Vietnam in 1402, and remained there until 1428, when Lê Lợi led a successful native rebellion against the Chinese occupiers.

Large tributary missions such as these were halted after Zheng He, with periods of isolationism in the Ming dynasty, coupled with the need to defend China's large eastern coastal areas against marauding wokou pirates. Although it was severely limited by the state, trade was overall not forbidden. After 1578, it was completely liberalized. Upon their arrival in the early 16th century, the Portuguese Empire traded with the Chinese at Tamão, despite some hostilities exchanged between both sides. The Chinese also traded avidly with the Spanish, sending numerous trade ships annually to the Philippines in order to sell them Chinese goods in exchange for mita-mined silver from the New World colonies of Spain. There was so much Spanish silver entering China that the Spanish minted silver currency became commonplace in Ming China. The Chinese attempted to convert the silver currency back to copper currency, but the economic damage was done.

In 1524, Beijing was visited by representatives of the Ottoman Empire.

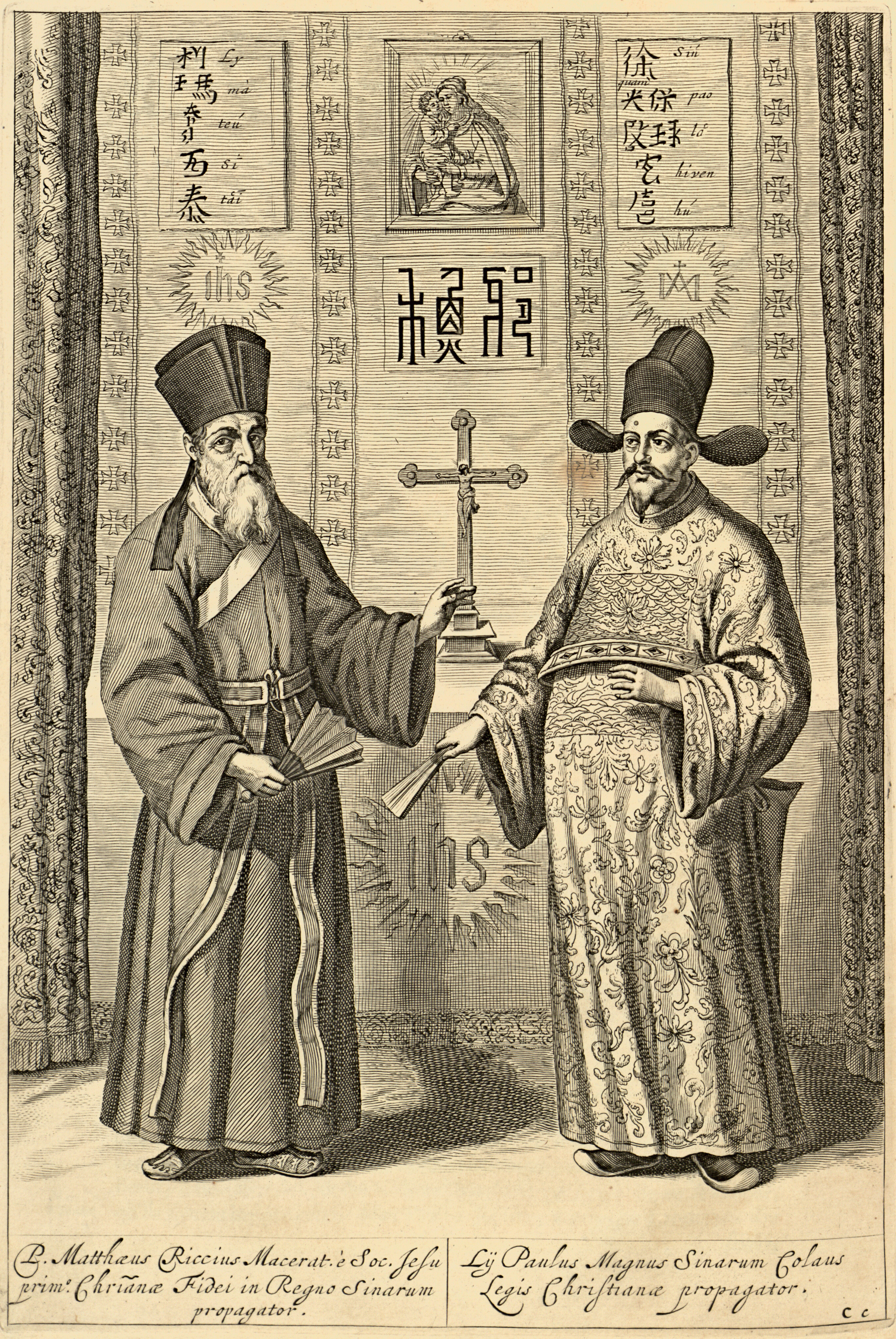
Matteo Ricci (left) and Xu Guangqi (right) in the Chinese edition of Euclid's Elements published in 1607.

Meanwhile, the Chinese under the Wanli Emperor (r. 1572–1620) became engaged in a somewhat costly war defending Joseon Korea against Japan. The Japanese regent Toyotomi Hideyoshi (1537–1598) and his predecessor Oda Nobunaga (1534–1582) brought about the prosperous Azuchi-Momoyama period in feudal Japan, putting an end to the turbulent era of the Sengoku period. However, the Japanese staged an enormous invasion of Korea from 1592 to 1598. The aim of the Japanese was to ultimately invade prosperous Ming China, but in order to do so it would need to use the Korean Peninsula as a staging ground. Throughout the war, though, the Ming forces suffered significant casualties, and had spent a great deal of revenue sending troops on land into Korea and bolstering the Korean navy in battles such as the Battle of Noryang Point. The Japanese were finally defeated and withdrew.

The decline of Ming China's economy by inflation was made worse by crop failure, famine, sudden plague, and agrarian rebellion led by those such as Li Zicheng (1606–1644), and the Ming dynasty fell in 1644. The Ming general Wu Sangui (1612–1678) was going to side with the rebels under Li, but felt betrayed when his concubine Chen Yuanyuan was taken by Li, and so allowed the Manchus, led by Prince Dorgon, to enter a northern pass and invade northern China from their base in Manchuria.

The first Jesuit missionaries to visit China did so during the Ming dynasty. The most prominent one was the Italian Jesuit Matteo Ricci (1552–1610). Matteo Ricci is famous in China and the West for many reasons. He was the first to translate the Chinese classic texts into a Western language (Latin), and the first to translate the name of the most prominent Chinese philosopher Kong Qiu as "Confucius". Along with another Jesuit father, he was the first European to enter the Forbidden City of Beijing during the reign of the Wanli Emperor. Matteo Ricci and his baptized Chinese colleague, the mathematician, astronomer, and agronomist Xu Guangqi (1562–1633), were the first to translate the ancient Greek mathematical treatise of Euclid's Elements into Chinese.

== Early Qing dynasty to 1800 ==
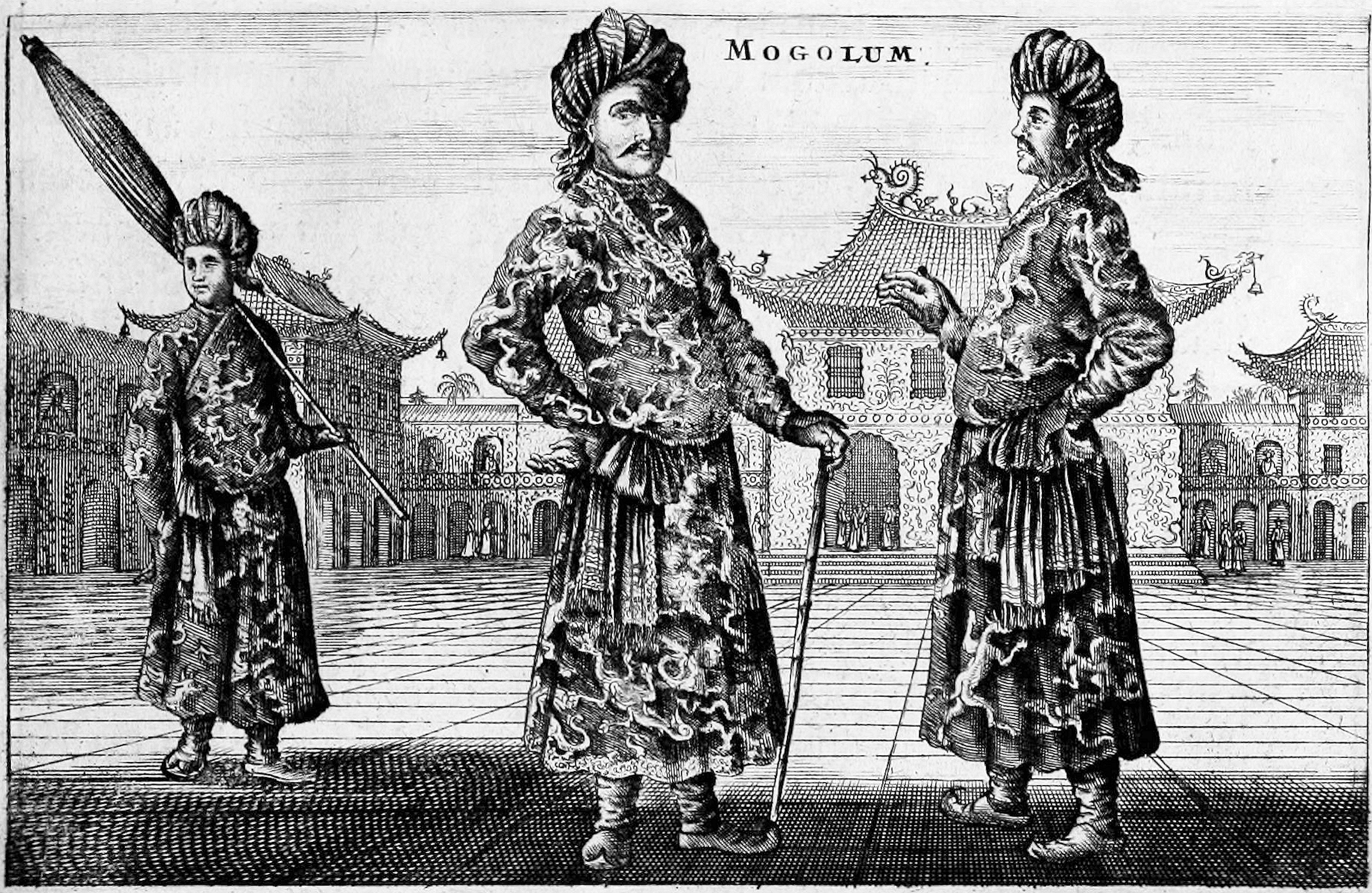
"Moghul embassy", seen by the Dutch visitors in Beijing in 1656. According to Lach & Kley (1993), modern historians (namely, Luciano Petech) think that the emissaries portrayed had actually come from Turfan (Moghulistan), and not all the way from Moghul India.

The long-lasting Chinese Rites controversy of the 17th and 18th centuries led the pope in 1704 to reverse the Jesuit position and reject any recognition of traditional Chinese rituals regarding ancestors and Confucianism. The Emperor thereupon banished all missionaries who followed the pope's policy. The pope's decision was finally reversed in 1939.

One issue facing Western embassies to China was the act of prostration known as the kowtow. Western diplomats understood that kowtowing meant accepting the superiority of the Emperor of China over their own monarchs, an act which they found unacceptable. In 1665, Russian explorers met the Manchus in what is today northeastern China. Using the common language of Latin, which the Chinese had learned from Jesuit missionaries, the Kangxi Emperor of China and Tsar Peter I of the Russian Empire negotiated the Treaty of Nerchinsk in 1689, which delineated the borders between Russia and China, some sections of which still exist today.

Russia was not dealt with through the Ministry of Tributary Affairs, but rather through the same ministry as the problematic Mongols, which served to acknowledge Russia's status as a nontributary nation. From then on, the Chinese worldview of all other nations as tributaries began to unravel.

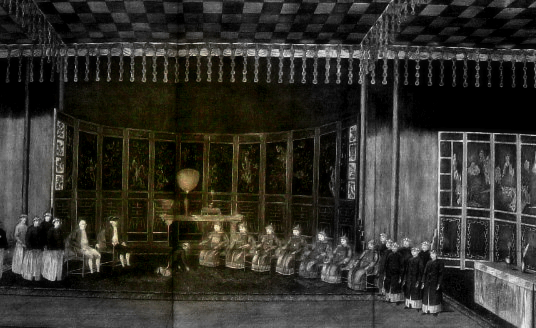
Illustration depicting the last European delegation to be received at the court of the Qianlong Emperor in 1795 — Isaac Titsingh (seated European with hat, far left) and A.E. van Braam Houckgeest (seated European without hat).

In 1793, the Qianlong Emperor rejected an offer of expanded trade and foreign relations by the British diplomat George Macartney. A Dutch embassy was the last occasion in which any European appeared before the Chinese imperial court within the context of traditional Chinese imperial foreign relations.

While maintaining foreign relations is crucial in safeguarding economic and political strength, the Imperial Court had little incentive to appease the European nations at the time. Evidenced in the book The Great Divergence by Professor Kenneth Pomeranz, the infrastructure surrounding China's economy was far more durable than its European counterparts. The capability for multiple Chinese markets to satisfy domestic needs and compete globally enabled independent innovation and development outside the European sphere of influence. Given the high quality of life, adequate sanitation, and a strong internal agricultural sector, the Chinese government had no significant motivation to satisfy any demands imposed by western powers.

Representing Dutch and Dutch East India Company interests, Isaac Titsingh traveled to Beijing in 1794–96 for celebrations marking the 60th anniversary of the Qianlong Emperor's reign. The Titsingh delegation also included the Dutch-American Andreas Everardus van Braam Houckgeest, whose detailed description of this embassy to the Chinese imperial court was soon after published in the United States and Europe. Titsingh's French translator, Chrétien-Louis-Joseph de Guignes published his own account of the Titsingh mission in 1808. Voyage a Pékin, Manille et l'Ile de France provided an alternate perspective and a counterpoint to other reports which were then circulating. Titsingh himself died before he could publish his version of events.

The Chinese worldview changed very little during the Qing dynasty as China's sinocentric perspectives continued to be informed and reinforced by deliberate policies and practices designed to minimize any evidence of its growing weakness and West's evolving power. After the Titsingh mission, no further non-Asian ambassadors were allowed even to approach the Qing capital until the consequences of the First and Second Opium Wars changed everything. For the later history see Foreign relations of China#History, List of diplomatic missions of the Qing dynasty, and Dates of establishment of diplomatic relations with the Qing dynasty.

== See also ==
- Official communications in imperial China
- Imperial Chinese tributary system
  - Portraits of Periodical Offering
  - List of tributaries of imperial China
- List of recipients of tribute from China
- Pax Sinica
- Adoption of Chinese literary culture
- History of the Great Wall of China
- Zongli Yamen
- China-Iran relations
- Sino-Roman relations
- China–Holy See relations
  - Chinese Rites controversy
