= St. Michael's Church, Beijing =

Church building in Beijing, China

Coordinates: 39.9016°N 116.4060°E

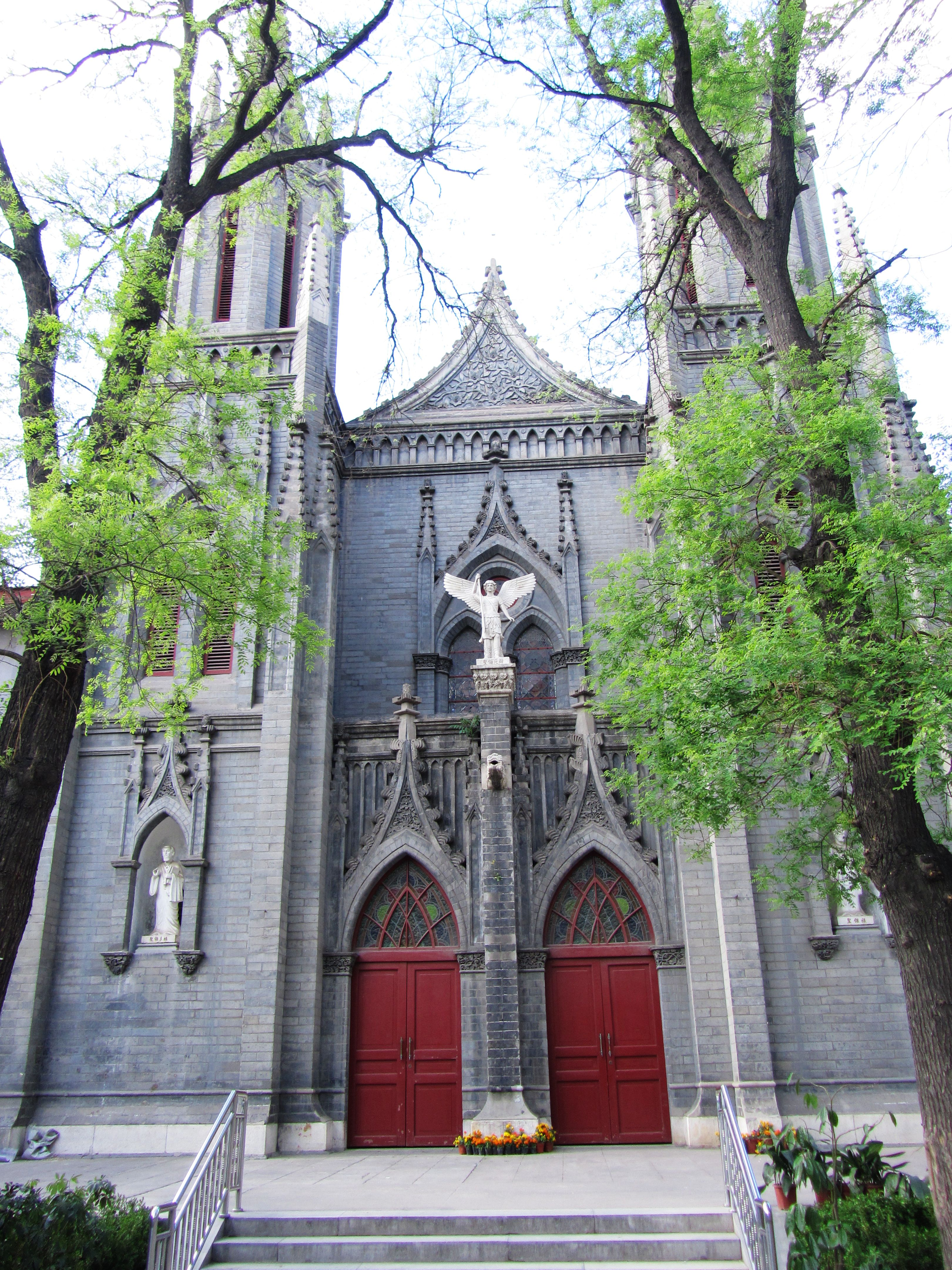
- Traditional Chinese: 聖彌厄爾教堂
- Simplified Chinese: 圣弥厄尔教堂
Transcriptions

Alternative Chinese name
- Chinese: 东交民巷天主堂
Transcriptions
Standard Mandarin
- Hanyu Pinyin: Donjiaoming Church

St. Michael's Church (French: Église Saint-Michel; traditional Chinese: 聖彌厄爾教堂; simplified Chinese: 圣弥厄尔教堂), also called Dongjiaoming Street Church (东交民巷天主堂), is a church that was formerly in the French Legation of Beijing. It was built in 1901.
