= Stent (surname) =

Stent is a surname. Notable people with the surname include:

- Peter Stent (c. 1642 – 1665), London printmaker and seller
- Charles Stent (1807–1885), English dentist for whom the medical stent is named
- George Carter Stent (1833–1884), English soldier and translator of Chinese texts
- Sydney Margaret Stent (1875–1942), South African botanist
- Gunther Stent (1924–2008), German-American molecular geneticist
- Angela Stent (born 1947), American foreign-affairs educator
- Mark Stent (born 1965), British record producer, engineer, and mixer a.k.a. "Spike" Stent
- Brynley Stent (born 1989), New Zealand actor, scriptwriter and comedian
