= Dates of establishment of diplomatic relations with the Qing dynasty =

While the Qing dynasty of China tried to maintain the traditional tributary system of China, by the 19th century Qing China had become part of a European-style community of sovereign states and had established official diplomatic relations with over twenty countries around the world before its downfall in 1912. It also established legations and consulates known as the "Chinese Legation", "Imperial Consulate of China", "Imperial Chinese Consulate (General)" or similar names in seventeen countries since the 1870s.

== List of diplomatic relations ==
=== Europe ===
Country	Date of establishment
United Kingdom	August 29, 1842
France	October 24, 1844
Sweden	March 20, 1847
Norway	March 20, 1847
Russia	June 13, 1858
Germany	September 2, 1861
Portugal	August 13, 1862
Denmark	July 13, 1863
Netherlands	October 6, 1863
Spain	October 10, 1864
Belgium	November 2, 1865
Italy	October 26, 1866
Austria-Hungary	September 2, 1869

=== Americas ===
Country	Date of establishment
United States	July 3, 1844
Peru	June 26, 1874
Brazil	October 3, 1881
Mexico	December 14, 1899
Cuba	September 16, 1902
Canada	January 9, 1909
Panama	January 16, 1910

=== Asia ===
Country	Date of establishment
Japan	September 13, 1871
Korea	September 11, 1899

=== Africa ===
Country	Date of establishment
Cape Colony	November 4, 1904

=== Oceania ===
Country	Date of establishment
Australia	May 21, 1908
New Zealand	May 21, 1908

== See also ==
- List of diplomatic missions of the Qing dynasty
- Foreign relations of imperial China
- Foreign relations of the Qing dynasty
- Peking Legation Quarter
- Zongli Yamen
