= Official communications in imperial China =

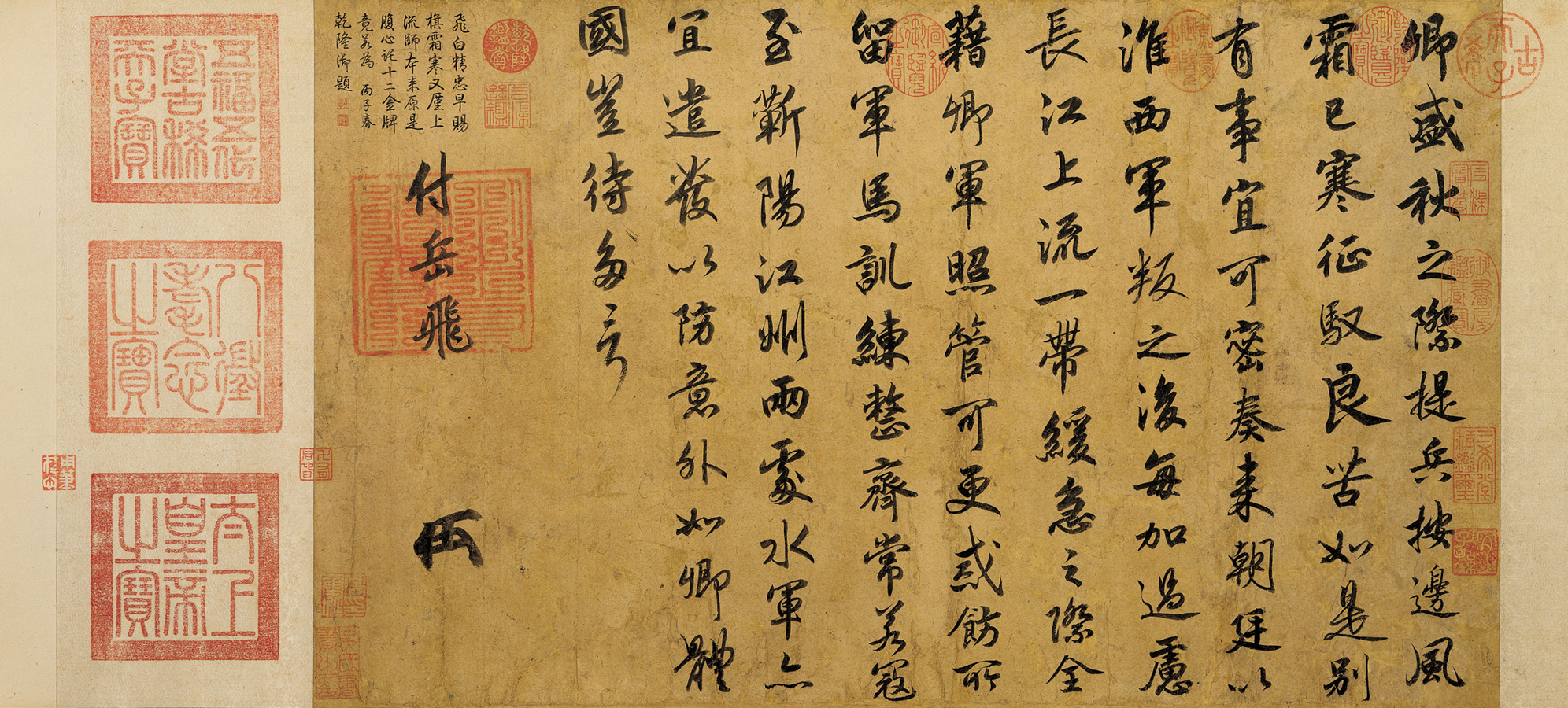
Emperor Gaozong's imperial decree to General Yue Fei, Song dynasty (National Palace Museum)

Official communications in imperial China, the era which lasted from the 221 BC until AD 1912, required predictable forms and means. Documents flowed down from the emperor to officials, from officials to the emperor, from one part of the bureaucracy to others, and from the emperor or his officials to the people. These documents, especially memorials to the throne, were preserved in collections which became more voluminous with each passing dynasty and make the Chinese historical record extraordinarily rich.

This article briefly describes the major forms and types of communication going up to and down from the emperor.

== Edicts, orders, and proclamations to the people ==
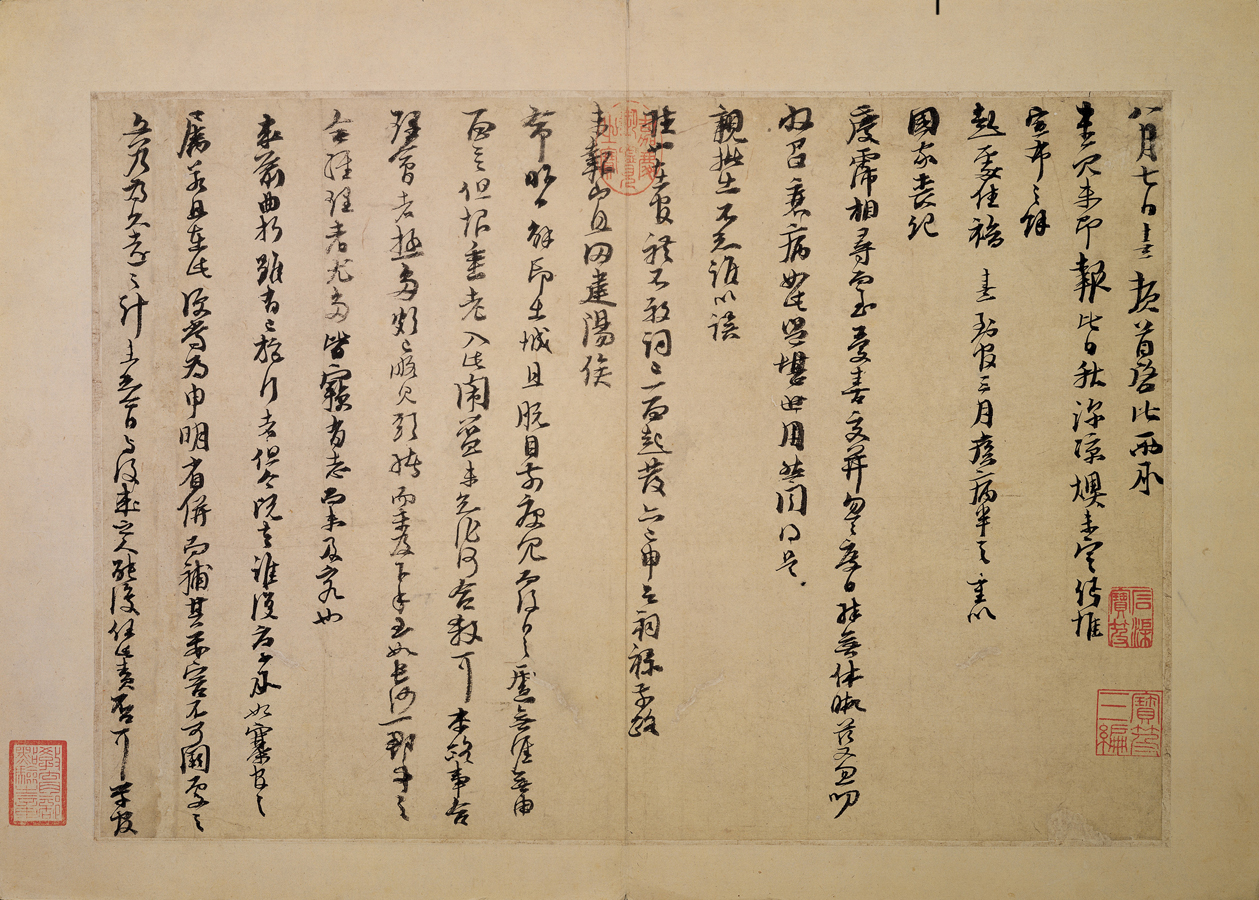
Zhu Xi's letter (1194) instructing a subordinate official on local government matters after he stepped down as Administrator of Tanzhou for reappointment at the imperial court

Under Chinese law, the emperor's edicts had the force of law. By the time the Han dynasty established the basic patterns of bureaucracy, edicts or commands could be issued either by the emperor or in the emperor's name by the proper official or unit of the government. Important edicts were carved on stone tablets for public inspection. One modern scholar counted more than 175 different terms for top down commands, orders, edicts, and such.

Edicts formed a recognized category of prose writing. The Qing dynasty scholar Yao Nai ranked "Edicts and orders" (Zhao-ling) as one of the thirteen categories of prose writing, citing prototypes which went back to the Zhou dynasty and the Book of History. Han dynasty edicts, sometimes actually written by high officials in the name of the emperor, were known for their literary quality. In later dynasties, both emperors and officials who wrote in the emperor's name published collections of edicts.

The history of China features a range of famous edicts and instructions. Here are examples in chronological order:

- An edict issued in 213 BC by Qin Shi Huang of the Qin dynasty ordered the burning of books and burying of scholars.
- The Edict on the Proclamation of the Dynastic Name (建國號詔) issued in 1271 by Emperor Shizu of the Yuan dynasty promulgated the official dynastic name of "Great Yuan", officially established the Yuan dynasty as a Chinese dynasty, and explicitly claimed political succession from the Three Sovereigns and Five Emperors to the Tang dynasty.
- The Hongwu Emperor of the Ming dynasty issued a series of Great Warnings (御製大誥) which informed his people and his bureaucracy of their failings and his instructions to correct them.
- Also issued by the Hongwu Emperor, the Instructions of the Ancestor was effectively an edict directed at his descendants.
- The Hongwu Emperor also issued the Six Maxims (聖諭六言) which instructed his subjects:

Treat your parents with piety; respect your elders and superiors; live at peace in your villages; instruct your children and grandchildren; make your living peacefully; commit no wrong.

- The Kangxi Emperor of the Qing dynasty issued the Sacred Edict in 1670 to educate his subjects on Confucian principles. This was to be posted in every village and read periodically to the assembled population. The edict was later expanded upon by the Yongzheng Emperor in 1724 and distributed in Chinese, Manchu and Mongolian languages.
- The Qianlong Emperor issued an edict to George III of the United Kingdom in 1793 instructing him that England had nothing of value to offer.

== Memorials ==
A memorial, most commonly zouyi, was the most important form of document sent by an official to the emperor. In the early dynasties, the terms and formats of the memorial were fluid, but by the Ming dynasty, codes and statutes specified what terminology could be used by what level of official in what particular type of document dealing with what particular type of problem. Criminal codes specified punishments for mistranscriptions or using a character that was forbidden because it was used in one of the emperor's names. The emperor might reply at length, perhaps dictating a rescript in response. More often he made a notation in the margin in vermilion ink (which only the emperor could use) stating his wishes. Or he might simply write "forward to the proper ministry," "noted," or use his brush to make a circle, the equivalent of a checkmark, to indicate that he had read the document.

In 1370, the Hongwu emperor established an office to organize the flow of memorials, which could come from both officials and commoners, and this became the Office of Transmission (Tongzheng si). The staff copied each memorial received, and forwarded the original to the emperor. The emperor once severely scolded a director of the office for failing to report several memorials: "Stability depends on superior and inferior communicating; there is none when they do not. From ancient times, many a state has fallen because a ruler did not know the affairs of the people."

By the height of the Qing dynasty in the 18th century, memorials from bureaucrats at the central, provincial, and county level supplied the emperors (and modern historians) with personnel evaluations, crop reports, prices in local markets, weather predictions, intelligence on social affairs, and any other matter of possible interest.

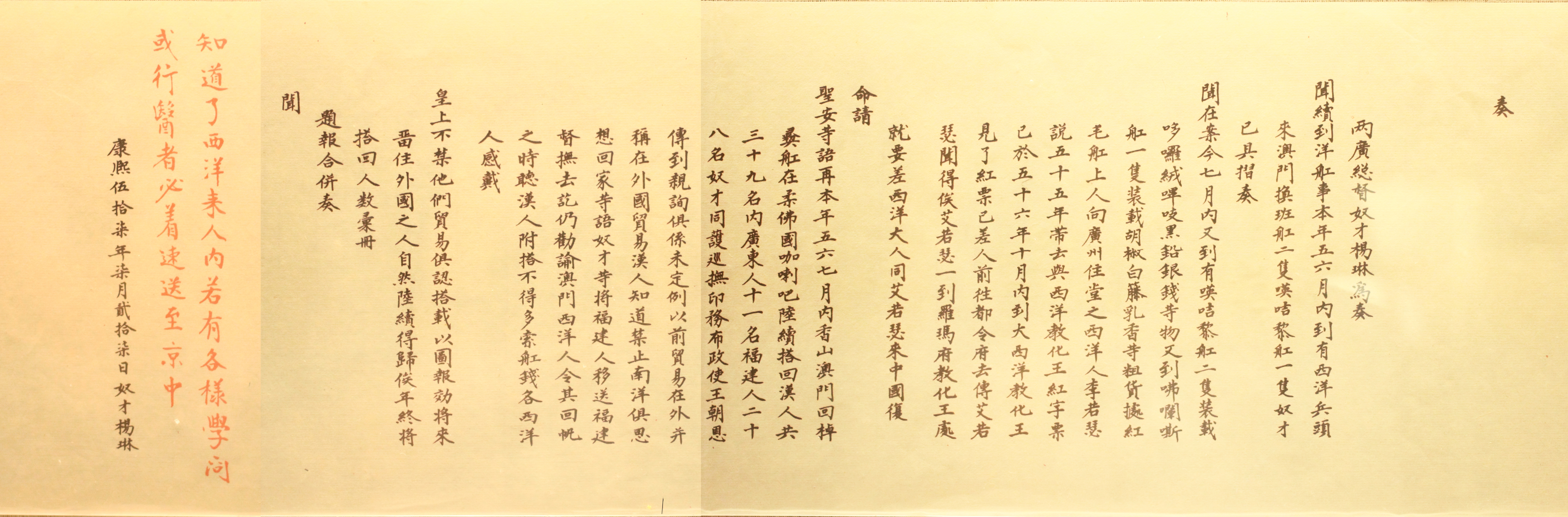
Folding memorial from an official to the Kangxi Emperor

Memorials were transported by government couriers and then copied and summarized by the Grand Secretariat, which itself had been perfected in the preceding Ming dynasty. They would be copied by clerks and entered into official registers.

This bureaucracy saved the emperor from being swamped with tedious detail but might also shield him from information which he needed to know. The Kangxi Emperor (r. 1672–1722), the Yongzheng Emperor (r. 1722–1735), and the Qianlong Emperor (r. 1735–1796) therefore developed a supplementary system of "Palace Memorials" (zouzhe) which they instructed local officials to send directly, without passing through bureaucratic filters. One type, the "Folding Memorial," was written on a page small enough for the emperor to hold in his hand and read without being observed. The Yongzheng Emperor, who preferred the written system over audiences, increased the use of these palace memorials by more than ten times over his father. He found he could get quick responses to emergency requests instead of waiting for the formal report, or give frank instructions: Of one official he said, "he is good-hearted, hard-working old hand. I think he's very good. But he's a bit coarse... just like Zhao Xiangkui, except that Zhao is intelligent." Likewise a provincial governor could frankly report that a subordinate was "scatter brained." The emperor could then instruct the official to also submit a routine memorial. Most important, bypassing the regular bureaucracy made it easier for the emperor to have his own way without being restricted by the regulations of the administrative code.

The system of memorials and rescripts, even more than personal audiences, was the emperor's way to shape and cement relations with his officials. Memorials could be quite specific and even personal, since the emperor knew many of his officials quite well. The Kangxi Emperor, for instance, wrote one of his generals:

"I am fine. It is cool now outside the passes. There has been enough rain so the food now is very good... You're an old man -- are grandfather and grandmother both well?"

But sometimes impatience broke through: "Stop the incessant sending of these greetings!" or "I hear tell you've been drinking. If after receiving my edict you are not able to refrain, and so turn your back on my generosity, I will no longer value you or your services." The historian Jonathan Spence translated and joined together memorials of the Kangxi Emperor to form an autobiographical "self-portrait" which gives an feel for the emperor's place in the flow of government.

== See also ==
- Foreign relations of imperial China
- List of diplomatic missions of the Qing dynasty
