= Stint (disambiguation) =

A stint is a small wader in the bird genus Calidris.

Stint may also refer to:

- Northern shoveler, a species of duck
- Stint (producer), a Canadian music producer
- Stint (electric cart), a type of four-wheeled electrically-powered cargo bike used in the Netherlands, see Oss rail accident
- Stint, a limit on the number of animals allowed on a stinted pasture
- Stint, a term in motor racing; see Glossary of motorsport terms#S

== See also ==
- Stent (disambiguation)
