= List of diplomatic missions of the Qing dynasty =

While the Qing dynasty of China tried to maintain the traditional tributary system of China, by the 19th century Qing China had become part of a European-style community of sovereign states and had established official diplomatic relations with more than twenty countries around the world before its downfall, and since the 1870s it established legations and consulates known as the "Chinese Legation", "Imperial Consulate of China", "Imperial Chinese Consulate (General)" or similar names in seventeen countries, namely the Austria-Hungary, Belgium, Brazil, Cuba, France, Germany, Italy, Japan, Mexico, Netherlands, Panama, Peru, Portugal, Russia, Spain, United Kingdom (or the British Empire) and the United States.

== Background ==
Anson Burlingame, a representative of the United States, was requested to take two Qing officials to the United States and Europe in 1867 when the Qing government chose to send China's first diplomatic mission to the Western countries to renegotiate its treaties. However, because Burlingame died in Russia before the mission's conclusion, the agreements he negotiated and signed were never completely put into effect.

The Margary incident accelerated the dispatch of Chinese diplomatic representatives to other countries. British envoy Thomas Francis Wade urged that Qing China send a diplomat to England to issue an official apology. In a petition presented to the imperial court in August 1875, the Zongli Yamen stated: "Diplomatic practice dictates that China send diplomats abroad. Thomas Wade urges that we dispatch diplomats to England in light of Margary's passing. We feel it would be foolish to refuse his demand since it might cause additional agitation in order to preserve our relationship and good faith and after considerable deliberation". The officials Guo Songtao and Xu Qian were appointed as the Qing emperor's ambassador and vice-envoy to the United Kingdom in a subsequent imperial decree.

== Overview ==
In 1877 the first permanent Chinese diplomatic mission opened in London as the Chinese Legation, followed by permanent diplomatic missions in other countries. By 1880 the Qing government had already built embassies in eight of the main capitalist nations or great powers in the world and dispatched 19 envoys or consuls, some of whom held several roles. This period of Qing diplomacy was the foundation upon which the Qing dynasty system of diplomats residing abroad would be established before the end of the dynasty. Qing China also established imperial consulates in places like Singapore and Luzon which were then under the British or Spanish rule. After the fall of the Qing dynasty in 1912 the Republic of China (which became recognized as the legitimate government of China) took over the buildings from the Qing government.

== Permanent diplomatic missions ==
=== Asia ===
- Japan (1876–1912)

=== Europe ===
- Austria-Hungary (1881–1912)
- Belgium (1885–1912)
- France (1878–1912)
- Germany (1877–1912)
- Italy (1881–1912)
- Netherlands (1881–1912)
- Portugal (1905–1912)
- Russia (1878–1912)
- Spain (1875–1912)
- United Kingdom (1875–1912)

=== North America ===
- Cuba (1879–1912)
- Mexico (1903–1912)
- Panama (1910–1912)
- United States (1875–1912)

=== South America ===
- Brazil (1909–1912)
- Peru (1875–1912)

== See also ==
- Dates of establishment of diplomatic relations with the Qing dynasty
- Imperial Chinese missions to the Ryukyu Kingdom
- Official communications in imperial China
- Foreign relations of imperial China
- Foreign relations of the Qing dynasty
- Peking Legation Quarter
- Zongli Yamen
