= George Carter Stent =

George Carter Stent (1833–1884) was an English soldier in India and China, an agent of the Chinese Imperial Maritime Customs Service, and a translator of Chinese texts into English.

== Life ==
George Carter Stent was born into a family of modest means in Canterbury in 1833. He was the second son of James Stent, of 2 King's Bridge, Canterbury. Shortly after his twentieth birthday he joined the British Army as a soldier of the 14th (King's Light) Dragoons and proceeded with the regiment to India, where in the 1850s he witnessed and later wrote about the Great Mutiny. By the mid-1860s, he was in China, serving in the guard of the British legation at Peking. He displayed an affinity for Chinese literature, and with the help of Thomas Francis Wade was recruited into the Maritime Customs Service. He died on 1 September 1884, at Takaw (Kaohsiung), China.

== Works ==
- Scraps from my Sabretasche: Being Personal Adventures While in the 14th (King's Light) Dragoons (London: W.H. Allen & Co.).
- Chinese and English Vocabulary in the Pekinese Dialect (Shanghai: Customs Press, 1871).
- Chinese and English Pocket Dictionary (Shanghai: Kelly & Co., 1874).
- The Jade Chaplet, in Twenty-Four Beads (London: London by Trübner & Co., 1874), a collection of songs, ballads, &c., from the Chinese.
- Entombed Alive, and Other Poems (William H. Allen & Co., 1878), from the Chinese.

== See also ==
- Royal Asiatic Society of Great Britain and Ireland

== Bibliography ==
- Idema, Wilt L. (2017). "George Carter Stent (1833–1884) as a Translator of Traditional Chinese Popular Literature". Chinese Literature: Essays, Articles, Reviews. 39: 119–33. JSTOR 45014213.
- MacKay, Lynn (2023). "3. Life Abroad". Women and the British Army, 1815–1880. Boydell & Brewer. pp. 112–155. doi:10.2307/j.ctv37kck66.8.
- "Literary Notices". Supplement to the Hampshire Telegraph and Sussex Chronicle. 24 May 1884. p. 12.
- "Notes of the Quarter (March, April, May)". Journal of the Royal Asiatic Society of Great Britain and Ireland. 19 (3): 500–51. 1887. JSTOR 25208873.
