= Zongli Yamen =

Late-Qing dynasty foreign policy office

- Traditional Chinese: 總理衙門
- Simplified Chinese: 总理衙门
Transcriptions
Standard Mandarin
- Hanyu Pinyin: Zǒnglǐ Yámén
- Wade–Giles: Tsung^{3}-li^{3} Ya^{2}-men^{2}

Office for the General Management of Affairs Concerning the Various Countries
- Traditional Chinese: 總理各國事務衙門
- Simplified Chinese: 总理各国事务衙门
Transcriptions
Standard Mandarin
- Hanyu Pinyin: Zǒnglǐ Gèguó Shìwù Yámen

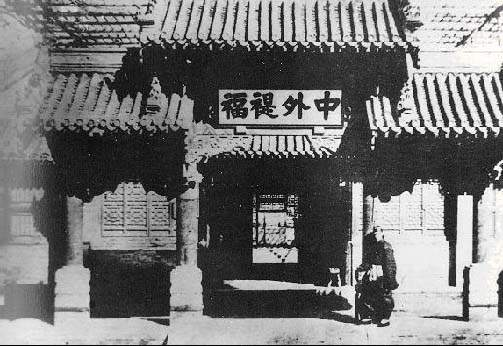
Front gate of the Zongli Yamen. The tablet reads "中外禔福" (Peace and Prosperity in China and Outside), from the biography of Sima Xiangru in the Book of Han. Photography c. 1897–98 Marcel Monnier, le Tour d'Asie, Plon 1899

The Zongli Yamen (Chinese: 總理衙門), short for Office for the General Management of Affairs Concerning the Various Countries (總理各國事務衙門), also known as Prime Minister's Office, Office of General Management, was the government body in charge of foreign policy in imperial China during the late Qing dynasty. It was established by Prince Gong on 11 March 1861 after the Convention of Beijing. It was abolished by the Qing government in 1901 and replaced with a Foreign Office of ministry rank.

== Meaning of name ==
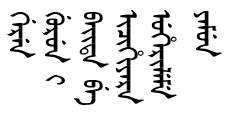
Zongli Yamen is a traditional abbreviation of the official name (總理各國事務衙門; 总理各国事務衙门; Zǒnglǐ Gèguó Shìwù Yámén), literally meaning "Office in Charge of Affairs Concerning All Nations". The corresponding name in Manchu, the other official language of the Qing Empire, was Geren gurun i baita be uherileme icihiyara yamun. ( ) A common misconception is that the Zongli Yamen's name means the "Premier's Office". This arose because the term zongli (总理) is now used in Chinese to refer to the Premier or Prime Minister of a country. In fact, the name Zongli Yamen is an abbreviation of its full name, which makes it the bona fide office of foreign affairs. In contemporary English sources, it was also called the "Board of Ministers for Foreign Affairs".

== Function in the Qing government ==
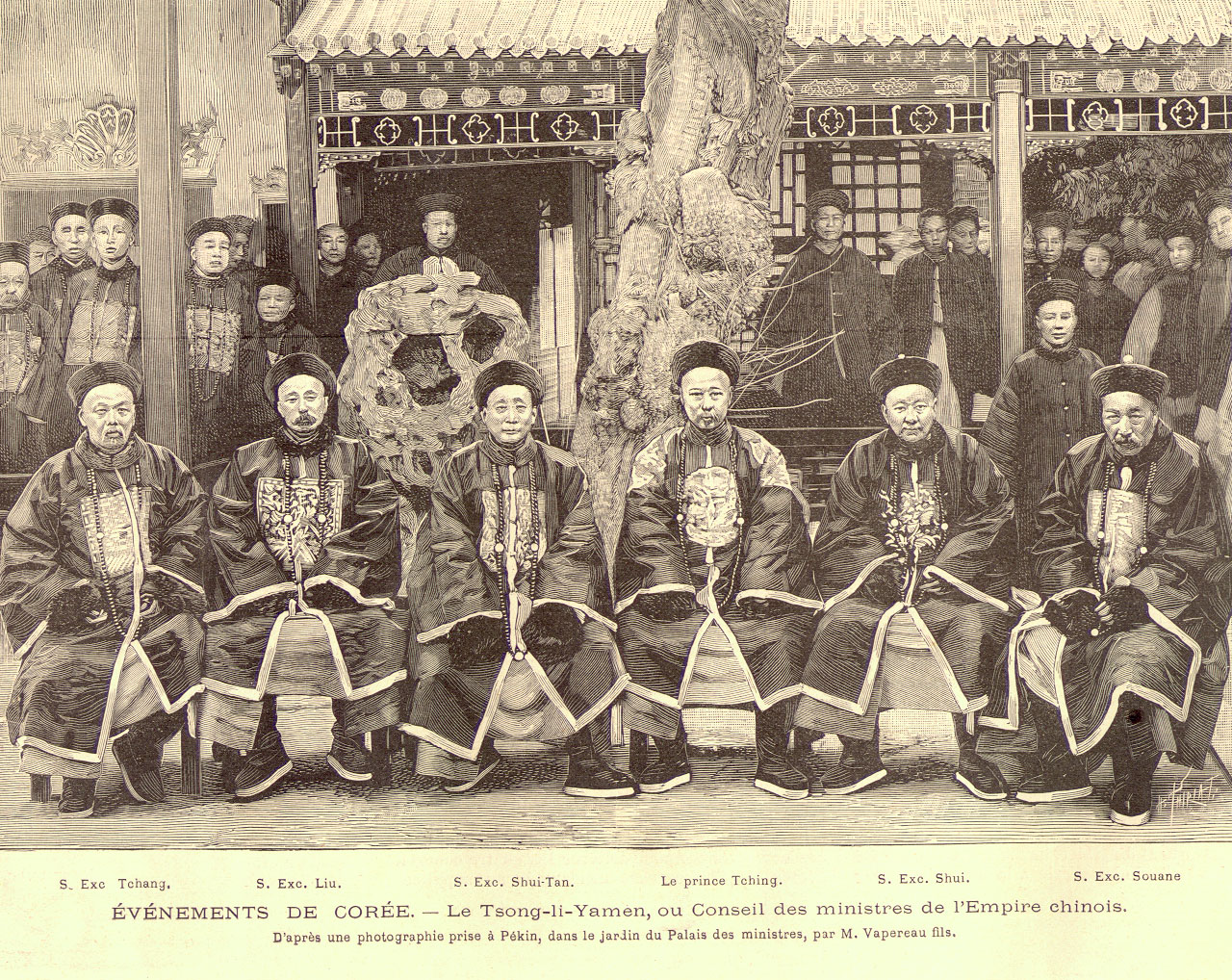
A photographic engraving of the members of the Zongli Yamen in 1894, at the time of the First Sino-Japanese War.

Prior to the creation of the Zongli Yamen, Qing foreign relations were conducted by several different agencies, such as the Ministry of Rites and the Lifan Yuan. The Zongli Yamen was the first significant institutional innovation in the central Beijing bureaucracy that the Qing government had made since the Yongzheng Emperor created the nucleus of the Grand Council in 1729. The Zongli Yamen was supervised by a controlling board of five senior officials (initially all Manchus), among whom Prince Gong was the de facto leader. In their discussions on establishing the new agency, Qing officials reiterated that it was only to be a temporary institution, maintained until the current foreign and domestic crisis had passed. The Zongli Yamen had a relatively low formal status in the Qing administrative hierarchy and its members served concurrently in other government agencies, which further weakened its position. Furthermore, the Zongli Yamen was not the sole policy making body in foreign affairs, a prerogative which still rested in the hands of the emperor. While the Zongli Yamen remained an important body for a few decades after its foundation, its influence was soon overshadowed by influential officials such as Zeng Guofan and Li Hongzhang. Nevertheless, it became the means of communication between the Qing government and the foreign ministers to China in Beijing's legation quarter.

The successor to the Bureau of Translators, the Tongwen Guan was set up by the Qing dynasty for translating western languages and subordinated to the Zongli Yamen instead of the Hanlin.

In 1873, the Zongli Yamen got into a quarrel with the foreign ministers to China over the protocol that was to be followed at their audience with the Tongzhi Emperor, as the foreign ministers not surprisingly refused to perform the ritual kowtow to the emperor, with an impasse eventually being solved thanks in part to the Japanese ambassador to China, Soejima Taneomi. Similar protocol would be followed in 1891 with the ministers' audience with the Guangxu Emperor.

In 1875, the Zongli Yamen began establishing consulates and legations in foreign countries staffed by Qing diplomats and assisted by both foreign staff and Qing interpreters trained at the Tongwen Guan. Through these permanent diplomatic missions, the Zongli Yamen gained a degree of autonomy in its self-representation and the ability to dispute the views of foreign diplomats in their home countries.

Following the Boxer Rebellion, the Qing government was forced to change its foreign service. According to Article XII in the Boxer Protocol 1901, the Zongli Yamen was replaced with a Foreign Office, known at the time as the Waiwubu (外務部; Wàiwùbù; 'External Affairs Department'), which ranked above the other six boards in the government; "as the course of subsequent events made clear, the Waiwubu was as ineffective in the establishment of good relations between China and the outside world as the Zongli Yamen had been."

== Current Location ==
The former site of the Zongli Yamen is now located in No. 49 of Dongtangzi Hutong, Dongcheng District, Beijing. The hutong was designated a historical conservation site in the People's Republic of China. Nearly all the buildings are preserved in good condition.

== See also ==
- Foreign relations of Imperial China
- List of diplomatic missions of the Qing dynasty
- Dates of establishment of diplomatic relations with the Qing dynasty
- Peking Legation Quarter
