= Government of the Ming dynasty =

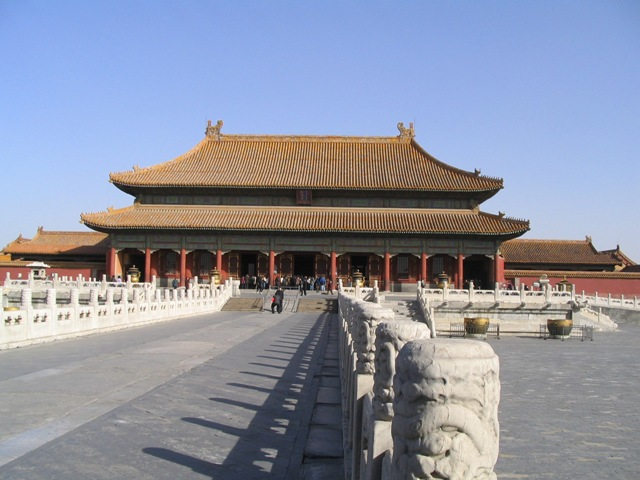
The Palace of Heavenly Purity in the Forbidden City, Beijing—the imperial residence of the Ming and Qing dynasties

The government of the Ming dynasty of China (1368–1644) was modeled after the Mongol-led Yuan dynasty. Over time, the government system changed and adapted to circumstances. The Ming government was traditionally divided into three branches—civil, military and surveillance, with the imperial household and its eunuchs holding a distinct position.

In the beginning, the central civil authorities were led by the Central Secretariat, which oversaw Six Ministries and other less significant institutions. The Chief Military Commission served as the high command of the army, while the Censorate held the highest control authority. The empire was divided into two metropolitan areas and thirteen provinces, each of which was managed by a Branch Secretariat. The lower levels of administration included prefectures and subprefectures, with the lowest level being the counties. There were approximately 1,400 counties in Ming China.

In 1376, the Branch Secretariats were abolished and replaced by three provincial offices: the Provincial Administrative Office, the Regional Military Commission, and the Provincial Surveillance Office. Four years later, a reorganization took place in the center as well. The Central Secretariat was abolished, the Chief Military Commission was divided into five Chief Military Commissions, and the Censorate was also divided. In the following decades, there was a trend towards centralization once again. The Censorate was restored under a new name, and the role of the Secretariat was taken over by the new Grand Secretariat. Additionally, provincial governors or grand coordinators were appointed to oversee all three provincial offices. Initially, these governors were sent to the provinces on a temporary basis, but eventually, they were permanently stationed there.

The civil administration was primarily staffed by Confucian-educated officials who had passed a rigorous multi-stage examination process to verify their education. Junior officer positions were often passed down through families, while senior officers were chosen based on their abilities. Palace eunuchs also played a significant role in the government, and although initially prohibited from involvement in politics, they gained influence following the Yongle era.

== Institutions and authorities ==
Over the course of two thousand years, the structure of executive power in China remained largely unchanged, with each dynasty making additions as they saw fit. The Han dynasty established the "Three Departments and Six Ministries" system for central administration, while the Ming dynasty had only one office—the Central Secretariat—overseeing Six Ministries. In 1380, the Hongwu Emperor executed Chancellor Hu Weiyong and abolished the highest level of administration, the Central Secretariat, while dividing the Chief Military Commission and reorganizing the Censorate. He personally took control of the Six Ministries and five Chief Military Commissions, placing their leaders at the top of the official hierarchy. These six ministers and the head of the reorganized Censorate were informally known as the "Seven Chief Ministers" (七卿). In more important court discussions, they were joined by the head of the Office of Transmission (通政司) and the head of the Court of Judicature and Revision, making them the "Nine Chief Ministers". While matters involving multiple departments were discussed by the Seven or Nine Chief Ministers, the final decision always rested with the emperor, who had the power to change it at any time.

The administration of the empire required a well-structured system of laws. In 1364, the Hongwu Emperor ordered the compilation of a new Confucian legal code, known as the Great Ming Code. This code was heavily influenced by the Tang Code from 653. The initial draft was completed in 1367 and the final version was adopted in 1397. This code remained unchanged until the empire's downfall, when it was amended with additional provisions.

The judiciary in China was not independent; local civil authorities held judicial power. Verdicts made by local authorities were subject to review by provincial authorities, and important cases were reviewed by the Ministry of Justice. Conflicts involving military personnel and the law were handled by their commanders, with further review taking place at the provincial regional military commissions and the Chief Military Commissions in the capital. Cases overseen by provincial control authorities were examined by the Censorate. The most serious cases were discussed by the Court of Judicature and Revision, which included representatives from the Ministry of Justice, the Chief Military Commissions, and the Censorate. The emperor's approval was required for death sentences.

=== Offices of the Imperial Household ===
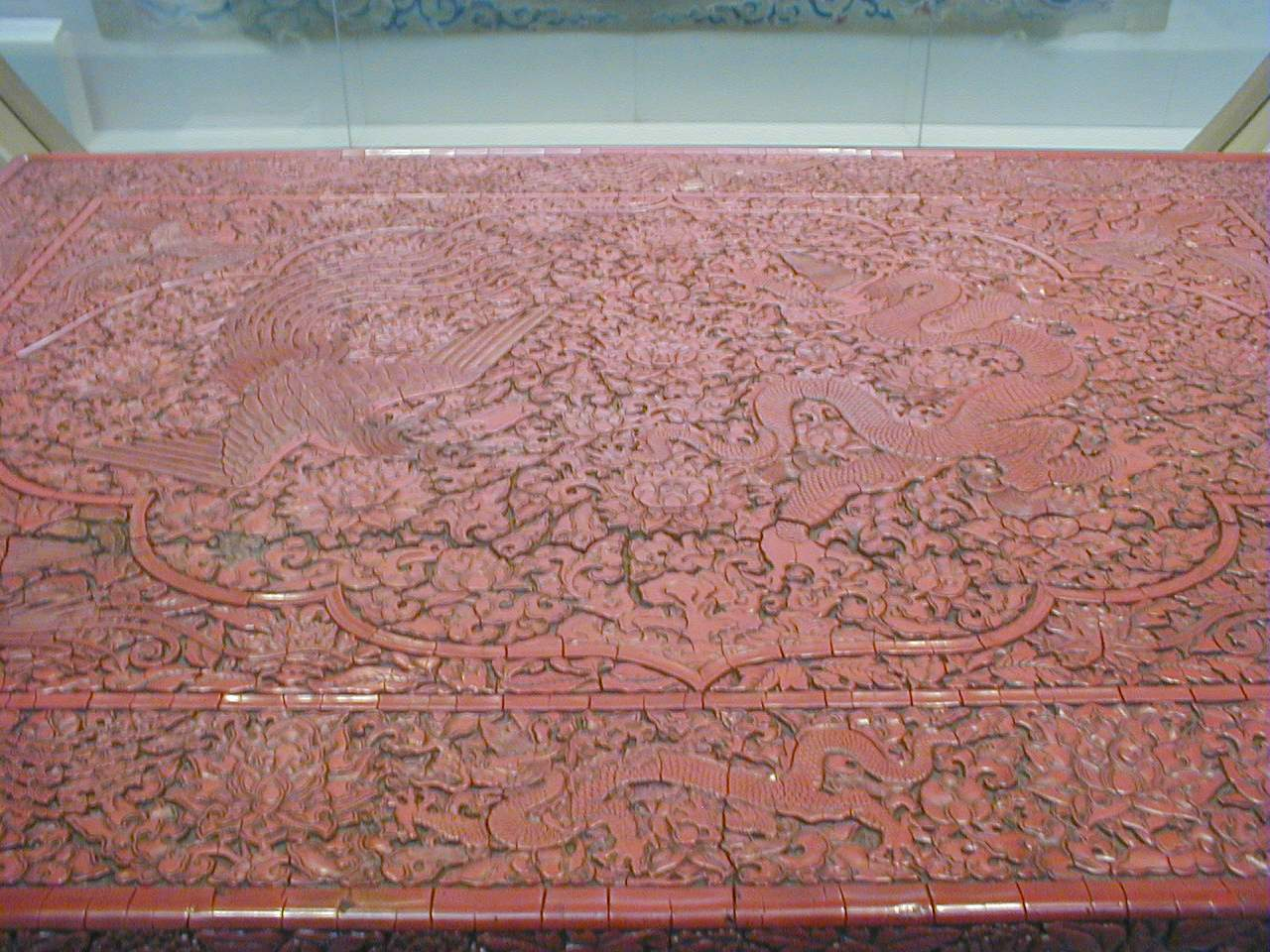
The only surviving piece of furniture from the "Orchard Factory" (the Imperial Lacquer Workshop) set up in Beijing in the early Ming dynasty. Decorated in dragons and phoenixes, it was made during the Xuande era (1426–1435). The imperial workshops in the Ming era were overseen by a eunuch bureau. (See closeup for detail)

The staff of the imperial household was composed of eunuchs and women, each with their own designated offices. The female staff were responsible for various tasks, including service, ceremony, clothing, food supply, bedchamber, crafts, and staff supervision. By the 1420s, eunuchs had taken over most of these roles, leaving only the office of clothing for women.

The Hongwu Emperor initially placed the relatively small number of eunuchs under the Directorate of Palace Attendants (內官監). However, as their numbers grew, so did their power and influence, resulting in the creation of twenty-four major agencies (二十四衙門)—twelve directorates (監; jian), four offices (司; si), and eight bureaus (局; ju)—to manage the thousands of eunuchs. The eunuch directorates were responsible for tasks such as staff control, ceremonies, food supply, kitchen utensils, documents, stables, seals, and clothing. Offices were established for fuel, music, paper, and baths, while bureaus were in charge of weapons, silverware, laundry, headgear, bronze products, textile production, vineyards, and orchards.

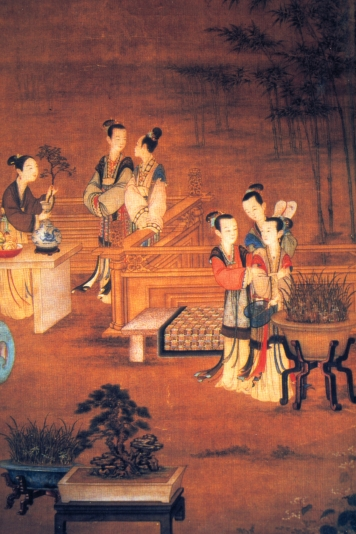
Ladies of the Ming imperial court, by an unknown artist, c. 1580 AD.

The Hongwu Emperor prohibited eunuchs from learning to read and involving themselves in political affairs. It is uncertain how strictly these laws were enforced during his own rule. However, when the Yongle Emperor ascended to the throne, eunuchs were able to hold positions of power, oversee state workshops, lead armies, and interfere in the selection and appointment of officials. This eventually led to the establishment of a separate administrative network, controlled by eunuchs and operating independently from the standard bureaucratic system. While a few eunuchs such as Wang Zhen, Wang Zhi, and Liu Jin held quasi-dictatorial power during the Ming dynasty, the extent of eunuch influence was not openly apparent until the 1590s, when the Wanli Emperor expanded their authority over the civil administration and granted them the right to collect provincial taxes.

One of the most effective means of controlling subjects was through the secret service, initially based in the Eastern Depot and later in the Western Depot. (Note: The Eastern Depot, established in 1420 by the Yongle Emperor, and its later counterpart, the Western Depot, established in 1477 by the Chenghua Emperor, were eunuch-controlled secret police organizations responsible for surveillance, investigating political offenses, and enforcing imperial authority.) This secret service was directly subordinated to the Directorate of Ceremonial, which represented a significant power center during the Ming period. Over time, the eunuch in charge of the Directorate of Ceremonial gained the position of chief of the palace staff and almost dictatorial power in the empire.

While the majority of the palace staff consisted of eunuchs and women, there was also a group of officials in the Seal Office (尚寶司) who worked alongside the eunuchs to maintain and preserve seals and seal implements. Other palace officials were responsible for overseeing the affairs of the imperial princes. The emperor chose and supported the palace staff, both eunuchs and officials, who were collectively known as the "inner court". This was in contrast to the "outer court", which consisted of the Six Ministries, the Censorate, and other authorities.

=== Civil authorities ===
==== Grand Secretariat and Six Ministries ====
Despite the official rhetoric of resisting Mongol rule and reviving the Tang dynasty model, the Hongwu Emperor did not simply restore the old system or copy the Yuan dynasty's administrative structure. Instead, he incorporated elements of traditional Chinese administration, dividing it into civil, surveillance, and military offices. (Note: Under the Yuan dynasty, the central government was organized around the Secretariat (Zhongshu Sheng), the Censorate (Yushitai), and the Bureau of Military Affairs (Shumi Yuan), which respectively handled civil administration, supervisory functions, and military affairs. The Ming largely retained this tripartite division while modifying its institutional form.) At the center of this system was the Central Secretariat (中書省; Zhongshu Sheng), led by two grand chancellors (丞相; chengxiang) of the rank 1a, known as "of the left" (senior) and "of the right" (junior). These two were informally referred to as the "Prime Ministers" (宰相; zaixiang). The Secretariat oversaw Six Ministries and other civil authorities.

Submissions and memoranda addressed to the emperor were centralized in the Office of Reports Inspection (察言司; Chayan si) starting in 1370, which was later renamed the Office of Transmission (通政司; Tongzheng si) in 1377. Copies were sent to Offices of Scrutiny (科; ke), which oversaw the various ministries, while the original was sent directly to the emperor. With the emergence of the grand secretaries, a new process was implemented where they would propose a solution to the emperor, and after receiving his signature, the relevant supervisory authority would forward the documents to the appropriate ministry. In most cases, the matter was first discussed by the seven or nine chief ministers, and the Office of Transmission then reviewed the ministers' written opinions. The final decision was then announced through an imperial decree in the court record (朝报; chaobao) and in a condensed form in the Beijing Gazette (邸報; dibao), which also included reports on the country's domestic and foreign policies.

In 1380, the Hongwu Emperor abolished the Central Secretariat and personally took over the management of Six Ministries. This resulted in the concentration of the country's administration directly in the hands of the emperor. The Emperor soon became overwhelmed by a large amount of official correspondence and reports. (Note: After the abolition of the Central Secretariat during a ten-day period, the Hongwu Emperor was presented with 1660 documents containing 3391 issues that required imperial decisions.) As a solution, in 1382 he appointed several (usually three to six) grand secretaries (大學士; daxueshi) from the members of the Hanlin Academy. These grand secretaries served as the emperor's advisors and also assisted the tutors of the heir apparent.

Originally, the grand secretaries recorded imperial decisions. Later, the Yongle Emperor transferred the handling of his correspondence to the grand secretaries, and from the 1420s they gained a dominant role in the government. However, they never held the same status as the former Central Secretariat—they did not have the authority to give orders to other authorities or require reports. Although their rank remained at the low level of the rank 5a, their actual power was demonstrated through the granting of formal titles such as minister or vice minister, and later the ancient high titles of "Three Ducal Ministers" (三公; sangong) associated with the rank 1a, and "Three Solitaries" (三孤; sangu) with the rank 1b. The term Grand Secretariat (內閣; Neige), which was informally used at the time, was not officially introduced until the mid-16th century. Members of the Grand Secretariat were chosen from the Hanlin Academy, with the understanding that they would serve as instruments of the emperor's will without any influence from the ministry. Unlike the leaders of the ministries, they did not have to go through long-term service in regional and central offices, which led to them being viewed as outsiders by the officials of the government apparatus and being counted among the "inner court". In reality, the Grand Secretariat followed its own agenda, often diverging from both the emperor and the ministerial administration.

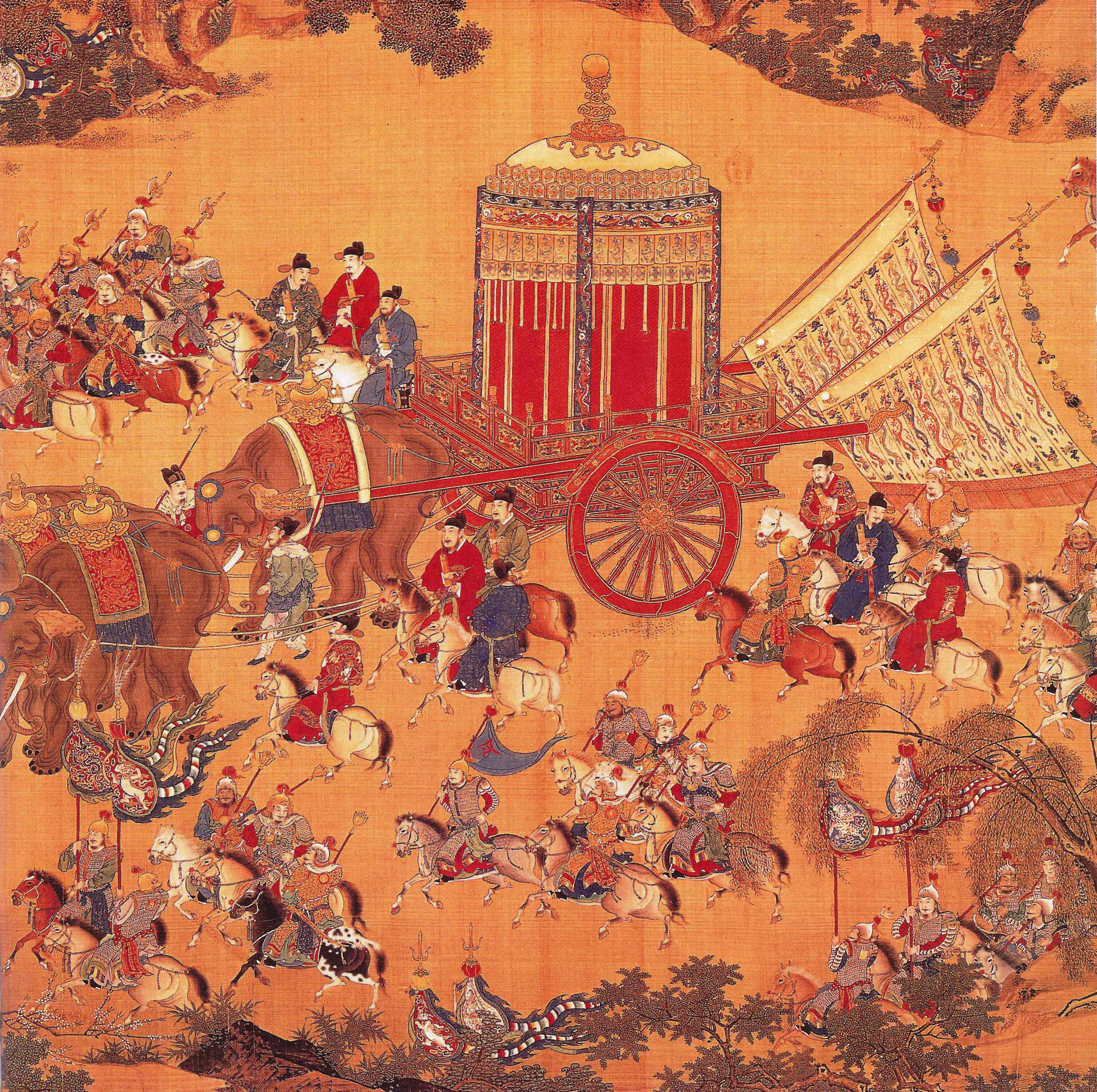
Detail of The Emperor's Approach showing the Wanli Emperor's royal carriage being pulled by elephants and escorted by cavalry (full panoramic painting here)

The Grand Secretariat played a coordinating role, while the Six Ministries (部; bu)—Personnel, Revenue, Rites, War, Justice, and Works—were responsible for their own administrative tasks. Each ministry was led by a minister (尚書; shangshu) with the rank 3a, which was upgraded to the rank 2a in 1380, and a vice minister (侍郎; shilang).

- The Ministry of Personnel (吏部; Libu) was responsible for overseeing the promotion and transfer of civil servants, as well as the awarding of honors and titles. The position of minister of personnel was considered the most prestigious of the six ministerial roles.
- The Ministry of Revenue or Finance (戶部; Hubu), was responsible for managing state revenue. This included overseeing the maintenance of tax records for peasants and collecting their taxes in the various provinces. The ministry also handled monetary affairs. To effectively carry out these duties, it was divided into bureaus overseeing specific provinces. However, the customs houses located along the Grand Canal were under the direct authority of the ministry and were not subject to local government control.
- The Ministry of Rites (禮部; Libu) was responsible for overseeing official religious ceremonies, rituals, and sacrifices. It maintained records of Taoist and Buddhist clergy, with the leaders of both religious communities holding the status of a sixth-rank official. Additionally, the ministry was responsible for receiving foreign envoys. It also oversaw offices for musicians, dancers, and court entertainment.
- The Ministry of War (兵部; Bingbu) was responsible for appointing and deploying army commanders, managing fortifications, supplying troops with weapons and equipment, breeding horses for the army, and overseeing the courier service network. Additionally, it maintained records of hereditary soldiers and their families.
- The Ministry of Justice (刑部; Xingbu) was responsible for overseeing the administration of justice for the country's civilians, similar to how the Ministry of Revenue was organized by province. It worked closely with the independent Censorate and the Court of Judicature and Revision.
- The Ministry of Public Works (工部; Gongbu) was responsible for organizing government construction enterprises, such as hiring and supplying labor, repairing canals and roads, standardizing weights and measures, and organizing labor duties. It also oversaw the management of state workshops, including armories, ironworks, textiles, and shipbuilding. In 1471, the ministry received a collection of tax levies from the Ministry of Revenue for the extraction of wood (i.e. trees). Additionally, the ministry registered artisans and ensured that they fulfilled their tax obligations.

==== Other central authorities ====
In addition to the ministries, there were also several lower-ranking offices that served under them or operated independently. These included the Hanlin Academy, which focused on literary and historical matters and played a role in creating government decrees. Other important offices included the Directorate of Astronomy (欽天監), the Imperial Academy of Medicine (太醫院), and the Directorate of Imperial Parks (上林苑監). The Imperial University (國子監; Guozijian), led by a chancellor (秶酒; jijiu; literally 'libationer') with official rank 4b, was responsible for the education system.

The highest judicial authority was the Court of Judicature and Revision (大理寺; Dali si). Its role was to review and confirm decisions made by the Ministry of Justice, the Chief Military Commissions, and the Censorate. All of the court's decisions were considered final, except for death sentences, which required the emperor's approval. The Court of Judicature and Revision, along with the Ministry of Justice and the Censorate, were collectively known as the "Three Judicial Offices" (三法司; Sanfa si).

==== Capitals ====
Yingtian (In response to Heaven; present-day Nanjing) was the original capital of the empire and the residence of the emperor. In 1368, during the Hongwu Emperor's several-month stay in Kaifeng in Central China, the Ming government designated Yingtian as Nanjing (Southern Capital) and Kaifeng as Beijing (Northern Capital). In February 1403, the Yongle Emperor designated Beiping (present-day Beijing) as the secondary capital, renamed it Shuntian (Obedient to Heaven), and oversaw its transformation into a new imperial capital; upon the completion of its construction in 1421, the government moved there while Nanjing became the secondary capital. Both cities had a complete structure of ministries and government offices, with a few exceptions. After 1421, the number of officials in the Nanjing ministries decreased significantly (Note: In the late Ming period, there were over a thousand officials (官; guan) and more than 1200 lower-level employees (吏; li) serving in the central offices in Beijing; in Nanjing, there were almost 400 officials and nearly 600 lower-level employees.) and their responsibilities were largely limited to the southern metropolitan region. The Nanjing Ministries of War, Justice, Personnel, and Revenue, however, retained broader authority in certain matters and exercised jurisdiction throughout southern China. (Note: The Nanjing Ministry of War was responsible for timely suppression of rebellions and pirates in southern China; the Nanjing Ministry of Justice confirmed sentences from the southern provinces; during the 15th century, the jurisdiction of the Nanjing Ministry of Personnel expanded to include monitoring the evaluations of officials from most of southern China; the Nanjing Ministry of Revenue also participated in collecting land taxes from Zhejiang, Jiangxi, and Hubei, issued licenses for salt trade throughout the empire, and managed the Yellow Registers.)

The Ming government designated both metropolises, Yingtian and Shuntian, as prefectures (fu). These prefectures, which encompassed the capital cities and their surrounding areas, were not part of any province. Instead, they were directly subordinate to the government and were known as the Metropolitan Areas (京; jing). The region surrounding Nanjing (present-day Anhui and Jiangsu provinces) was referred to as Jingshi (Metropolitan Area), although it was also informally known as Zhili (直隸; literally 'directly attached'). In 1403, the province of Beiping (encompassing present-day Beijing and Hebei) was reorganized into Beijing (Northern Metropolitan Area), informally known as Beizhili. In 1421, the names were changed to Nanjing (Southern Metropolitan Area), informally known as Nanzhili in the south, and Jingshi, informally known as Zhili, in the north.

Formally, the Ming dynasty had two other capitals: Zhongdu (Central Capital) and Xingdu (Flourishing Capital). Zhongdu (near Fengyang) was established in 1369 by the Hongwu Emperor, who wanted to transfer the seat of government from Nanjing to his native region. Due to its inconvenient location and high costs, he eventually abandoned the effort to transfer the metropolis. However, the city retained its formal status as a capital. In 1531, the Jiajing Emperor granted formal capital status to Xingdu (located in present-day Zhongxiang County, Hubei province), which was his birthplace. At the same time, he renamed Anluzhou to Chengtian Prefecture (Following the Heavens) in imitation of the prefectures of the two main capitals.

==== Regional and local administration ====
During the Song dynasty, the highest level of administration was the circuit (路; lu). After the Jurchen invasion of 1127, the Song government restructured their administration into four semi-autonomous regional administrations. These regional administrations were responsible for managing local civil and military authorities and had their own bureaucracy. This provincial system remained unchanged throughout the Yuan, Ming, and Qing dynasties.

The Ming emperors modeled their system of regional administration on that of the Yuan dynasty. When the Ming dynasty was established on Chinese New Year in 1368, it initially controlled the metropolitan area around the capital city of Nanjing and three provinces: Zhejiang, Jiangxi, and Huguang (which is present day divided into Hubei and Hunan). However, through military campaigns, the Ming government gradually annexed more territories, including Fujian, Guangdong, Guangxi, Henan, Shandong (which also included Liaodong), Shanxi, and Beijing (which was reorganized into the Northern Metropolitan Area in 1403, informally known as Beizhili). In 1369, the Ming conquered the province of Shaanxi, which also encompassed the modern-day provinces of Gansu and Ningxia. Sichuan was added in 1371, and Yunnan in 1382. In 1413, Guizhou province was formed from parts of Huguang, Yunnan, and Sichuan. From 1407 to 1428, Jiaozhi province was established in northern Vietnam. After its abolition, the number of provinces remained unchanged at thirteen until the end of the dynasty.

Initially, the provinces were governed by the Branch Secretariats, but in 1376, they were replaced by "the three provincial offices": the Provincial Administrative Office (布政司; Buzhengsi), the Regional Military Commission, and the Provincial Surveillance Office. The Provincial Administration Commissioner (布政使; buzhengshi), with the rank 2b, headed the Provincial Administrative Office, which was responsible for civil administration. The Regional Military Commission oversaw military units in the province, while the Provincial Surveillance Office monitored all activities.

Territory of the Ming dynasty, with two capitals, provincial capitals and main state transportation routes marked

In 1391, the Hongwu Emperor sent his heir, Zhu Biao, to Shaanxi to "tour and soothe" (巡撫; xunfu). In 1421, the Yongle Emperor sent 26 officials to the provinces with a similar goal. This practice became regular in the 1420s, with officials from the center coordinating the work of civil, military, and provincial authorities in two or more provinces at once. By the 1430s, these officials had permanent roles. They were known as the grand coordinators (xunfu) and were considered representatives of the central government, with titles such as minister or vice minister. The supreme commanders (總督; zongdu), who were also sent to the regions by the central government, had a higher status than the grand coordinators and were primarily responsible for military tasks. Over time, the roles of xunfu and zongdu evolved into the offices of provincial governor and governor-general during the Qing dynasty.

Provinces were divided into prefectures (府; fu) managed by prefects (知府; zhifu). Below the prefectures were subprefectures (州; zhou) headed by subprefecture magistrates (知州; zhizhou). The lowest level of administration was the county (縣; xian) headed by a magistrate (知縣; zhixian). During the Ming era, there were a total of 1,385 counties. (Note: According to other sources, the empire was divided into 159 prefectures, 240 subprefectures, and 1,144 counties.) In order to better supervise their assigned areas, the Investigating Censors divided the empire into circuits (道; dao), each named for one of the provinces.

The county office was the lowest level of civil state administration during the Ming era, overseeing an area with approximately 40,000 inhabitants. (Note: Ming China had a total of 1,385 counties and by the 1380s, it had a population of over 60 million.) It was led by three senior officials (官; guan): the county magistrate, his vice magistrate, and an assistant magistrate. Additionally, there were a significant number of lower officials (吏; li) and support staff. The main responsibility of the county magistrate and his subordinates was to maintain order and ensure the well-being of the population in their designated area. This included tasks such as keeping population registers (known as the Yellow Registers) and recording land ownership in the Fish Scale Registers. Other duties included collecting taxes, apprehending and prosecuting criminals, and resolving disputes.

Parts of the Sichuan and Huguang provinces, and especially in Guizhou and Yunnan, had a significant non-Chinese population. These regions were governed by native authorities known as tusi, at the prefecture, subprefecture, or county level. These native authorities were established by granting Chinese official titles and ranks to local chiefs, who were then referred to as "native officials" or tuguan. From the 16th century onwards, the term tusi was used to describe areas that were administered similarly to regular Chinese regions. The population in these areas had the same responsibilities as the Chinese and were governed by a combination of native chiefs and Chinese officials who were accountable to higher civil authorities. On the other hand, indigenous tuguan officials, mostly with military titles, were in charge of regions that maintained a significant level of autonomy, but were still under the supervision of the Ministry of War.

==== Local government ====
During the Ming period, four distinct systems of population organization existed at the sub-county level. These systems, while largely overlapping, served different purposes. The first was a multi-level territorial division of the county. The second involved grouping households into units of tens and hundreds through the lijia system, which facilitated the collection of taxes and labor for the state. The third system was the baojia security organization, and the fourth was the xiangyue village assembly. While their boundaries often aligned and their tasks overlapped, this structure provided self-government with the coherence and longevity that lasted well into the 20th century.

In the Tang dynasty, zhou (or prefecture) served as the basic unit of local state administration. However, with the growth of population in the Song dynasty, the focus shifted to the county level. During the Ming period, there was yet another shift, with the key administrative level moving down two levels. At the level below the county, there were no centrally appointed civil servants, resulting in local elites taking control of local administration. From the mid-16th century onwards, this role was primarily held by the gentry, a class of wealthy and educated landowners.

Depending on the population and size of the fields, counties were divided into smaller territorial units, typically ranging from two to four levels. The highest sub-county unit was xiang (鄉), with an average of eight units per county, but sometimes up to twenty. These units did not exist in cities. In smaller counties, there were only a few hundred registered households, while in more populated counties like Jiangnan, there could be over 15,000 households. At the middle level, rural counties or towns were known as du (都), while urban counties were referred to as fang (坊) or yu (隅), and suburbs were called xiang (廂). These units typically had 500–2000 households, with one to a dozen units per county, usually three. Each unit had its own land registers and served as the primary means for the county authorities to handle administrative and tax tasks. In the southern regions with high population density, an additional administrative level was introduced between the county and middle-level units—li (里), which was equivalent in size to counties in other areas. The smallest unit was known as tu (圖) or she (社) in the north, and sometimes tun (屯) or fang (坊) in northern cities. These units typically consisted of approximately 1,000 individuals.

County officials oversaw the registration of taxpayers, the collection of taxes, and the organization of work duties through the system of local self-government known as lijia (里甲). This system was based on the prescribed organization of ten households (Note: The state also registered Buddhist and Taoist monasteries as households.) forming a jia, ten jia forming a li, and ten wealthier families forming one li. However, li often included a few extra households beyond the standard number of 110, as well as households too poor to pay labor and taxes. The average number of households in a li was roughly 140 or 140 to 160. The families within a jia would alternate leading their group for a year, while the ten wealthiest families would rotate in the role of li administrator. Each year, one jia was responsible for providing labor and in-kind supplies, while the other nine jia only had to pay taxes. In the second half of the 15th century, the jia served twice in a ten-year cycle—once as a supplier of materials and goods, and the second time as a provider of services and labor. As the 16th century progressed and most allowances and corvée were replaced by surcharges on land taxes, the importance of the lijia system declined. By the mid-Ming era, it existed only as a formal tax registration system, and in the 16th century, the li took on the character of a territorial unit, merging with the counties. From the mid-Ming period, the baojia (保甲) system ran parallel to the lijia system, with ten households forming a jia and ten jia forming a bao. Elected leaders, known as jiazhang and baozhang, were tasked with maintaining public order. Local assemblies also played a role in this system, as they would come to agreements known as community compacts (鄉約; xiangyue) to encourage adherence to community norms and mutual assistance.

=== Censorate ===
The traditional branch of the Chinese government was the Censorate (御史台; Yushi tai; literally 'Tribunal of Censors'), an independent control institution responsible for overseeing the official apparatus. It was headed by two Censors-in-chief (御史大夫; yushi dafu) of the rank 1b. Following its reorganization in 1380, the institution was re-established under the new name (都察院; Ducha yuan; literally 'Chief Surveillance Office'), with its heads reduced to rank 2a.

The censors held significant power, as they were responsible for monitoring the actions of both civil and military authorities and institutions. They could also request corrective measures from these entities. One of their main duties was to identify and address any errors or mistakes made by the emperors, making them the guardians of customs and law. The core of the Censorate consisted of 110 Investigative Censors with the rank 7a, who had direct access to the emperor. These censors were sent to different provinces with the title of Regional Inspectors (巡按; xunan) for a year, during which they traveled and oversaw the region. They had unrestricted access to official records, received complaints from the public, and reprimanded officials. They also had the authority to propose the dismissal of individuals and suggest changes in government policies, which were then directly forwarded to the emperor. In matters of local importance, they were able to directly instruct local authorities. The power of these censors was so great that, in order to balance it, the grand coordinators were given the title of Vice or Assistant Censors-in-chief, making them formally superior to the Regional Inspectors. In addition to the Regional Inspectors, censors with lower levels of authority were also sent from the central government.

The Six Offices of Scrutiny (六科; liuke) existed alongside the Censorate, one for each ministry, headed by supervising secretaries of relatively low seventh rank. These offices were directly subordinate to the emperor. The employees of these offices were assigned to ministries based on their expertise and provided independent expert assessments of matters. Their responsibilities included overseeing the flow of documents to and from ministries, as well as the ability to reformulate or even cancel unsatisfactory decisions. Provincial Surveillance Offices (提刑按察司; Tixing anchasi, or simply Ancha si), headed by a Surveillance Commissioner (按察使; anchashi) of the rank 3a, handled matters at the provincial level. These offices carried out control and disciplinary tasks, and functioned as an appeals court.

=== Military ===
Military service was hereditary during the Ming dynasty. Soldiers and their families (軍戶; junhu, as opposed to civilian families—民戶; minhu) were exempt from paying land taxes and fulfilling work obligations, unlike peasants and artisans. These families were under the jurisdiction of the Ministry of War and were stationed in strategically important areas of the empire, where they farmed on land allocated to them by the state. Each family was required to provide one soldier to serve in the local garrisons. Military units were regularly transferred from assembly points to training divisions near Beijing and to armies stationed along the frontier. The Ministry of War was responsible for the organization, supply, administration, and personnel matters of the army. Initially, the Chief Military Commission (大都督府; Da dudufu) was in charge of commanding the troops, but in 1380, it was divided into five Chief Military Commissions, (Note: It was the Chief Military Commission of the Center, of the Left, of the Right, of the Front, and of the Rear.) each led by a commanders-in-chief (都督; dudu) who held the rank 1a.

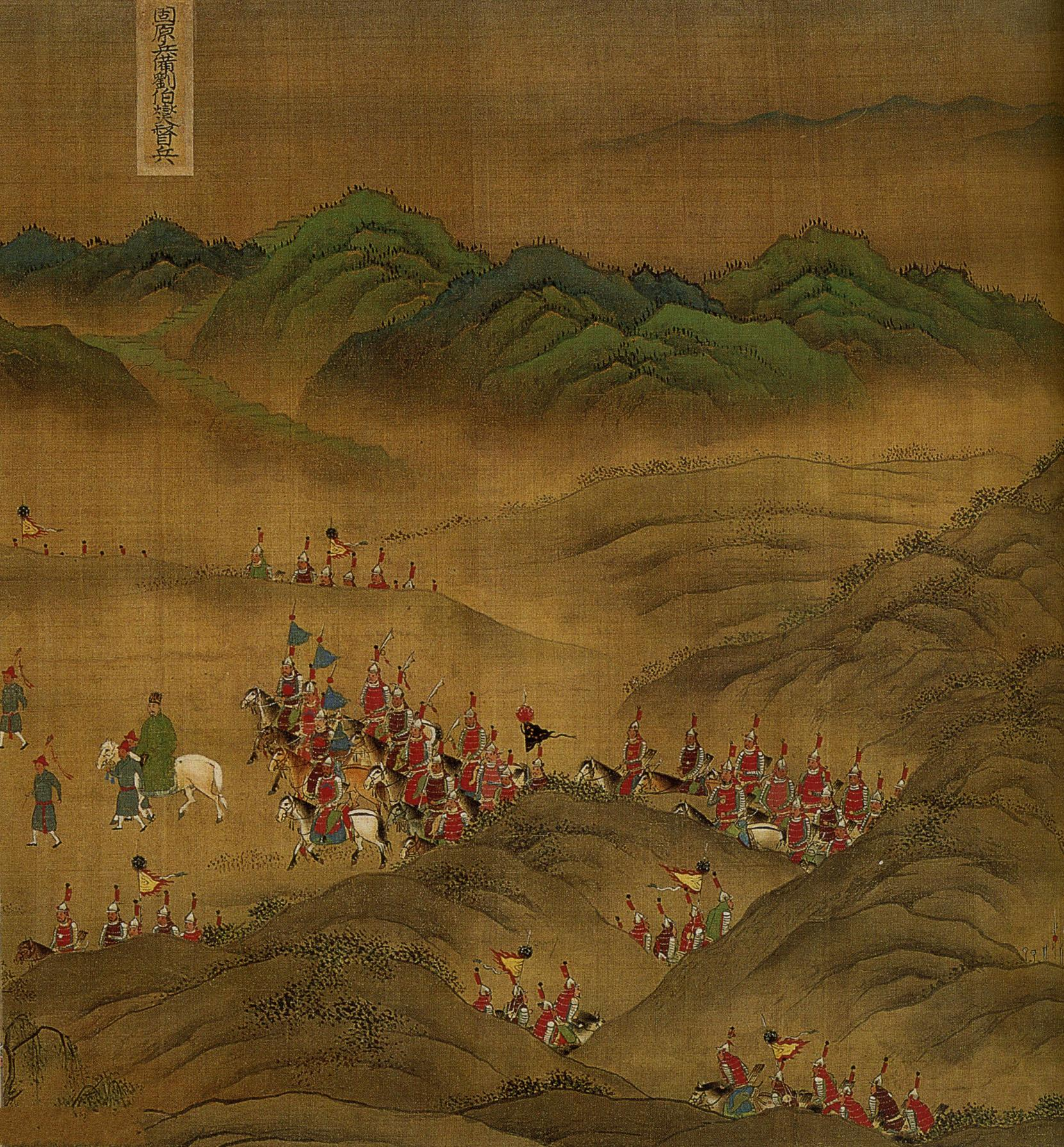
Ming cavalry, illustration from Pingfan desheng tu (平番得勝圖), depicting the campaign to pacify nomadic tribes in Northwest China during the early Wanli era

At the provincial level, the troops were under the control of Regional Military Commissions (都指揮使司, or simply 都司), with thirteen commissions for each province and three additional commissions in sensitive areas along the northern borders. The Regional Commissioners held the rank 2a and were responsible for overseeing guards (衞; wei), each consisting of 5,600 soldiers. These guards were further divided into five battalions (千戶所; qianhusuo), each with 1,120 soldiers. Each battalion was then divided into 10 companies (百戶所, baihusuo), each with 112 soldiers. The battalion commander held the rank 5a, while the company commander held the rank 6a.

In addition to the guard units stationed throughout the empire, a large concentration of troops was deployed around Beijing as part of the Capital Guards (京衛; jingwei). Altogether, they comprised 74 guard units, including 33 Imperial Guards (上直衛; shangzhi wei or 親軍衛; qinjun wei) responsible for the security of the imperial palace. The most important of these was the Embroidered Uniform Guard (Jinyiwei), which served as the emperor's personal bodyguard. Neither the Imperial Guards nor 15 other Capital Guard units were placed under the supervision of the five Chief Military Commissions. Nanjing also had a large concentration of Capital Guards, numbering 49 units in total, 17 of which were designated as Imperial Guards. Unlike those in Beijing, however, these forces were subordinate to the five auxiliary Chief Military Commissions of Nanjing. The princes had their own personal guards known as Escort Guards (護衛; huwei).

In 1392, the Ming army reportedly numbered 1,198,442 soldiers. It had grown by the early 15th century to include 493 guards and 359 battalions. In the 1440s, the army reached a peak of 3,150,000 soldiers, but in the middle of the Ming period, troop numbers decreased by about half. By the end of the dynasty, they had once again increased to over four million.

=== Government communications ===
Administering the country required constant movement of people and goods, as officials travelled between the capital and the regions, while subjects were expected to perform work duties even if it meant traveling hundreds of kilometers away from their homes. This created a need to ensure the supply of goods to both the metropolis and the regions. To handle these tasks, three bureaus were established: the courier service (yichuan), the postal service (yidi), and the transport service (diyun).

The courier service, under the authority of the Ministry of War, was responsible for transporting messages between different regions and the capital, as well as conveying officials, messengers, taxes (such as grain and other goods), and people performing labor duties or military service. Along the communication routes, courier service stations were established every 60–80 li (34–45 km, during the Ming dynasty, 1 li was equivalent to 559.8 meters). This distance was considered a day's journey. The staff at these stations were responsible for providing accommodation, food, and transportation to authorized individuals. It was mandatory for these individuals to have appropriate official documents, even for large groups of dozens of members, and everyone was counted by name. The transportation of people and goods was a crucial responsibility for the service's officers, who were held to strict deadlines. Failure to meet these deadlines resulted in punishment as a military offense. The local population was responsible for providing everything necessary for the service's operation through labor obligations and in-kind levies. During the middle Ming period, these obligations were converted into cash payments, which local authorities then used to fund services. This reform led to a chronic lack of funding and a decrease in the number of stations. During the Hongwu Emperor's reign, there were 1,936 stations, but by 1587, this number had decreased to 1,036.

The postal service, which was established by the Yuan dynasty, was also under the jurisdiction of the military department. It was carried out by "postal soldiers"—hereditary soldiers stationed at various locations who were responsible for delivering messages. These stations were approximately 10 li (5.6 km) apart, and it would take about 45 minutes to deliver a message between them, resulting in a transmission speed of 190 km per day. In the border areas, there were chains of towers manned by a dozen soldiers who used signal fires to transmit messages. In 1376, transport offices were established in each prefecture with the purpose of providing extensive transport services, including the transportation of tax grain and individuals with work duties.

== Aristocracy and officials ==
=== Eunuchs, members of the imperial family, and officers ===
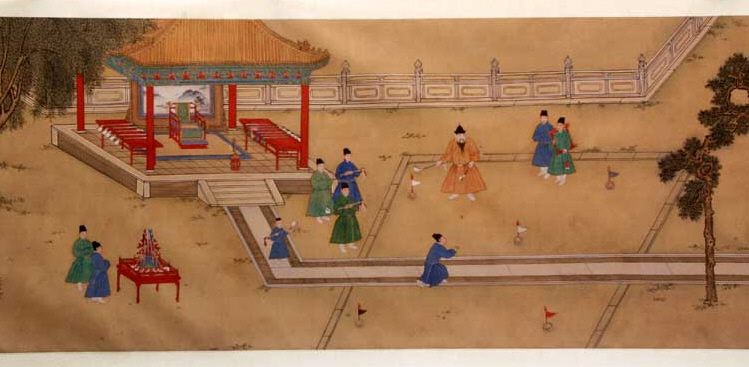
The Xuande Emperor playing chuiwan with his eunuchs, a game similar to golf, by an anonymous court painter of the Xuande period (1425–35)

Eunuchs had their own hierarchy based on the same principles as officials, but they could not advance beyond rank 4a. In an effort to control their power, the Hongwu Emperor attempted to limit their influence in the future. Initially, there were only 100 eunuchs in the imperial palace, but later the Hongwu Emperor increased their number to 400. Under the Yongle Emperor, the number and influence of eunuchs continued to grow, and they were even assigned to other members of the imperial family. Despite the Hongwu Emperor's ban on the education of eunuchs, their involvement in politics made it unsustainable, leading to the establishment of a palace school for young eunuchs in 1426. The teachers for this school were selected from the Hanlin Academy.

The number of eunuchs gradually increased, reaching 10,000 in the 1520s. The profession of a palace eunuch began to be seen as a means of social advancement, particularly during times of economic crisis. During the Wanli era, thousands of eunuchs were recruited in multiple waves to serve in the Forbidden City, (Note: In 1572, 3,250 eunuchs were admitted to the palace, followed by 3,570 in 1578, and an additional 2,000 in 1588, continuing until the end of the dynasty.) leading to a surge in applicants. By 1620, there were 20,000 eunuchs on the streets of Beijing, causing concern for the government. By the time of the Ming dynasty's downfall in 1644, there were approximately 70,000 eunuchs serving in the palace and an additional 30,000 in other parts of the country.

The sons of each emperor were granted the title of prince (王; wang) of a specific territory, which was passed down through the male line. The titles given to younger sons of princes, their sons, and so on, decreased in rank. This meant that all male descendants of the dynasty's founder held some form of noble title and received a corresponding income from the state treasury. By the end of the dynasty, it is estimated that there were around 100,000 descendants, and their appanages placed a significant burden on the state's finances. Imperial women and their husbands also received titles and income based on their relationship to the emperors.

The emperors often gave their relatives large land holdings and high military positions, but they did not actively lead the army, and their titles were largely symbolic after the reigns of the first two emperors. While the princes resided in the territories designated by their titles, they did not have any administrative or governing responsibilities, and therefore did not hold feudal estates in the same sense as European rulers. They were not independent rulers in their territories, unlike during the Han and Jin dynasties. Additionally, members of the imperial family did not serve in the state administration.

Officers were part of a multi-level hierarchy, similar to civil servants, and had to defend their position every five years, but military service was considered less prestigious than a civilian career. This was due to the fact that military positions were often passed down through families, unlike civil positions where individuals were selected based on their abilities. Additionally, Confucian ethics ranked occupations involving violence (wu) lower than those involving knowledge (wen). Despite this lower status, officers were allowed to take civil examinations, and in 1478, military examinations were introduced to assess the competence of military leaders.

The Ming emperors introduced a new office, the military inspector (總督; zongdu), to the bureaucratic structure inherited from the Yuan dynasty. Initially, mainly officers from noble families commanded the army, but over time, they were gradually replaced by individuals of lower social status. Higher ranks were awarded based on merit, while lower ranks were hereditary from the beginning of the dynasty. The number of officers also grew significantly, from 16,489 in 1392 to 100,000 in the early 17th century.

=== Civil officials ===
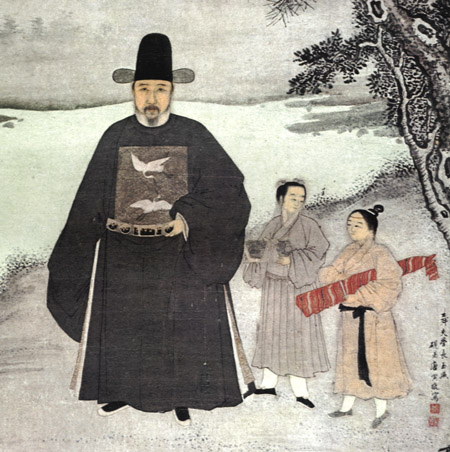
Portrait of Jiang Shunfu (1453–1504), now in the Nanjing Museum. The decoration of two cranes on his chest is a "rank badge" that indicates he was a civil official of the first rank.

In 1373–1384, the Hongwu Emperor implemented a new system for appointing officials (官; guan) based on recommendations. This was a departure from the previous and subsequent practice of following the examination system established by the Sui dynasty. Theoretically, anyone with the necessary skills could hold positions in the state administration, but the attempts of merchant sons to enter the administration were seen as disruptive. In reality, only individuals from wealthy families, particularly landowners, had the resources and time to prepare for the examinations. The Ming government also enforced quotas for recruiting officials from each province, in an attempt to prevent power from being concentrated in the hands of educated elites. The printing industry had undergone significant development since the Song dynasty, resulting in a rise in the overall level of education. The number of qualified individuals for civil service positions across the country increased. Educational materials such as multiplication tables and syllabaries with basic characters were printed for children. In addition, affordable editions of Confucian classics and compendiums of answers to test questions were mass-produced for adult students.

Candidates are waiting for the results of the examinations; detail from a handscroll by Qiu Ying (1494–1552).

In the past, examinees were expected to have knowledge of classic Confucian books, specifically the "Four Books" selected by Zhu Xi in the 12th century for this purpose. During the Ming dynasty, the requirements for the examinations became more demanding with the introduction of the "eight-legged essay" in 1487, which had a fixed structure. As the examinations progressed from the local to the central level, the difficulty also increased, with passing the tests earning the student a corresponding degree.

Officials were divided into a nine-rank system, with each rank consisting of two levels. The rank 1a was the highest, and the ladder ended with the rank 9b. They were paid wages, nominally in rice, according to their rank. Graduates of the provincial examinations were only given low ranks and appointed to unimportant official posts, but graduates of the palace examinations were awarded the prestigious title of jinshi (進士; lit. 'advanced scholar') and could expect to hold high-ranking positions. Over the course of the 276 years of Ming rule, there were 90 palace examinations, with 24,874 candidates successfully passing. In comparison, there were approximately 2000 to 4000 jinshi at any time, which accounted for only one in 10,000 adult males in all of China at the time. To put this into perspective, there were 100,000 holders of the lowest candidate title, shengyuan (生員; lit. 'student member'), in the 16th century. In the second half of the Ming period, there were 10,000 to 15,000 officials, but this number decreased to only 5,400 at the beginning of the dynasty.

The maximum tenure for officials was nine years, and their superiors evaluated their abilities every three years. Those with an excellent rating were promoted, while those who performed adequately remained in office. Officials who received unsatisfactory evaluations had their official grade lowered by one grade. In cases of obvious incompetence, the official could be dismissed or punished. High-ranking officials at the center were exempt from regular evaluation, but were still expected to voluntarily report any failures or mistakes to their superiors. Additionally, there were approximately 4,000 instructors in the county and prefecture Confucian schools who underwent similar evaluations every nine years. The Supervisorate of Imperial Instruction (詹事府) was responsible for educating the heir apparent, and this office was led by the Grand Supervisor of Instruction (詹事) of the rank 3a.

=== Lesser functionaries ===
Civil officials, who were appointed to positions in the state administration after successfully passing examinations, were subordinated by a large number of rank-and-file employees and assistants known as "lesser functionaries" (吏; li) who were not included in the official hierarchy. Their number was at least four times higher than that of senior officials, and one estimate suggests that there may have been more than 100,000 of them throughout the country. These functionaries held routine clerical and technical tasks in offices, but they should not be confused with even lower-ranking guards, couriers, and carriers. Lesser functionaries were graded every nine years, and the most successful among them could obtain the lowest official rank of the ninth class, but the possibility of promotion to higher positions in the administration was practically non-existent. (Note: During the Han dynasty, it was possible for a competent individual to advance to the role of prime minister, regardless of their initial position within the administration. However, as the Tang dynasty progressed, a divide began to form between lower and higher ranking officials, although there was still some potential for upward mobility. This divide became increasingly difficult to overcome during the Yuan dynasty, as higher bureaucratic positions were often filled by non-Chinese candidates. The Ming dynasty continued to maintain a distinction between higher and lower officials, but now all officials were of Chinese descent.)

One of the advantages of lesser functionaries over civil officials was their ability to stay in one place. Unlike civil officials, who often had to move every few years to a different and often distant region, lesser functionaries were able to provide continuity in state administration at the local level. Their presence was crucial in ensuring the smooth functioning of local authorities. This was because their senior officials, who were often unfamiliar with local customs and sometimes even the language, heavily relied on the loyal cooperation of their subordinates.

== Nine-rank system ==
Officials were organized into a nine-rank system (九品官人法; jiupin guanren fa; 'method of the classification of officials into nine ranks'). Each rank (品; pin) had two levels: senior (正; zheng) and junior (從; cong). The highest rank was the senior first rank (正一品; zheng yipin; marked as 1a), and the lowest was the junior ninth rank (從九品; cong jiupin; marked as 9b). In total, there were 18 ranks, which were further divided into 42 levels. Eunuchs were classified within the senior eighth to senior fourth ranks of officials, while military officers were ranked from senior first to junior sixth rank, with a total of 30 levels.

Ranking of selected functions in state administration
Heads of offices and unit commanders are marked in bold.
Rank	Civil official	Censorate	Military officers	Eunuch
1a	Three Ducal Ministers, **Grand Chancellor** (until 1380)		**Commissioner-in-Chief**	did not exist
1b	Three Solitaries, **Chief Administrator of the Branch Secretariat** (until 1376)	**Censor-in-Chief** (until 1380)	Vice Commissioner-in-Chief	did not exist
2a	**Minister** (since 1380), Vice Administrator of the Branch Secretariat (until 1376)	**Censor-in-Chief** (since 1380)	Assistant Commissioner-in-Chief, **Regional Commissioner**	did not exist
2b	Assistant Administrator of the Branch Secretariat (until 1376), **Administration Commissioner** (since 1376)		Regional Vice Commissioner	did not exist
3a	Vice Minister (since 1380), **Transmission Commissioner**, **Chief Minister of the Court of Judicature and Revision**, **Shuntian Prefectural Governor**	Vice Censor-in-Chief, **Surveillance Commissioner**	Assistant Regional Commissioner, **Guard Commander**	did not exist
3b	Administration Vice Commissioner		Guard Vice Commander	did not exist
4a	**Prefect**	Assistant Censor-in-Chief, Surveillance Vice Commissioner	Assistant Guard Commander	**Eunuch Director**
4b	**Chancellor of the Imperial University**, Assistant Administration Commissioner			
5a	**Grand Secretary**, **Chancellor of the Hanlin Academy**, Ministerial Director, Vice Prefect	Assistant Surveillan Commissioner	**Battalion Commander**	
5b	**Subprefecture Magistrate**		Guard Judge, Battalion Vice Commander	
6a	Ministerial Secretary, Assistant Prefect		**Company Commander**	
6b	Prefectural Judge, Subprefectural Vice Magistrate		Battalion Judge	
7a	**County Magistrate**	Investigating Censor, **Chief Supervising Secretary**	did not exist	
7b	Assistant Subprefectural Magistrate		did not exist	
8a	County Vice Magistrate		did not exist	
8b			did not exist	did not exist
9a	Assistant County Magistrate		did not exist	did not exist
9b	Prefectural Instructor		did not exist	did not exist

== See also ==
- Architecture of the Ming dynasty
- Culture of the Ming dynasty
- Economy of the Ming dynasty
- Government of the Han dynasty
- Government of the Qing dynasty
- History of the Ming dynasty
- Political systems of Imperial China
