= Longwen (Irgen Gioro) =

Longwen (隆文, ?–1841) was a grand chancellor of the Irgen Gioro clan and the Manchu Plain Red Banner during Daoguang era.

== Biography ==
Longwen's ancestor Dalbangga of Yarhū became a member of Nurhaci's tribal forces during the founding of the Manchu Khannate. Longwen obtained the Jinshi degree in 1808 and was selected as a student (庶吉士) in the Hanlin Academy. After initially serving as an official in the Ministry of Justice, he was dismissed for an offense but later reinstated and appointed a Lecturer in the Hanlin Academy. He was subsequently promoted to the position of Grand Secretariat Academician (內閣學士) and served as Imperial Resident in Tibet (駐藏大臣) during the Daoguang emperor's reign. He later held the offices of Deputy Minister of Personnel, Deputy Minister of Revenue, Minister of Justice, Minister of War, and Grand Councillor. He was also repeatedly assigned as an imperial commissioner to investigate important judicial cases. During the First Opium War, Longwen and General Yishan jointly directed military affairs in Guangdong, but the two disagreed on policies and military procedures. Shortly after arriving in Guangdong, Longwen fell ill and died with frustration and anxiety. He was posthumously awarded the name Duanyi (端毅, "Upright and Resolute").

His counsins Longyun (隆雲) and Longrui (隆濬) were also Jinshi graduates.
