= Wang Dan (Song dynasty) =

Song dynasty politician

- 王旦
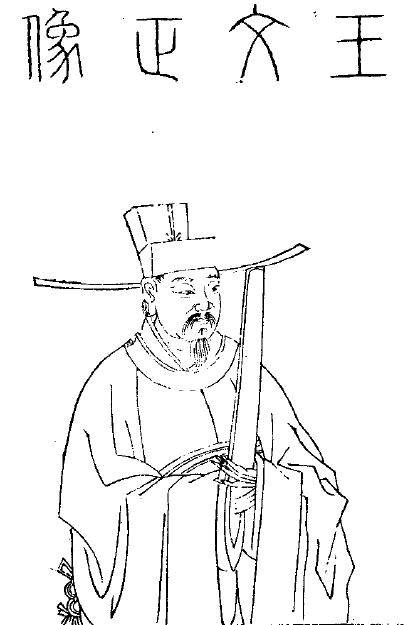
- Illustration by Kong Lianqing, from the 1850 book Gu Sheng Xian Xiang Zhuan Lüe

Grand councilor of the Song dynasty
- In office March 27, 1006 – August 15, 1017
- Monarch: Emperor Zhenzong

Personal details
- Born: 957 or January 958 Unknown, Later Zhou
- Died: October 6, 1017 (aged 59–60) Kaifeng, Song dynasty
- Spouse: Lady Zhao (趙)
- Children: Wang Yong (王雍), son; Wang Chong (王冲), son; Wang Su (王素), son; 4 daughters
- Parents: Wang You (王祐) (father); Lady Ren (任) (mother)
- Posthumous name: Wenzheng (文正)

Wang Dan
- Chinese: 王旦
Transcriptions
Standard Mandarin
- Hanyu Pinyin: Wáng Dàn
- Wade–Giles: Wang^{2} Tan^{4}

Wang Ziming
- Chinese: 王子明
Transcriptions
Standard Mandarin
- Hanyu Pinyin: Wáng Zǐmíng
- Wade–Giles: Wang^{2} Tzu^{3}-ming^{2}

Wang Dan (c. 957 – 6 October 1017), courtesy name Ziming, was a major politician in the Song dynasty, serving as the grand councilor from 1006 until shortly before his death in 1017. Well trusted by Emperor Zhenzong, Wang Dan was given plenipotentiary authority over some matters after 1008.

Wang Dan is generally remembered as a faithful and virtuous official, mainly because he kept a low profile, recruited talented men to the bureaucracy while blocking his notoriously unscrupulous colleague Wang Qinruo from advancing for most of his tenure. But Wang Dan also flattered and encouraged Emperor Zhenzong's excessive and ridiculous Taoist pursuits, for which he expressed regret on his deathbed.

== Early life ==
Wang Dan was born in 957 or January 958 during the Later Zhou, possibly in Wei County or Nanle County, where his father Wang You (王祐) served as a county magistrate during that period. His ancestral home was Shen County. When he was 3 years old, the Later Zhou was overthrown and replaced by the Song dynasty.

Wang Dan enjoyed studying from a young age. In 980 he passed the imperial examination with honors, and was assigned to govern Pingjiang County as a magistrate. The circuit fiscal commissioner (轉運使) Zhao Changyan (趙昌言) was very impressed by his governing, and betrothed his daughter to Wang Dan. In 984, after completing his assignment in Pingjiang, Wang Jiang was assigned to manage the silver mine in the Tan Prefecture. Through the recommendation of Tan's prefect He Chengju (何承矩), Wang Dan was transferred to the capital Kaifeng's Palace Library, where he worked as an assistant editorial director (著作佐郎). He worked on the compilations Wenyuan Yinghua and Shi Lei (詩類; "Poems"). He was promoted to assistant director of palace administration (殿中丞).

In 985, Wang Dan was assigned to Zheng Prefecture to serve as the controller-general (通判). Two years later he was transferred to Hao Prefecture. In 990, Wang Yucheng recommended him to become a circuit fiscal commissioner, but as Wang Dan preferred to work in the capital, he presented a paper and was assigned to work in the Historiography Institute. In 991, he became a drafter (知制誥), a post his father had filled just 10 years ago. He impressed many colleagues, and Li Hang (李沆) who graduated from the same examination class valued him highly. Qian Ruoshui (錢若水) was convinced he could become a grand councilor.

== Becoming a grand councilor ==
Zhao Guangyi (posthumously known as Emperor Taizong) died in May 997 and was succeeded by his son Zhao Heng (posthumously known as Emperor Zhenzong). Under the new monarch, Wang Dan was first made a drafter (舍人) in the Secretariat. A few months later, he became a Hanlin Academician while being put in charge of two offices: the Bureau of Personnel Evaluation (審官院) and the Memorial-Forwarding and Vetoing Office (通進銀台封駁司). It was said the young emperor had rather favorable impressions of him. When Qian Ruoshui offered to retire, he was asked by the emperor to recommend someone in the central government bureaucracy for promotion. Qian Ruoshui answered that he found Wang Dan suitable for important roles because he had the requisite "virtues and reputations". The emperor replied, "This is exactly the person in my mind."

In March 1000, Wang Dan and two other Hanlin Academicians were put in charge of the imperial examination to recruit new scholar-officials. Emerging from 10 days of seclusion in the examination rooms, Wang Dan was immediately made a Supervising Secretary (給事中) in the Chancellery as well as an Administrator of the Bureau of Military Affairs. In April 1001, Wang Dan became the Vice-Director (侍郎) of the Ministry of Works and Vice-Grand councilor (參知政事), which enabled him to participate in policy discussions in the Administration Chamber with the emperor.

== As grand councilor ==
During Wang Dan's tenure, the civil service examination system saw some important institutionalized developments, including:

- In 1007, the practice of protecting a candidate's anonymity was extended from the imperial examination in the capital to the departmental examinations in the provinces
- In 1015, the Bureau of Examination Copyists (謄錄院) was established to copy examination papers to prevent candidates' handwriting from being recognized by examiners
- Between 1007 and 1011, the official promotion system through controlled sponsorship was fully developed

Although Wang Dan's role in these changes is unclear, historian Edward Kracke argued that Wang Dan must be behind them, being not only an influential grand councilor, but also an experienced examiner.

Wang Dan also sponsored and recommended many talented men for promotion. At least 5 men he recommended became grand councilors: Kou Zhun (who had been grand councilor before), Li Di (李迪), Wang Zeng (王曾), Zhang Shixun (張士遜), and Lü Yijian (呂夷簡).

== Notes and references ==
- Toqto'a; et al., eds. (1345). Song Shi [History of Song] (in Chinese).
- Li Tao (1183). Xu Zizhi Tongjian Changbian [Extended Continuation to Zizhi Tongjian] (in Chinese).
- Cahill, Suzanne E. (1980). "Taoism at the Sung Court: The Heavenly Text Affair of 1008". Bulletin of Sung–Yüan Studies (16): 23–44. JSTOR 23497469.
- Hsü, Wen-hsiung (1976). "Wang Tan". In Franke, Herbert (ed.). Sung Biographies. Franz Steiner Verlag. pp. 1147–53. ISBN 3-515-02412-3.
- Lau Nap-yin; Huang K’uan-chung (2009). "Founding and Consolidation of the Sung Dynasty under T'ai-tsu (960–976), T'ai-tsung (976–997), and Chen-tsung (997–1022)". In Twichett, Denis C.; Fairbank, John K. (eds.). The Cambridge History of China, Volume 5, Part One: The Sung Dynasty and Its Precursors, 907–1279. Cambridge University Press. pp. 206–278. ISBN 978-0-521-81248-1.
- Wyatt, Don J. (2008). "In Pursuit of the Great Peace: Wang Dan and the Early Song Evasion of the 'Just War' Doctrine". Battlefronts Real and Imagined: War, Border, and Identity in the Chinese Middle Period. Palgrave Macmillan. pp. 75–110. ISBN 978-1-4039-6084-9.
