= Three Bureaus =

Ministry of Finance in the Northern Song Dynasty

The Three Bureaus (sansi, 三司) traditionally refer to the Bureau of Salt and Iron Monopoly, Tax Bureau, and Census Bureau that originated during the Song dynasty. However the Three Bureaus have been used to refer to different institutions at different points in Chinese history. In the Eastern Han (25-220), it included posts such as Defender-in-Chief (taiwei), Minister of Education (situ), and Minister of Works (sikong). In the Tang dynasty (618-907), it referred to the Censorate (yushitai), the Chancellery (menxia sheng), and the Palace Secretariat (zhongshu sheng). During the Ming dynasty, it referred to three provincial level institutions: the regional military commission, the Provincial Administration Commission, and the Provincial Surveillance Commission.

The bureaus of Salt and Iron, Tax, and Census were created during the Northern Song dynasty (960-1126). They were known as the State Finance Commission. Emperor Taizu of Song removed the household revenue section from the Imperial Secretariat (shangshu sheng) and split it into the three bureaus, collectively led by a state finance commissioner (sansishi) and a vice state finance commissioner (sansi fushi). Each bureau was also headed by their own respective commissioners. During the reform era of New Policies (Song dynasty) (1069-1076) led by Wang Anshi, the Three Bureaus were controlled by a Finance Planning Commission (zhizhi sansi tiaoli si) under the Imperial Secretariat (shangshu sheng). This organization was abolished during the Ming dynasty and replaced with the Ministry of Revenue.

Three Bureaus and their sections (Song dynasty):

- Bureau of Salt and Iron Monopoly (鹽鐵司) - responsible for industries related to public work, notably the production and distribution or merchandise of salt, but also other areas such as the production of weaponry
  - Military (bing'an)
  - Armaments (zhou'an)
  - Market tax (shangshui'an)
  - Capital supply (duyan'an)
  - Tea (cha'an)
  - Iron (tie'an)
  - Special preparations (she'an)
- Tax Bureau (度支司) - responsible for state revenue and expenditure, and the transport and distribution of tribute grain (a type of tax in the form of grain used to feed the officialdom and court in the capital)
  - Gifts and presentations (shangji'an)
  - Coins and silk (qianbo'an)
  - Grain supplies (liangliao'an)
  - Price stabilization (changping'an)
  - Transport (fayu'an)
  - Horses (ji'an)
  - State grain (hudou'an)
  - Officials (baiguan'an)
- Census Bureau (戶部司) - responsible for the registration of households, tax registers, organized taxation, and corvée (or replacement in money), as well as special monopolies such as the production of alcoholic beverages and yeast
  - Summer tax (hushu'an)
  - Prefectural remittances (shanggong'an)
  - Palace construction (xiuzao'an)
  - Yeast (qu'an)
  - Clothing and rations (yiliang'an)
