= Ministry of War =

Ministry of War may refer to:

- Ministry of War (imperial China) (c. 600–1912)
- Chinese Republic Ministry of War (1912–1946)
- Ministry of War (Kingdom of Bavaria) (1808–1919)
- Ministry of War (Brazil) (1815–1999)
- Ministry of War (Estonia) (1918–1928; 1937-1940)
- Ministry of War (France) (1791–1947)
- Ministry of War (Iran) (until the 1950s)
- Ministry of War (Italy) (1861–1947)
- Ministry of War (pre-modern Japan) (702–1872)
- Ministry of War (Japan) (1872–1945)
- Ministry of War (Peru) (1920–1987)
- Ministry of War (Portugal) (1820–1974)
- Ministry of War (Prussia) (1808–1919)
- Ministry of War of the Russian Empire (1802–1917)
- Ministry of War of Saxony (1831–1919)
- Ministry of War of Württemberg (1806–1919)

== See also ==
- Ministry of defence, a type of government department
- War Department
- War cabinet, a committee formed by a government in a time of war
- Chamberlain war ministry, the United Kingdom government 1939–1940
- Churchill war ministry, the United Kingdom government 1940–1945
- Ministry of War Transport (United Kingdom, 1941–1946)
