= Funing (Irgen Gioro) =

Funing (福寧, 1739–1814) was a Qing official of the Irgen Gioro clan from Manchu Plain Blue Banner. He served as Provincial Treasurer of Shaanxi (陝西布政使), Governors of Hubei, Shandong, and Henan, Viceroys of Huguang and Liangjiang, and Commander of the Plain White Mongol Banner (正白旗蒙古都統).

== Biography ==
Funing began his career as a bithesi (筆帖式, imperial secretariat clerk) in the Ministry of War to a director in the Ministry of Works. He was appointed office position in Gansu in 1768 and later became Provincial Treasurer of Shaanxi. In 1790 he was promoted to Governor of Hubei and incorporated into the Plain Blue Manchu Banner. He subsequently served as Governor of Shandong and Henan, and later as Viceroy of Huguang, where he took part in suppressing the White Lotus Rebellion. Appointed Viceroy of Liangjiang in 1795, Funing remained in Hubei to direct military operations against White Lotus and Miao insurgents. He captured the rebel leader Hu Zhengzhong (胡正中) and was rewarded with the honorary title of Taizi Shaobao (太子少保, "Junior Protector of Crown Prince"). However, the prolonged campaign led to criticism, and he was dismissed in 1798.

Later placed in charge of military logistics in Sichuan, Funing became implicated in administrative irregularities and the killing of surrendered rebels. He was stripped of office and exiled to Ili, though he was eventually pardoned. After service in Tibet, he returned to Beijing and was appointed Commander of the Plain White Mongol Banner in 1804. Retiring in 1806, he was later prosecuted for financial misconduct dating from his earlier appointments and died in prison in 1814.
