= Bureau of Military Affairs =

Chinese privy council, Tang-Yuan dynasties

The Bureau of Military Affairs (Chinese: 樞密院; pinyin: Shūmìyuàn; lit. 'Privy Court') was the central government agency in charge of a state's military forces during the Five Dynasties and Ten Kingdoms period, Liao dynasty, Song dynasty and Yuan dynasty. It was headed by the Shumishi (Chinese: 樞密使).

== History ==
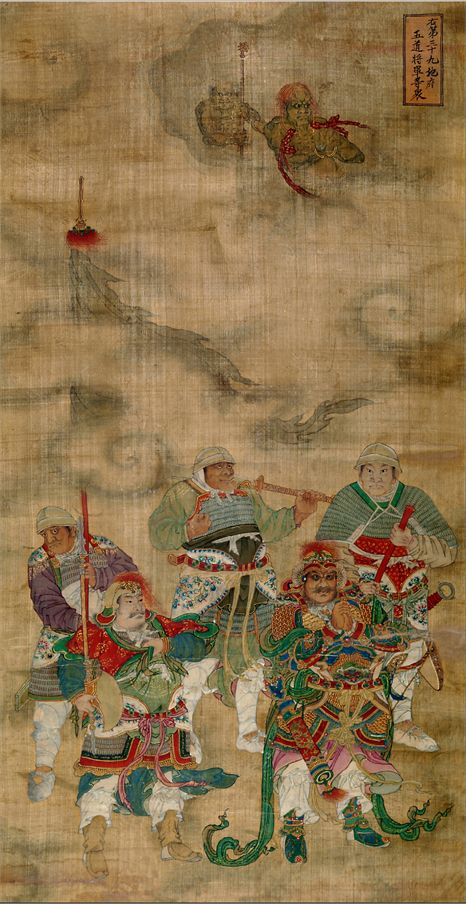
Warriors in armour, Song dynasty painting

=== Origin ===
The Shumiyuan (Bureau of Military Affairs) was created by Emperor Daizong of Tang (r. 762-779) for provisional palace secretary work. This bureau was staffed with eunuchs. Although assignments to the Shumiyuan were not regularized, the secretaries wielded great power and were able to influence accession to the throne as well as the appointment and dismissal of chancellors. The two Shumishi ("palace secretaries") and the commanders of the Shence Army were together called the "four nobles" due to their immense influence.

During the Later Liang dynasty (907-923), the Office for the Veneration of Governance (Chongzhengyuan) was founded for the administration of military matters by state officials. The Later Tang dynasty (923-936) changed the name to Shumiyuan. Its head, the Shumishi, assisted the Left Grand Chancellor and specialized in military affairs. This office was further elevated during the Song dynasty (960-1279) to parallel the Zhongshu Sheng, which was responsible for civilian matters, while the Shumiyuan was responsible for military affairs. They were called the "two offices" or the "two places". The Zhongshu Sheng was the "Western Office" while the Shumiyuan was the "Eastern Office".

The Shumishi had a deputy called the Vice Military Affairs Commissioner (shumi fushi). The notaries of the Shumiyuan were called qianshu shumiyuan shi while the vice notaries were called tong qianshu shumiyuan shi. Between 1078 and 1089, the commissioner and vice commissioner were called zheng zhangguan and fu zhangguan. Near the end of the Northern Song period (960-1126), numerous officials held the title of Shumishi as an honorific. The title was often held concurrently by the Grand Chancellor. During the Southern Song period (1127-1279), the Shumi Fushi also officially participated in governmental affairs.

The Shumiyuan was divided into six departments corresponding to the Six Ministries of Shangshu Sheng. They were headed by a Recipient of Edicts (chengzhi) and each department had one or two Vice Recipients of Edicts (fu chengzhi). The number of departments increased to more than 20 by the beginning of the Southern Song and were reduced back down to the traditional six and an additional department for miscellaneous matters.

=== Decline ===
In the Khitan Liao dynasty (907-1125), the Shumiyuan was only responsible for Han Chinese military units. It was called the "Southern" or "Chinese" Bureau of Military Affairs (nan shumiyuan). Emperor Shizong of Liao (r. 947-950) founded a Shumiyuan for Khitans that was divided between a northern and southern department. The northern department was responsible for military affairs while the southern department civilian affairs. Similarly, the Jurchens of the Jin dynasty (1115–1234) founded a Shumiyuan in 1123 to deal with Khitan and Han Chinese military units. The Chief Military Command (du yuanshuai fu) was renamed by Wanyan Liang (r. 1149-1160) to Shumiyuan. Emperor Zhangzong of Jin (r. 1189-1208) changed the name back in 1206 but chose to call it Shumiyuan again in 1208.

Under the Mongol-led Yuan dynasty (1279-1368), the post of Shumishi was held by the heir apparent. In practice, the post was left vacant and the Shumiyuan was guided by a deputy who was in de facto control over the bureau.

The founder of the Ming dynasty (1368-1644), Zhu Yuanzhang (r. 1368-1398), abolished the term Shumiyuan in 1361 during his uprising and replaced it with the Chief Military Command (da dudu fu).

== See also ==
- Ministry of War (Imperial China)
