= Board of Works =

Board of Works may refer to

- Metropolitan Board of Works, a former governmental department overseeing public works in London, UK
- Ministry of Works of imperial China, a former governmental department overseeing its public works
- The Melbourne and Metropolitan Board of Works operates under the Melbourne and Metropolitan Board of Works Act 1958 for the benefit of people in metropolitan Melbourne.
- Office of Public Works, a revised name for the government agency in Ireland originally known as Board of Works.
