= Military Affairs Commission =

Supreme military command of the Nationalist government of the Republic of China

Military Affairs Commission of the National Government
- 國民政府軍事委員會; Guómínzhèngfǔ Jūnshì Wěiyuánhuì
- Flag of the chairman of the Military Affairs Commission

Agency overview
- Formed: 1 July 1925; 101 years ago
- Dissolved: 15 May 1946; 80 years ago
- Agency executive: Chiang Kai-shek, Chairman; He Yingqin, Chief of the General Staff

Military Affairs Commission
- Traditional Chinese: 國民政府軍事委員會
- Simplified Chinese: 国民政府军事委员会
- Literal meaning: National Government Military Commission
Transcriptions
Standard Mandarin
- Hanyu Pinyin: Guómínzhèngfǔ Jūnshì Wěiyuánhuì

The Military Affairs Commission (MAC) of the Nationalist Government, chaired by Generalissimo Chiang Kai-shek during the Second Sino-Japanese War and World War II, directed the command of the National Revolutionary Army of the Republic of China.

== Organizational structure ==
It was reorganized beginning on January 17, 1938, in the following way:

- Chairman - Chiang Kai-shek
- Military Commissioners
- Chief of the General Staff - He Yingqin
  - Board of Military Operations
  - Ministry of War
  - Board of Military Training
  - Board of Political Training
  - Directorate General of Courts Martial
  - Commission on Aeronautical Affairs
  - Military Personnel Bureau
  - Military Advisory Council
- Main Office of the Military Affairs Commission
- Aides Office
- Investigation Statistics Bureau
- Councillors Office
- Commanders of Military Regions
- Commander in Chief, Navy
- Commander in Chief, Air Force
- Rear Area Services Department
- Air Defense Commanders
- Garrison Commanders

== List of leaders ==
No.	Portrait	Name (Birth–Death)	Term of office		Political party	Head of State
Chairman of the Military Affairs Commission (軍事委員會主席)
1		Wang Jingwei 汪兆銘; Wāng Zhàomíng (1883–1944)	1 July 1925	9 April 1926	Kuomintang	Wang Jingwei (Co-serving)
1		Wang Jingwei 汪兆銘; Wāng Zhàomíng (1883–1944)	282 days		Kuomintang	Wang Jingwei (Co-serving)
2		Chiang Kai-shek 蔣中正; Jiǎng Zhōngzhèng (1887–1975)	16 April 1926	10 March 1927	Kuomintang	Tan Yankai
2		Chiang Kai-shek 蔣中正; Jiǎng Zhōngzhèng (1887–1975)	328 days		Kuomintang	Tan Yankai
During this interval, the MAC was headed by a presidium.
3		Hu Hanmin 胡漢民; Hú Hànmín (1879–1936)	20 September 1927	4 January 1928	Kuomintang	Tan Yankai
3		Hu Hanmin 胡漢民; Hú Hànmín (1879–1936)	106 days		Kuomintang	Tan Yankai
(2)		Chiang Kai-shek 蔣中正; Jiǎng Zhōngzhèng (1887–1975)	7 February 1928	7 November 1928	Kuomintang	Tan Yankai
(2)		Chiang Kai-shek 蔣中正; Jiǎng Zhōngzhèng (1887–1975)	7 February 1928	7 November 1928	Kuomintang	Chiang Kai-shek (Co-serving)
(2)		Chiang Kai-shek 蔣中正; Jiǎng Zhōngzhèng (1887–1975)	274 days		Kuomintang	Chiang Kai-shek (Co-serving)
MAC abolished during this interval
Chairman of the Military Affairs Commission (軍事委員會委員長)
(2)		Chiang Kai-shek 蔣中正; Jiǎng Zhōngzhèng (1887–1975)	6 March 1932	15 May 1946	Kuomintang	Lin Sen
(2)		Chiang Kai-shek 蔣中正; Jiǎng Zhōngzhèng (1887–1975)	6 March 1932	15 May 1946	Kuomintang	Chiang Kai-shek (Co-serving)
(2)		Chiang Kai-shek 蔣中正; Jiǎng Zhōngzhèng (1887–1975)	14 years, 70 days		Kuomintang	Chiang Kai-shek (Co-serving)
