= Shangshu Sheng =

Imperial Chinese government department responsible for all bureaucratic functions

Chinese name
- Traditional Chinese: 尚書省
- Simplified Chinese: 尚书省
- Literal meaning: palace/department of the imperial secretary
Transcriptions
Standard Mandarin
- Hanyu Pinyin: Shàngshū Shěng
- Wade–Giles: Shang^{4}-shu^{1} Sheng^{3}

Vietnamese name
- Vietnamese: Thượng thư tỉnh

Korean name
- Hangul: 상서성
Transcriptions
- Revised Romanization: Sangseo Seong
- McCune–Reischauer: Sangsŏ Seong

The Shangshu Sheng, sometimes translated as the Department of State Affairs, Imperial Secretariat, or Executive Bureau, was one of the departments of the Three Departments and Six Ministries government structure. It was the primary executive institution of imperial China, head of the Six Ministries, the Nine Courts, and the Three or Five Directorates. The Six Ministries consisted of the Ministry of Personnel, the Ministry of Revenue, the Ministry of Rites, the Ministry of War, the Ministry of Justice, and the Ministry of Works. The Department of State of Affairs existed in one form or another from the Han dynasty (206 BC – AD 9) until the Yuan dynasty (1271–1368), but was never re-established in the following Ming dynasty.

== History ==
The Department of State Affairs originated as one of the posts of the Six Chief Stewards (六尚, Liu Shang) that were responsible for headgear, wardrobe, food, the bath, the bedchamber, and correspondence and edicts (尚書, shàngshū) during the Qin dynasty. The position of Chief Steward for Writing was elevated in importance during the reign of Emperor Wu of Han (r. 141–87 BC), who tried to escape the influence of the Grand Chancellor and Censor-in-Chief (御史大夫, yushi dafu) by relying on other officials. Emperor Guangwu of Han (r. AD 25–57) created the Department of State Affairs under the Chief Steward for Writing, organizing it as the head of the six sections of government. It was headed by a director (令, ling) and a vice-director (僕射, puye), assisted by aides (丞, cheng) "of the left and right side" and 36 attendant gentlemen (侍郎, shilang), six for each section, as well as 18 clerks (令史, lingshi), three for each section. These six sections later became the Six Ministries and their chief stewards and the director and the vice-director of the Department of State Affairs were collectively known as the Eight Executives (八座, bazuo).

The power of the Department of State Affairs decreased in the succeeding Wei and Jin dynasties as some of its functions and authority were delegated to the Central Secretariat and Chancellery. The posts of director and vice-director also became less important as it was bestowed upon high ministers and noble family members who did not participate in the real administrative work of the department. The paperwork became the purview of clerks, whose increasing influence frightened Emperor Wu of Liang. Emperor Wu decreed that only members of the nobility should become clerks, but none of the nobles were willing to assign their sons to such work. Members of the department refused to cooperate with the emperor and resisted any changes to administration. The Department of State Affairs in the Sixteen Kingdoms and the Northern Dynasties tended to work more similarly to the Southern Dynasties over time but were dominated by "barbarian" peoples such as the Xianbei.

During the Sui dynasty (581–618), the post of director was often left vacant while two vice-directors, Gao Jiong and Yang Su, handled affairs.

During the Tang dynasty (618–907), the post of director continued to usually be left vacant. When it was filled, the position was held by the crown prince, as with Li Shimin (r. 626–649) and Li Shi (r. 779–804). To weaken the power of the vice-director, now de facto head of the institution, the position was divided between "left and right" vice-directors, the former being senior to the latter. At times the vice-directors were comparable in power with the grand chancellors and sometimes even superseded him. However by the mid-Tang period, the chancellors had regained their predominance and the vice-directors of the Department of State Affairs lost their default status as chancellors, needing to be specially and individually named as such to participate in policy-making discussions. Sometimes the Left Vice-Director of the Department of State Affairs was the same person as the Director of the Chancellery. Thereafter the department became a purely executive institution. The six sections of government were formally divided into the Six Ministries, each headed by a separate minister (shangshu). The six divisions were replicated at the prefectural level, each directly reporting to their respective ministries in the central government. In addition to the Six Ministries, the Department of State Affairs was also in charge of the Nine Courts and the Three or Five Directorates. The Department of State Affairs was one of the largest employers in the government and provided posts and income to many officials. The institution was abolished during the Mongolian Yuan dynasty (1271–1368), with sporadic attempts to reintroduce it in 1270, 1287, 1309, and 1311 due to financial difficulties. The attempts never lasted for more than a few years. It was never reëstablished in the following Ming dynasty.

== Nine Courts ==
The Nine Courts throughout most of Chinese history were:

The Nine Courts and Ministers
Court				Minister			
English	Chinese			English	Chinese		
English	Trad.	Simp.	Pinyin	English	Trad.	Simp.	Pinyin
Court of Imperial Sacrifices	太常寺		Tàichángsì	Minister of Ceremonies	太常		Tàicháng
Court of Imperial Entertainments	光祿寺	光祿寺	Guānglùsì	Minister of Imperial Entertainments	光祿勳	光禄勋	Guānglùxūn
Court of the Imperial Clan	宗正寺		Zōngzhèngsì	Minister of the Imperial Clan	宗正		Zōngzhèng
Court of the Imperial Stud	太僕寺	太仆寺	Tàipúsì	Minister Coachman	太僕	太仆	Tàipú
Court of the Imperial Treasury	太府寺		Tàifǔsì	Minister Steward	少府		Shàofǔ
Court of the Imperial Regalia	衛尉寺	卫尉寺	Wèiwèisì	Minister of the Guards	衛尉	卫尉	Wèiwèi
Court of State Ceremonial	鴻臚寺	鸿胪寺	Hónglúsì	Minister Herald	鴻臚	鸿胪	Hónglú
Court of the National Granaries	司農寺	司农寺	Sīnóngsì	Minister of Finance	司農	司农	Sīnóng
Court of Judicature and Revision	大理寺		Dàlǐsì	Minister of Justice	大理		Dàlǐ

== Three/Five Directorates ==
The Three or Five Directorates were originally the Directorates of Waterways, Imperial Manufactories, and Palace Buildings. In the Sui dynasty, the Directorate of Armaments or Palace Domestic Service was sometimes counted as one. The Sui and Tang dynasties also added the Directorate of Education to the list. The Directorate of Astronomy was added during the Song dynasty.

Three/Five Directorates
English	Chinese		
English	Trad.	Simp.	Pinyin
Directorate of Waterways	都水監	都水监	Dūshuǐjiān
Directorate for Imperial Manufactories	少府監	少府监	Shǎofǔjiān
Directorate for Palace Buildings	將作監	将作监	Jiāngzuòjiān
Directorate for Armaments	軍器監	军器监	Jūnqìjiān
Directorate of Palace Domestic Service	長秋監	长秋监	Chángqiūjiān
Directorate of Education	國子監	国子监	Guózǐjiān
Directorate of Astronomy	司天監	司天监	Sītiānjiān

== See also ==
- Zhongshu Sheng
- Menxia Sheng
