= Andong No clan =

Korean clan from North Gyeongsang Province

- Country: Korea
- Current region: Andong
- Founder: No Man

Andong No clan (Korean: 안동 노씨; Hanja: 安東 盧氏) is a Korean clan. Their bongwan is in Andong, North Gyeongsang Province, South Korea. According to the research in 2000, the number of Andong No clan was 3144. Their founder is No Man. He was a 5th son of No Hae. When he was a Hanlin Academy in Tang dynasty, he was dispatched to Silla. He was chosen as Prince of Andong (Hanja: 安東伯) during Silla period. No U (Hanja: 盧祐), a descendant of No Man, was appointed as Ministry of Personnel and was settled in Andong. Then, he began Andong No clan.

== See also ==
- Korean clan names of foreign origin
