= Namyang Song clan =

Korean clan from Gyeonggi Province

- Country: Korea
- Current region: Suwon
- Founder: Song Gyu

Namyang Song clan (Korean: 남양 송씨; Hanja: 南陽 宋氏) was one of the Korean clans. Their Bon-gwan was in Suwon, Gyeonggi Province. According to the research in 2000, the number of Namyang Song clan was 10183. Their founder was Song Gyu who was a Hanlin Academy in Tang dynasty. He was dispatched from Tang dynasty to Silla and served as Ministry of Personnel in Silla. He was settled in Namyang and began Namyang Song clan at a time when Silla was collapsed.

== See also ==
- Korean clan names of foreign origin
