= Ministry of Justice of China (disambiguation) =

Ministry of Justice of China may refer to:

- Ministry of Justice of the People's Republic of China, after 1954
- Ministry of Justice (Taiwan), or Ministry of Justice of the Republic of China, based in mainland China from 1912 to 1949
- Ministry of Justice (imperial China), before 1911
