= War Department =

War Department or Department of War may refer to current and historical ministries of defence, including:

- War Department (United Kingdom), 1747–1857
- War Office, British war department, 1857–1964
- United States Department of War, 1789–1947
- United States Department of Defense, 1947–present; using "Department of War" as a secondary name since 2025

== See also ==
- Ministry of War
- War cabinet
