= Ministry of Works (Imperial China) =

Imperial Chinese government ministry responsible for infrastructure

Chinese name
- Chinese: 工部
- Literal meaning: Works Department
Transcriptions
Standard Mandarin
- Hanyu Pinyin: Gōngbù
- Wade–Giles: Kung Pu

Manchu name
- Manchu script: ᠸᡝᡳᠯᡝᡵᡝ ᠵᡠᡵᡤᠠᠨ
- Möllendorff: weilere jurgan

The Ministry of Works or of Public Works was one of the Six Ministries under the Department of State Affairs in imperial China.

The Ministry of Works is also commonly translated into English as the Board of Works or of Public Works.

== History ==
The ministry was established during the Sui dynasty as one of the six functional divisions of the Department of State Affairs. It was also part of the same department during the Five Dynasties period and the Song dynasty. After the merger of the "three departments" (Zhongshu Sheng, Menxia Sheng and Shangshu Sheng), it was reassigned to the Zhongshu Sheng (Secretariat) in the Yuan Empire and later the Ming Empire. In 1380, the office of Secretariat was abolished and the ministries, including the Ministry of Works, became independent and continued to report directly to the emperor.

Under the Ming and Qing, it lost some influence in favor of agencies run by palace eunuchs, provincial coordinators, and governors. It was usually considered the weakest of the six ministries. During some periods (under the Southern Song and Yuan) it was merged with the Ministry of Justice.

The ministry was headed by the Minister of Shangshu (pinyin: shàng shū, Chinese: 尚書; Manchu: aliha amban), who had the Standard class, Rank 3 under the Changs (in the Nine-rank system); Secondary class, Rank 2 under the Song; Standard class, Rank 1 under the Jin, Yuan and Ming up to 1380; Standard class, Rank 2 under the Ming after 1380 and Qing; and Secondary class, Rank 1 under the Qing after 1730. During the Qing dynasty, there was one minister for the Manchu and another for the Chinese. He was assisted by two deputy ministers, called Shilang (pinyin: shì lang, Chinese: 侍郎; Manchu: ashan-i amban).

== Functions ==
Under the Ming, the Ministry of Works had charge of weights and measures, the construction and maintenance of transportation infrastructure (especially roads and canals), other government construction works (especially flood control projects), the manufacturing and provision of government equipment, the public exploitation of natural resources, and the hiring of artisans or laborers for temporary service. Permanent hires fell under the purview of the Ministry of Personnel.

In the Republic of China (Taiwan), the functions of this ministry are currently carried out by the following commission and ministry: Public Construction Commission and Transportation and Communications. Whereas in People's Republic of China the functions of this ministry are currently performed by the following ministries: Transport, Industry and Information Technology, Natural Resources, Water Resources and Housing and Urban–Rural Development

== See also ==
- Traditional Chinese measures
- Public Construction Commission
- Ministry of Transportation and Communications (Taiwan)
- Ministry of the Interior (Taiwan)
- Ministry of Transport (China)
- Ministry of Industry and Information Technology
- Ministry of Human Resources and Social Security
- Ministry of Natural Resources (China)
- Ministry of Water Resources (China)
- Ministry of Housing and Urban–Rural Development
