= Censorate =

Former Chinese imperial agency monitoring and investigating officials

Pre-Ming
- Traditional Chinese: 御史臺
- Simplified Chinese: 御史台
- Literal meaning: Terrace of Imperial Scribes/historians
Transcriptions
Standard Mandarin
- Hanyu Pinyin: Yùshǐ Tái
- Wade–Giles: Yü^{4}-shih^{3} t'ai^{2}

Ming, Qing
- Chinese: 都察院
- Literal meaning: Metropolitan/Chief/General Inspection Court
Transcriptions
Standard Mandarin
- Hanyu Pinyin: Dūchá Yuàn
- Wade–Giles: Tu^{1}-ch'a^{2} Yüan^{4}

Vietnamese name
- Vietnamese alphabet: Đô sát viện
- Chữ Hán: 都察院

The Censorate was a high-level supervisory agency in Imperial China, first established during the Qin dynasty (221–207 BC). It was a highly effective agency during the Mongol-led Yuan dynasty (1271–1368). During the Ming dynasty (1368–1644), the Censorate was a branch of the centralized bureaucracy, paralleling the Six Ministries and the five Chief Military Commissions, and was directly responsible to the emperor. The investigating censors were "the eyes and ears" of the emperor and checked administrators at each level to prevent corruption and malfeasance, a common feature of that period. Popular stories told of righteous censors revealing corruption as well as censors who accepted bribes. Generally speaking, they were feared and disliked, and had to move around constantly to perform their duties.

== Internal structure ==
The Censorate was divided into three branches (院).

- The Palace Branch (殿院) was responsible for monitoring the behavior of officials during audiences. It was staffed by in-palace enquiry censors (殿中侍御史).
- The Admonishment Branch (台院) was responsible for monitoring the behavior of the emperor, to ensure that he did not make mistakes and remind him of his duties. It was staffed by enquiry censors (侍御史).

- The Detection Branch (察院) was responsible for monitoring the behavior of local officials. Monitor censors (監察御史) would tour the country in circuits to ensure the proper discharge of the functions of government and good performance of local officials.

== Vietnam ==
Đô sát viện ấn (都察院印), the Great Seal of the Censorate of the Nguyễn dynasty.

During the Nguyễn dynasty a representative from the censorate served as a member of a government commission formed to create inscriptions for the 1 mạch cash coins.

== See also ==
- Central Commission for Discipline Inspection of the Chinese Communist Party
- Control Yuan (Republic of China)
- National Supervisory Commission (People's Republic of China)
- Three Departments and Six Ministries (Imperial China)
  - Department of Chancellery
  - Ministry of Personnel
  - Ministry of Justice (imperial China)
- Roman censor
- Council of Censors (Pennsylvania)
- Auditor general
