= Ministry of Revenue (Imperial China) =

Imperial Chinese government ministry

(Pre-Sui)
- Chinese: 度支
- Literal meaning: Going Over Expenses; Accounting; Treasurer
Transcriptions
Standard Mandarin
- Hanyu Pinyin: Dùzhī
- Wade–Giles: Tu-chih

(Sui)
- Chinese: 民部
- Literal meaning: Ministry of People; Census Ministry
Transcriptions
Standard Mandarin
- Hanyu Pinyin: Mínbù
- Wade–Giles: Min Pu

(Tang–Qing)
- Traditional Chinese: 戶部
- Simplified Chinese: 户部
- Literal meaning: Household(s) Ministry; Census Ministry
Transcriptions
Standard Mandarin
- Hanyu Pinyin: Hùbù
- Wade–Giles: Hu Pu

Manchu name
- Manchu script: ᠪᠣᡳᡤᠣᠨ ᡳ ᠵᡠᡵᡤᠠᠨ
- Möllendorff: boigon i jurgan

The Ministry or Board of Revenue was one of the Six Ministries under the Department of State Affairs in imperial China.

== Name ==
The term "Ministry of Revenue" or "Board of Revenues" is an English gloss of the department's purview. It is also similarly translated as the Finance Ministry or Board of Finance. In Chinese, the various names of the department never referred to the government's monetary income. Instead, prior to the Sui dynasty, it was known as the Dùzhī from its role in overseeing government expenses. Under the Sui, it was known as the "Ministry of People" (Mínbù) from its role overseeing the census and its associated taxation. From the Tang to the Qing, it was known as the "Households Department" (Hùbù), again from its role in overseeing a census reckoned in households and associated taxation.

== Administrative level ==
- Tang dynasty & Song dynasty: subordinate to the Department of State Affairs
- Yuan dynasty: subordinate to the Secretariat
- Ming dynasty: originally subordinate to the Secretariat, relatively autonomous after 1380, coordinated by the Grand Secretariat after the mid-1400s

== Functions ==
Charles O. Hucker wrote that the Ministry of Revenue was "in general charge of population and land censures, assessment and collection of taxes, and storage and distribution of government revenues." The ministry was usually divided into specialized bureaus:

- Census Bureau (戶部司)
- General Accounts Bureau (度支司)
- Treasury Bureau (金部司)
- Granaries Bureau (倉部司)

Each bureau was headed by a director (郎中). The ministry was headed by a minister (尚書).

In the Republic of China (Taiwan), the functions of this ministry are currently carried out by the Ministry of Finance. Whereas in the People's Republic of China the functions of this ministry are currently performed by the homonymous Ministry of Finance.

== See also ==
- Hoppo
- Ministry of Finance of the People's Republic of China
- Ministry of Finance (Taiwan)

== References and further reading ==
- Hucker, Charles O. (1985). A Dictionary of Official Titles in Imperial China. Stanford University Press. p. 258.
- "Ministry (Board) of Finance," H.S. Brunnert, V.V. Hagelstrom Present Day Political Organization of China (1912: reprinted: Routledge, 2012), pp. 119–121.
- Sun, E-Tu Zen (1962), "The Board of Revenue in Nineteenth-Century China", Harvard Journal of Asiatic Studies, 24: 175–228, doi:10.2307/2718648, JSTOR 2718648 Accessed 19 June 2025.
- von Glahn, Richard (2020), "Modalities of the Fiscal State in Imperial China", Journal of Chinese History, 4 (1): 1–29, doi:10.1017/jch.2019.15
- Huang, Ray (1998). "The Ming Fiscal Administration". In Twitchett, Denis C.; Mote, Frederick W. (eds.). The Cambridge History of China. Cambridge: Cambridge University Press. pp. 106–71.
- Mote, Frederick W. (1999). Imperial China: 900–1800. Cambridge, MA: Harvard University Press. ISBN 978-0-674-01212-7.
- Wang, Yuhua (2022). The Rise and Fall of Imperial China: The Social Origins of State Development. Princeton, NJ: Princeton University Press. doi:10.23943/princeton/9780691215174.001.0001. ISBN 9780691215174.
