= Chinese Republic Ministry of War =

The Ministry of War (Chinese: 軍政部) of the Republic of China was the cabinet level department charged with administering the Army of the Chinese Republic from 1912 to 1946.

== Organizational structure ==
The Ministry of War supervised:

- General Affairs Department
- Military Affairs Service
- Quartermaster Service
- Ordnance Service
- Medical Service

== Ministers of War ==
- Feng Yuxiang (馮玉祥): 1928–1929
- Lu Zhonglin (鹿鍾麟): 1929
- Chen Yi (陳儀): 1929
- Lu Zhonglin (鹿鍾麟): 1929
- Zhu Shouguang (朱綬光): 1929–1930
- He Yingqin (何應欽): 1930 - 1944
- Chen Cheng (陳誠): 1944 - 1945

== See also ==
- Imperial Chinese Ministry of War
- Ministry of National Defense of the Republic of China
- National Revolutionary Army
