= Ministry of Justice (imperial China) =

Imperial Chinese government ministry responsible for judicial processes and penalties

(Pre-Sui)
- Chinese: 都官
- Literal meaning: Capital officials
Transcriptions
Standard Mandarin
- Hanyu Pinyin: Dūguān
- Wade–Giles: Tu-kuan

(Sui–Qing)
- Chinese: 刑部
- Literal meaning: Punishment(s) Department
Transcriptions
Standard Mandarin
- Hanyu Pinyin: Xíng Bù
- Wade–Giles: Hsing Pu

Manchu name
- Manchu script: ᠪᡝᡳᡩᡝᡵᡝ ᠵᡠᡵᡤᠠᠨ
- Möllendorff: beidere jurgan

The Ministry or Board of Justice was one of the Six Ministries under the Department of State Affairs in imperial China.

== Functions ==
Under the Ming, the Ministry of Justice had charge of most judicial and penal processes, but had no authority over the Censorate or the Grand Court of Revision.

In the Republic of China (Taiwan), the functions of this ministry are currently carried out by the homonymous Ministry of Justice (Taiwan). Whereas in People's Republic of China the functions of this ministry are also currently performed by a homonymous ministry, the Ministry of Justice (China).

== See also ==
- Chinese law
- Capital punishment & Torture in China
- Death by a Thousand Cuts & the Nine Familial Exterminations
- Ministry of Justice (China)
- Ministry of Justice (Taiwan)
