= Dalisi =

Central government judicial body in ancient China

Chinese name
- Chinese: 大理寺
Transcriptions
Standard Mandarin
- Hanyu Pinyin: Dàlǐ Sì
- Wade–Giles: Ta^{4}-li^{3} Szu^{4}

Jisi
- Chinese: 棘寺
- Literal meaning: Thorn or Thorn-Bush Office
Transcriptions
Standard Mandarin
- Hanyu Pinyin: Jí Sì
- Wade–Giles: Chi Szu

Vietnamese name
- Vietnamese: Đại lý tự

Manchu name
- Manchu script: ᠪᡝᡳᡩᡝᠨ ᠪᡝ ᡨᡠᠸᠠᠨᠴᡳᡥᡳᠶᠠᡵᠠ ᠶᠠᠮᡠᠨ
- Möllendorff: beiden be tuwancihiyara yamun

The Dalisi or Dali Si, variously translated as the Court of Judicature and Revision, the Court of Judicial Review, and the Office of Justice, was the supreme court for criminal cases under most of the dynasties of imperial China. It was also referred to as Jisi or Ji Si because interrogations of criminals sometimes took place under thorn trees. Ancient Vietnam followed ancient China's precedent and also established a similar institution.
