= Ministry of Personnel =

East Asian imperial government ministry

Chinese name
- Chinese: 吏部
- Literal meaning: Officials Department
Transcriptions
Standard Mandarin
- Hanyu Pinyin: Lìbù
- Wade–Giles: Li Pu

Vietnamese name
- Vietnamese alphabet: Lại Bộ / Bộ Lại
- Hán-Nôm: 吏部 / 部吏

Korean name
- Hangul: 이조
- Hanja: 吏曹

Manchu name
- Manchu script: ᡥᠠᡶᠠᠨ ᡳ ᠵᡠᡵᡤᠠᠨ
- Möllendorff: hafan i jurgan

The Ministry of Personnel, also known as the Ministry of Civil Service, was one of the Six Ministries under the Department of State Affairs in imperial China, Korea, and Vietnam.

== Functions ==
Under the Ming, the Ministry of Personnel was in charge of civil appointments, merit ratings (司勋司), promotions, and demotions of officials, as well as granting of honorific titles. Military appointments, promotions, and demotions fell under the purview of the Ministry of War.

In the Republic of China (Taiwan), the functions of this ministry are currently carried out by the Directorate-General of Personnel Administration. Whereas in People's Republic of China the functions of this ministry are currently performed by the Ministry of Human Resources and Social Security.

== See also ==
- Imperial examination
- Scholar-bureaucrat or mandarin
- Examination Yuan
- Directorate-General of Personnel Administration
- Ministry of Human Resources and Social Security.
