= Ministry of War (Imperial China) =

Imperial Chinese government ministry in charge of the military

Chinese name
- Chinese: 兵部
- Literal meaning: Army Department; Warfare Department
Transcriptions
Standard Mandarin
- Hanyu Pinyin: Bīngbù
- Wade–Giles: Ping Pu

Manchu name
- Manchu script: ᠴᠣᡠᡥᠠᡳ ᠵᡠᡵᡤᠠᠨ
- Möllendorff: coohai jurgan

The Ministry of War was one of Six Ministries under the Department of State Affairs in imperial China.

== Name ==
The Ministry of War is also commonly translated as the Ministry or Board of Defense.

== Function ==
During the Ming dynasty, the Ministry of War had control over appointments, promotions, and demotions of military officers; the maintenance of military installations, equipment, and weapons; and administration over the imperial Chinese post or courier network.

=== Courier network ===
Workers found jobs at Relay Stations or Post Offices during the Ming dynasty in multiple ways. Some were directly appointed by the Emperor. In some cases, local indigenous leaders received these appointments. The subordinate positions were filled by members of the leader's entourage, including cooks, stable hands and innkeepers. Thereafter the Stationmaster became an inherited position, in some cases for over 100 years.

At more isolated frontier stations, exiles, ex-criminals and prisoners of war filled the positions. Formerly high officials who had been convicted of crimes ranging from malversation (corrupt behaviour in a position of trust), to bribe-taking or drunkenness received these posts as punishment.

By 1360 CE, local families were part of the relay system and required, depending upon their wealth, to supply the station with a horse, grain, or labor. Such posts were regarded as a punishment, ensuring that only minimal qualifications were needed. However, Relay Station Masters had to be responsible for the maintenance of boats at water stations and horses at horse stations as well as supplying travelers according to their rank with appropriate equipment, servants and food to accommodate their journey.

The wellbeing of official messengers and envoys was the primary concern of the Relay Station Master.

==== Organization ====
The hierarchy within these stations was clear. The Post Master or Relay Station Master was in charge. Under him were the staff performing jobs ranging from stable-hand or inn/tavern staff to warehouse duties managing the station's supplies. The pay for Masters varied based upon the importance of the station. Compensation was in the form of grain every lunar month, and later switched into silver ranging from fifteen to twenty-two taels per year. Despite this rather high pay, no individual during the Ming dynasty ever sought to become Relay Station Master, due to the associated risks. These risks came both from the travelers and, especially in the more isolated stations from bandits or foreign armies could target station or the travel routes. Station Masters could be harassed, beaten, or even murdered depending upon the whims of high-ranking travelers. These risks were not confined to the Station Master; banditry and invading armies did not distinguish their foes by rank. For every relay station as many as eight express post stations were present.

==== Post stations ====
Postmaster positions were a much less risky occupation. Most express post station masters did not suffer any forms of harassment, injury, or death from their clients. Post stations were smaller and less diplomatically important than relay stations. The staff and compensation were much smaller. Each express post station had between four and ten staffers serving as foot post soldiers and one postmaster whose primary duties were to oversee them and ensure mail delivery. The staff were typically local farming community youth. Apart from good health the job had no other qualifications. At isolated post stations, rank and file positions were filled by pardoned death-row criminals. Pay was between four and seven taels of silver per year.

== Reform ==
In November 1910 the Qing dynasty, as part of its New Policies, replaced the old Six Ministries with eleven new ministries. One of them was the Ministry of the Army, which had been created in November 1906 when the old Ministry of War was changed. One of the main differences between the two organizations was that instead of being entirely an administrative and logistical institution staffed by civilian officials, military officers were given a greater role, and there was a General Staff Council within the ministry. It also included the Naval Commission, but that was turned into a separate Ministry of the Navy in December 1910.

In the Republic of China (Taiwan), the functions of this ministry are currently carried out by the Ministry of National Defense. Whereas in People's Republic of China the functions of this ministry are currently performed by a homonymous ministry, the Ministry of National Defense.

== See also ==
- Military history of China before 1911
- Chinese Republic Ministry of War
- Ministry of National Defense (China)
- Ministry of National Defense (Republic of China)
