= Zhongshu Sheng =

Imperial Chinese government department

Central Secretariat
- 中书省; Zhongshu Sheng
- Tang seal of the Zhongshu Sheng

Agency overview
- Formed: c. Western Han (202 BC–9 AD)
- Dissolved: 1380

Zhongshu Sheng
- Traditional Chinese: 中書省
- Simplified Chinese: 中书省
- Literal meaning: Inner (or privy) secretary's department
Transcriptions
Standard Mandarin
- Hanyu Pinyin: Zhōngshū shěng
- Wade–Giles: Chung^{1}-shu^{1} sheng^{3}

The Zhongshu Sheng (中書省), also known as the Palace Secretariat or Central Secretariat, was one of the departments of the Three Departments and Six Ministries government structure in imperial China from the Cao Wei (220–266) until the early Ming dynasty. As such, the Zhongshu Sheng was primarily a policy-formulating agency responsible for proposing and drafting all imperial decrees, but its actual function varied at different times. The department traces its origins back to the Han dynasty.

== History ==
=== Origins: Han dynasty and Cao Wei ===
The Central Secretariat originated during the reign of Emperor Wu of Han (r. 141-87 BC) to handle documents. The chief steward for writing (尚書; shangshu), aided by eunuch secretary-receptionists (中書謁者; zhongshu yezhe), forwarded documents to the inner palace. This organization was headed by a Secretariat Director (中書令; zhongshu ling) assisted by a Vice Director (中書仆射; zhongshu puye). These two posts came to assert significant political influence on the court, causing eunuchs to be forbidden from holding these posts by the end of the Western Han dynasty. This institution continued after the end of the Han dynasty into Cao Wei. Emperor Wen of Wei formally created the Central Secretariat, headed by a Secretariat Supervisor (中書監; zhongshu jian) and a Director (中書令; zhongshu ling). Although lower in rank than the Shangshu Sheng (Department of State Affairs), the personnel of the Central Secretariat worked closer to the emperor and were responsible for drafting edicts, and therefore their content. Under the Wei, the Central Secretariat was also in charge of the palace library, but this responsibility was terminated during the Jin dynasty (266–420). In the Northern and Southern dynasties, the personnel ranged from princes and high ranking family members to professional writers. The position and responsibilities of the Central Secretariat varied greatly in this period, sometimes even being put in charge of judicial and entertainment matters.

=== Sui and Tang dynasties ===
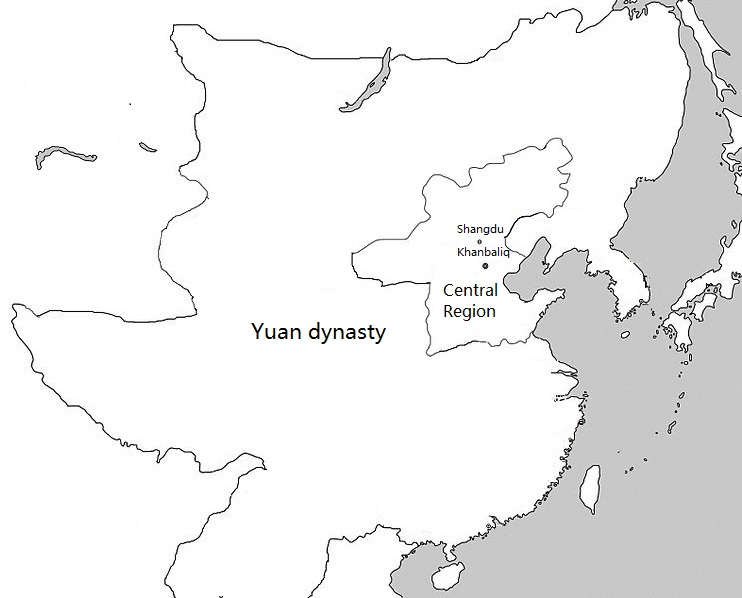
The Central Region within the Yuan dynasty directly governed by the Central Secretariat.

The Central Secretariat was known by a variety of names during the Sui dynasty and Tang dynasty. The Sui called it neishisheng (內史省)) or neishusheng (內書省)). Emperor Gaozong of Tang (r. 618-626) called it the "Western Terrace" (西臺; xitai), Wu Zetian (regent 684-690, ruler 690-704) called it the "Phoenix Tower" (鳳閣; fengge), and Emperor Xuanzong of Tang (r. 712-755) named it the "Department of the Purple Mystery" (紫微省; ziweisheng). During the Sui-Tang period, the duty of the Central Secretariat was to read incoming material to the throne, answer questions from the emperor, and to draft imperial edicts. The Sui and Tang added posts for compilation of the imperial diary and proof-reading documents. In the Sui dynasty, the Central Secretariat Director was sometimes the same person as the Grand Chancellor (宰相; zaixiang). In the Tang, the Director was also master of court assemblies, and often where Grand Chancellors started their careers. The Central Secretariat Director took part in conferences with the emperor alongside the directors of the Department of State Affairs and the Chancellery. In the latter half of the Tang dynasty, the title of Director of the Central Secretariat was given to jiedushi (military commissioners) to give them a higher status, which deprived the title of its real value. The Hanlin Academy gained prominence as its academicians (學士; xueshi) began processing and drafting documents in place of the Central Secretariat, which allowed emperors to issue edicts without prior consultation with Secretariat staff.

=== Song, Jin, Liao dynasties ===
During the early Song dynasty (960–1279), the Central Secretariat was formally demoted and its function reduced to processing less important documents like memorials, resubmitted documents, or lists of examinations. The Central Secretariat no longer had a Director and its office was merged with that of the Chancellery, called Secretariat-Chancellery (中書門下; zhongshu menxia, shortened 中書; zhongshu) or Administration Chamber (zhengshitang). Drafting documents became the function of a new Document Drafting Office (舍人院; sherenyuan). A reform during the Yuanfeng reign-period (1078-1085) restored the Central Secretariat to its former functions and the Document Drafting Office was renamed the Secretariat Rear Section (中書後省; zhongshu housheng). However the title of Director remained an honorific while real leadership of the Central Secretariat went to the Right Vice Director of the Department of State Affairs (尚書右仆射; shangshu you puye, or 右丞; youcheng), who also held the title of Court Gentleman of the Central Secretariat (中書侍郎; zhongshu shilang). Another Court Gentleman of the Central Secretariat managed the institution and participated in court consultations. The Rear Section was managed by a Secretariat Drafter (zhongshu sheren). The Left Vice Director (左仆射; zuo puye, or 左丞; zuocheng) held the titles of Court Gentleman of the Chancellery (門下侍郎; menxia shilang) and Grand Chancellor concurrently. Policy decisions were made by the Grand Chancellor before the edicts and documents were drafted and issued. In the Southern Song period (1127-1279), the Central Secretariat was merged with the Chancellery again. The Right Vice Director became Grand Chancellor of the Right while the Court Gentleman of the Central Secretariat became Vice Grand Chancellor.

The Khitan-led Liao dynasty (916–1125) had an institution similar in function to the Central Secretariat of the early Tang dynasty, called the Department of Administration (政事省; zhengshisheng). The posts of Director, Vice Director, and the drafters, were mostly held by Chinese.

The Jurchen-led Jin dynasty (1115–1234) had a Central Secretariat that functioned similarly to the Song institution, but the paperwork was done by academicians rather than professional drafters. The Right Chancellor of the Central Secretariat (尚書右丞相; shangshu you chengxiang) was subordinate to the Grand Chancellor. Emperor Wanyan Liang (r. 1149-1160) abolished the institution.

=== Yuan dynasty ===
The Mongol-led Yuan dynasty (1271–1368) made the Central Secretariat the central administrative office, responsible for all civil administration, and abolished the Department of State Affairs in 1292 (revived 1309-1311). The post of Director was held by an imperial prince or left vacant, however real work went to the right and left Grand Chancellors. Under the Grand Chancellors were four managers of governmental affairs (平章政事; pingzhang zhengshi) and a right and left aide (右丞; you cheng, 左丞; zuo cheng), who were collectively known as state counsellors (宰執; zaizhi). Below the state counsellors there were four consultants (參議中書省事; canyi zhongshusheng shi) responsible for paperwork and took part in decisions. The Central Secretariat controlled the Six Ministries and was thus functionally the heart of the government. The regions surrounding the Yuan capital Khanbaliq, including what are now Shandong, Shanxi, Hebei and Inner Mongolia provinces were known as the Central Region (腹裏; fuli) and directly subordinate to the Central Secretariat. Branch secretariats were set up throughout the provinces.

In the early Ming dynasty (1368–1644), the Hongwu Emperor Zhu Yuanzhang became suspicious of the chancellor Hu Weiyong and executed him in 1380. The Central Secretariat was also abolished and its functions delegated to the Hanlin Academy and Grand Secretariat.

== See also ==
- Mandarin (bureaucrat)
- Central Secretariat of the Chinese Communist Party
- Grand Secretariat (literally "Inner Cabinet"), the coordinating agency of the Ming dynasty after 1380
- Zhili ("Directly-Administered" Area)
- Shangshu Sheng
- Menxia Sheng
