= Nine Ministers =

Groups of imperial Chinese officials

- Chinese: 九卿
Transcriptions
Standard Mandarin
- Hanyu Pinyin: Jiǔ Qīng
- Wade–Giles: Chiu Ch'ing

The Nine Ministers, also known by their Chinese name as the Jiuqing, were nine high officials in the imperial government of the Han dynasty (206 BC–220 AD), who each headed one of the Nine Courts and were subordinates to the Three Councillors of State.

The term "Nine Ministers" could also refer to the nine high-ranking officials in the Ming dynasty: the respective functional heads of the Six Ministries, the Censorate, the Office of Transmission, and the Grand Court of Revision.

== List ==
The Nine Courts and Ministers throughout most of Chinese history were:

The Nine Courts and Ministers
Court				Minister				
English	Chinese			English		Chinese		
English	Trad.	Simp.	Pinyin	De Crespigny	Alternative(s) (Note: Alternative translations exist, for example Wang's. See Translation of Han dynasty titles for details.)	Trad.	Simp.	Pinyin
Court of Imperial Sacrifices	太常寺		Tàichángsì	Minister of Ceremonies	Minister of Imperial Sacrifices	太常		Tàicháng
Court of Imperial Entertainments	光祿寺	光祿寺	Guānglùsì	Minister of the Household	Minister of Imperial Entertainments; Supervisor of Attendants	光祿勳	光禄勋	Guānglùxūn
Court of the Imperial Clan	宗正寺		Zōngzhèngsì	Minister of the Imperial Clan	Director of the Imperial Clan	宗正		Zōngzhèng
Court of the Imperial Stud	太僕寺	太仆寺	Tàipúsì	Minister Coachman	Grand Servant	太僕	太仆	Tàipú
Court of the Imperial Treasury	太府寺		Tàifǔsì	Minister Steward	Small Treasurer	少府		Shàofǔ
Court of the Imperial Regalia	衛尉寺	卫尉寺	Wèiwèisì	Minister of the Guards	Commandant of Guards	衛尉	卫尉	Wèiwèi
Court of State Ceremonial	鴻臚寺	鸿胪寺	Hónglúsì	Minister Herald	Grand Herald	鴻臚	鸿胪	Hónglú
Court of the National Granaries	司農寺	司农寺	Sīnóngsì	Minister of Finance	Grand Minister of Agriculture	司農	司农	Sīnóng
Court of Judicature and Revision	大理寺		Dàlǐsì	Minister of Justice	Commandant of Justice	大理		Dàlǐ

=== Minister of Ceremonies ===
The Minister of Ceremonies, usually described as a chief priest in the government, was responsible for ceremonies in the imperial ancestral temples and in charge of astronomy, astrology, and the daily records of the emperor's activities. He also supervised the operation of the Imperial Academy, selecting and examining the students. If they were suitable, he was also responsible to report their eligibility for office to the emperor.

=== Minister of the Household ===
The Minister of the Household was in charge of the Gentlemen (郎; láng), civil service candidates who stood guard at the doors of palaces and halls. The Gentlemen came from a variety of backgrounds: family members and relatives of high-ranking officials; graduates of the Imperial Academy; men of good moral character recommended by local and regional officials; men of special talents, great wealth, and so on. Every year, the Minister assessed and rated these Gentlemen on four qualities (simplicity, generosity, modesty and virtue) and recommended them for office accordingly.

=== Minister of the Guards ===
The Minister of the Guards was essentially the chief of the Imperial Guards, who guarded the palaces. Unlike the Gentlemen, the Imperial Guards were men drafted from among the common people and they were required to serve for a year.

=== Minister Coachman ===
The Minister Coachman was in charge of the Emperor's chariots, carriages and horses. He was responsible for ensuring that the appropriate number and type of chariots, carriages and horses were used at ceremonies. He also supervised the government pastures and the horses raised there.

=== Minister of Justice ===
The Minister of Justice was in charge of the laws. He accepted and decided all the lawsuits that provincial governors failed to dispose of. The cases which he could not decide were reported to the Emperor, along with the relevant details and appropriate articles of the law code that might apply.

=== Minister Herald ===
The Minister Herald performed the role of a master of ceremonies at religious rituals (e.g. worship at the imperial ancestral temple) and when the Emperor received guests. He was also in charge of affairs related to the marquises, or officials rewarded with enfeoffment for meritorious service.

=== Minister of the Imperial Clan ===
The Minister of the Imperial Clan was in charge of members of the imperial clan, i.e., the Emperor's family and relatives. He kept a record of all the Emperor's relatives and received the registers of the Emperor's relatives prepared and submitted by provincial officials.

=== Minister of Finance ===
The Minister of Finance or Agriculture was in charge of the collection of revenue for the state treasury and the disbursement of expenditures from the state treasury. Sources of revenue for the state treasury included poll tax, land tax, commutation of labour service into cash payment, profits from the state monopoly over iron and salt, income from public land, and profit from the state-sanctioned sale of alcoholic drinks. The expenditures included salaries of officials, and supplies for the army. The Minister of Finance also administered the state monopoly over the production and sale of iron and salt, and the sale of alcoholic drinks. He also had direct control over the granaries in the imperial capital and the provinces.

=== Minister Steward ===
The Minister Steward managed the palace treasury, i.e., the private finances of the imperial clan. Sources of revenue for the palace treasury included taxes on mountains, seas and lakes, which were considered the Emperor's property. The Minister Steward was also in charge of disbursing the incomes of members of the imperial clan.

== Rank ==
In the Han dynasty, civil service officials were classified in 20 grades (reduced to 16 after 32 BC) expressed by the official's annual salary in terms of dan (石) or Chinese bushels, extending from the 10,000 bushels at the top to the 100 bushels at the bottom. Under this scheme, each of the nine ministers drew a salary of the full 2,000 bushels.

During the Ming dynasty, the officialdom was classified in nine grades, each grade subdivided into two degrees, extending from upper first grade at the top to lower ninth grade at the bottom. Under this system, the Ministers of the Six Ministries all held the rank of upper third grade, and rose to upper second grade after the abolishment of the position of Imperial Chancellor in 1380. The Censor-in-Chief, head of the Censorate, had a rank of lower first grade before 1380 and upper second grade after. The functional heads of the Grand Court of Revision and the Office of Transmission both held a rank of upper third grade.

== See also ==
- Nine Courts
- Political systems of Imperial China
- Three Lords and Nine Ministers
- Government of the Han dynasty
- Translation of Han dynasty titles
