= Three Lords and Nine Ministers =

Administrative system in ancient China

The Three Lords and Nine Ministers system (Chinese: 三公九卿) was a central administrative system adopted in ancient China that was officially instituted in the Qin dynasty (221 BC – 206 BC) and was replaced by the Three Departments and Six Ministries (Chinese: 三省六部) system since the Sui dynasty (AD 589–618).

== Divisions ==
=== Three Lords ===
Three Lords referred to three highest rank officials in the imperial government, namely:

- Grand Chancellor (丞相)
- Imperial Secretary (御史大夫)
- Grand Commandant (太尉)

=== Nine Ministers ===
Nine Ministers comprised all the ministers of importance in the central government. They were:

- Minister of Ceremonies (太常, formally known as 奉常)
- Supervisor of Attendants (光祿勛, formally known as 郎中令)
- Commandant of Guards (衛尉)
- Minister of Coachmen (太僕)
- Commandant of Justice (廷尉)
- Grand Herald (大鴻臚, formally known as 典客 or 大行令)
- Director of the Imperial Clan (宗正)
- Grand Minister of Agriculture (大司農, formally known as 治粟內史)
- Small Treasurer (少府)

== See also ==
- Five Directorates
- Government of the Han dynasty
- Nine Courts
- Political systems of Imperial China
