= Taipusi =

Taipusi may refer to:

- Taibus Banner, also known as Taipusi, a banner in Xilin Gol, Inner Mongolia, China
- Court of the Imperial Stud, a historical central government agency
