= Chinese miners in Vietnam =

In the eighteenth and nineteenth century, a number of Chinese migrant miners worked in the frontiers of northern Vietnam.

== Brief introduction ==
During the 18th and 19th century, a large number of Chinese labors went across the borderline in southwest provinces of China, entered into northern Vietnam to work in mines, and became the so-called migrant Chinese miners. This group of people promoted trans-border communication and changed the landscape of the Sino-Vietnam border area. They contributed to the economic development in the border area and northern Vietnam; in addition, they also influenced the border policy of both sides. The impacts of Chinese miners in the frontier have to be seen from both positive and negative aspects. On one hand, cross-border population movement promoted transnational communication, and Chinese miners motivated the development of mining industry in northern Vietnam, which was an important source of financial revenue for Vietnamese government in the 18th century. On the other hand, because either China or Vietnam did not have the direct control of these migrant Chinese miners, this group of people threatened the stability of the border area. Rebellions involved Chinese miners profoundly affected the frontier society and the border policies of both sides. Qing government even closed the border in the second half of the 18th century. The trend of Chinese migrant miners reached its peak in the mid to late 18th century. After two large-scale rebellions in the 1770s and 1830s, the mining industry in northern Vietnam went down. Chinese miners in northern Vietnam have also faded out of our vision. However, in the 18th and 19th centuries, migrant Chinese miners played a significant role in the economic and social development of northern Vietnam.

== Background ==
Metal product trades between China and Southeast Asia had existed for several hundred years before the 18th century. Siam, Burma, Malaya, and Dai Viet had built business contacts with China since the 10th century. Until the 15th and 16th century when the age of discovery came, China was the largest trading partner of metal products of Southeast Asian countries because of the advanced mining and smelting technology. Cheaper metal products from China were popular in the Southeast Asian market. Meanwhile, Southeast Asia's rich mineral resources also met China's demand for silver, copper, tin and other metals. Vietnam, until the 10th century, if not early, had established stable trade relations with China. At least four major trade routes connect Yunnan Province in China and Tonkin in Vietnam, and one of the key commodities of such cross-border trade was metal. The border province Yunnan was one of the main mineral producing areas in China. In the mid-fourteenth century, Yunnan was producing over half of the gold and silver circulating in the Chinese economy. Considering that the development of Yunnan's mining industry began early and mature, there were a large number of skilled miners and laborers in this border province. This group of people became migrant workers. When the time came to the 18th century, the prosperity of Qing dynasty boosted the economic development in Yunnan, and the rapidly growing population in the southwest of China promoted cross-border population movement. On Vietnam side, after the East India trading companies withdrew from Vietnam in the early 18th century, Le-Trinh regime in northern Vietnam was eager to find new sources of income to alleviate the shortage of funds caused by the termination of trade with West. Mining thus became a significant supplement to the state. Despite realizing that the uncontrolled increase of Chinese miners might bring potential instability, Trinh regime still allowed and even encouraged Chinese miners to participate in Vietnamese mining industry. Therefore, hundreds of Chinese miners crossed the border and chose to become workers in Vietnam territory, which fueled a trend of trans-border miner movement.

== Development of mining industry in the 18th century ==
=== Development before 1775 ===
The mountainous area in northern Vietnam was rich in minerals. In the late 17th century, thanks to the Chinese trans-border commercial activities, the development of the mining industry in the northern frontier of Vietnam reached a record high level. Meanwhile, in China, private mining was prohibited by the Qing government until 1749. As a result, Chinese businessmen and labors began to enter the mining industry abroad in the early era of Qing dynasty. Chinese miners emerged in places like Myanmar and Laos as well; however, because of the closer relationship and stable border policy between Vietnam and China, Vietnam was the most attractive destination of more Chinese miners. There are no detailed records of official historical materials showing the number of Chinese miners in Vietnam. Scholars from China nowadays believe that around 25,000 and 35,000 Chinese miners, by the 1770s, were working in Vietnam. They were from not only the frontier provinces like Yunnan and Guangxi but also Fujian and Guangdong provinces in the east. Some mines in northern Vietnam recruited hundreds of Chinese miners and even thousands of. These Chinese miners brought huge development to the mining industry in Vietnam. In the second half of the eighteenth century, the average annual output of the two largest mines in northern Vietnam reached 220 to 280 tons, and this frontier region became one of the largest copper producing complexes in Asia at that time.

=== Policy of the Vietnamese government ===
For these miners from China, the Vietnamese government formulated some corresponding management measures. It was warlord era in the 18th century in Vietnam. Le-Trinh regime controlled the northern part of Vietnam while Nguyen regime occupied the south. Both of Le-Trinh and Nguyen needed a large number of military squads. Nguyen regime in the south, to increase its fiscal revenue, encouraged maritime trade. Many Chinese merchant ships traveled extensively to southern Vietnam for commerce. In the north, Trinh Lord encouraged Sino-Vietnamese border trade, and vigorously developed the mining industry in the northern mountainous areas. Trinh Lord allowed Chinese miners to cross the border to Vietnam territory for mining activities. As long as they receive a license issued by Trinh Lord and paid the tax, Chinese miners could work with the Vietnamese, even if the continuous increasing of trans-border population led many conflicts. In the 1760s, Le-Trinh regime adopted new policies to stimulate the development of the mining industry. It allowed local authorities and officials using their private capital to run one or two mines. The mine owners could select labors from both local and abroad. After the mine had declared and paid taxes for five years, the officials who succeeded in operating mines could remain control of the mines forever. This privatization policy promoted the expansion of the mining industry. Before the end of the 18th century, there were more than one hundred active mines in northern Vietnam frontier area. By the beginning of the 19th century, 108 of the 134 mines in Vietnam were located in the northern highland provinces of Thai Nguyen, Tuyen Quang, Cao Bang, Lang Son, Tong Hoa, and Son Tay. They produced gold (31), silver (13), copper (7), iron (25), zinc (5), lead (4), tin (1), pig iron (4), saltpeter (15), sulfur (2), and cinnabar (1).

=== Passport system of the Qing government ===
Long-term stable and prosperous trans-border communication provided the proper condition for the movement of miners. Chinese migrants greatly stimulated trans-border trade and promoted the local development. New towns were founded by the migrants and more Chinese began to manage shops and restaurants nearby mine sites. Because the miners were generally male, their family (mainly women and children) took part in the trans-border trade, which stimulated goods circulation. Some commodities became cheaper in the border area than in Red River Delta, and entertainment could be found easily. While stimulating Vietnam's economic development and prosperity in the frontier, Chinese miners also brought silver bracelets back to China. Silverware was popular in Yunnan and Guangxi provinces in the 18th century. With the increasing trans-border activities, more and more small frictions and conflicts occurred in the border area. In response to the chaotic border management situation, Maertai, Viceroy of Guangdong-Guangxi provinces, proposed new border management regulations. Qing government redefined the border gateways (关口) and established the Yaopai (腰牌) and Yinpiao (印票) system, which was like the modern passport system, to systematically manage cross-border merchants. People who frequently crossed the border needed to apply Yaopai and Yinpiao (passport) from the government as identity documents for crossing border; the government provided convenience and simple border-crossing procedures for those who had such documents. This system allowed the authorities to better manage cross-border personnel on the one hand and reduced the formalities required for cross-border traders, on the other hand, which made cross-border communication more convenient. Under the passport system, more miners flowed into Vietnam in the mid-18th century.

== Tong Tinh Mines incidents and mining situation in the late 18th century ==
Border issue was particularly sensitive in Qing-Le relationship. There were many rebellions in the Sino-Vietnamese border area in the 18th century. Tong Tinh mines incident was the largest one of them and had a great influence on the mining industry in northern Vietnam and national relationship. Tong Tinh mines (送星厂) were mines in Thai Nguyen province in Vietnam. By the mid-18th century, many miners and their families gathered at the Tong Tinh mining site and made it a larger settlement. Restaurants, teahouses, medicine shops, and other facilities appeared here, making Tong Tinh a prosperous town in the border frontier. Tong Tinh mines produced a variety of minerals, while the main source was silver. Vietnamese and Chinese miners had worked together in harmony until 1765, when two Chinese, Zhang Renfu and Zhang Nante, separated Chinese miners into different groups and contested to gain the control of Tong Tinh mines. Violent clashes erupted in 1765. Ngo Thi Si, governor of Thai Nguyen, did not respond to the conflict but appealed Qing government to come forward to resolve the problem because of the involvement of Chinese subjects. However, Qing officials did not know about the conflict and refused to intervene. Therefore, Ngo Thi Si led a mediation team to Tong Tinh mines to solve the problem but hurried back to the capital because of the death of Trinh Lord. Before leaving, Ngo reached a new tax-related agreement with Chinese miners and temporarily calmed the violent rebellion. A more significant and influential disruption of Chinese miners happened in 1775, which was called the second Tong Tinh Mines Incident. In 1775, the Chinese miners of the silver factory split again into two groups, led by Zhang Deyu and Li Qiaoguang. Two groups of people came into conflict and interrupted the tax payment to the government of Thai Nguyen Province. Thai Nguyen government led the troops to quell the rebellion of the Tong Tinh mines successfully, and then took the leaders of rebellion to Thang Long, the capital of Le dynasty. Qing government regarded it as a serious diplomatic event because, for this time, the conflict was between Chinese miners and Vietnamese troops. Under the direction of the Qianlong Emperor, Guangdong-Guangxi govern-general Li Shiyao closed the Youcun (由村) gateway, which was opened in 1744, and suspended the issuing of trans-border pass, which symbolized the abolishment of passport system established in 1744. Local officials of Qing dynasty strictly restricted the flow of people crossing the border, and trans-border trade was forbidden. The second Tong Tinh incident led to a trend of miners returning to China. According to the records of Qing She Lu, about 2,000 to 3,000 miners returned in 1775. The local government regarded returned miners as unstable factors in the border area, so that 63 people who involved in Tong Tinh incident were sent to Yili, Xinjiang, as punishment. 903 lesser offenders were sent to Ürümqi to farm, and others returned to Jiangsu, Anhui, and other provinces according to their home location. The return of Chinese miners was unexpected by the Vietnamese government. Even during the conflict, the Vietnamese government did not consider to expel a large number of Chinese miners. To respond to the returning trend, Le-Trinh government wrote to Qing officials for hoping Qing authorities to allow miners going back to Vietnam instead of sending them to their hometowns. Qing rejected such request and asked the Vietnamese government to return any illicit border crossers. After Tong Tinh incident, in the late 1770s and 1780s, Trinh Lord continued to seek financial revenue in the border area. In the 1770s, another insurgency occurred in the Dulong mine in Lang Song province. Since there was no record of Chinese workers involved, Dulong incident didn't attract as much attention from historians as what Tong Tinh incident did. However, ongoing conflicts showed that Le-Trinh government lacked effective management of the mining industry in the border area. Tay Son force defeated Le-Trinh army and occupied Thang Long in 1786. In 1788, the Qing government sent troops to Vietnam, trying to help Le to restore power but failed. Since then, the Qing government recognized the status of Tay Son regime and began to establish normal relations with it. The fall of Le-Trinh regime and the establishment of Tay Son changed Vietnamese border policy and brought a new period of Sino-Vietnamese relation. In 1792, the Qing government reopened the border and restored the passport system of 1744. Border trade and population movements picked up, and the mining industry in northern Vietnam also ushered in prosperity again. Even though experiencing the returning trend of Chinese miners, many silver and gold mines in Thai Nguyen, Tuyen Quang, and other provinces were still under the control of Chinese miners. Since living in Vietnam for many years, many Chinese miners and merchants formed relations with local people through trade and marriage. Some Chinese people, even after they returned, still considered Vietnam as their homeland.

== Changes in the 19th century ==
Tong Tinh mine incidents in the 1770s and the civil war in 1780s changed the mining industry in northern Vietnam. After Nguyen Dynasty, the last dynasty in Vietnam history replaced Tay Son regime in 1802, Gia Long, the first emperor of Nguyen Dynasty, realized the importance of mining industry to Vietnamese economy and hoped to revitalize the mining industry. Unlike Le's encouraging privatization policy, Nguyen's approach was to strengthen government control and to prohibit private trade of metals. However, the consequence of tightened control was the loss of mining practitioners. In response to the lack of miners, Nguyen government reduced the taxes to stimulate the producing. In 1816, the court waived taxes for three mines: Nam Hoac iron mine in Thai Nguyen, Sư Khong saltpeter mine in Son Tay, and the Mai Sao saltpeter mine in Lang Son. In 1821, Emperor Minh Menh, the successor of Gia Long, again ordered taxes to be waived for eight mines in Bac Thanh. In 1823, the court continued to waive taxes for mines producing gold, zinc, copper, and saltpeter due to the lack of mine owners and laborers. The tax reduction helped to maintain most of the old mines and to operate some new mines in the first three decades of the nineteenth century. However, prosperity brought by government incentives could not last long. The situation changed in 1831. According to Nguyen's policy, the mines, based on their scales, had to sell a certain amount of gold (or equivalent silver) to the government at a low price every year. While the market price was around 100 strings for 24-karat gold and 80 strings for 20-karat gold, the price that the government bought was 50 strings. Unreasonable expropriation system and other tax reforms made the dissatisfaction phenomena spread in the northern mining area, and consequently, eighteen gold mines halted operation by the 1830s. In 1833, a team of about 8,000 people began to attack the capital of Thai Nguyen Province. The main group of attackers was the Chinese miners from neighboring mines, which led by Nong Van Van. In response to the uprising, Nguyen government announced the closure of all mines in the northern region. In the early days, the government did not successfully defend the rebel attacks. In August, the Nong Van Van's troop occupied the citadel of Cao Bang Province. In mid-October and early-November, a large rebel force pressed hard on the provincial citadel of Thái Nguyên. Chinese miners from Linh Nham mine participated in the battle in Thai Nguyen. At the end of 1833, the rebel was basically suppressed. Throughout 1834 and 1835, Nông Văn Vân, fled to the home of his second wife in Zhen'an prefecture, was pursued by Nguyễn troops. Thousands of Chinese miners participated in this rebellion, and afterward, they said that it was Nong Van Van and his subordinate forced them to involve. During and after Nong Van Van's uprising, miners and residents, both Chinese and Vietnamese, kept crossing the border into China to escape from the war. Qing government was very cautious about this rebellion. Because both sides of the conflict are Vietnamese, the Qing government refused to be involved in the conflict, even though the Qing army had gathered in the border area to prevent conflicts from spreading into Chinese territory. Qing refused to intervene militarily into areas under Nguyễn control that Chinese troops. At the same time, the Qing court prevented Nguyễn troops from coming into Chinese territory, even for the sole purpose of pursuing rebel forces.

== After the 1830s ==
The death of Nong Van Van brought to a close the widespread uprising launched under his leadership and other tribal chieftains in the borderland. Nominally, the failure of this uprising was a victory for the Nguyen court of controlling the mining in the northern uplands. In reality, the court's victory was short-lived. Through the rest of the 1830s, the total number of operative mines remained around 30 to 40. In 1840, out of twenty-seven gold mine sites in northern Vietnam, only nine were still in operation; the remaining eighteen sites had been sealed shut. Out of ten silver mine sites; only seven were still active, with three having been abandoned. Emperor Minh Menh continued to stimulate mining activities through direct management by the state. In his proposal, the state provided the capital, sent officials to the mines and hired the labors. However, these measures did not receive the expected results. After two attempts, the total amount of silver produced by the state-operated mines was only 8 taels, 7 coppers at the Tong Tinh mine and 10 taels, 5 coppers at the Nhan Son mine; the state had thus incurred a loss of over 100 strings in a short time. With such wretched results, Emperor Minh Menh ordered work to be stopped at both mines and returned them to receivership by private individuals again. The government later released restrictions on the operation of mines by individuals and local officials like mid-1700s. Minh Menh was forced to resume the old management model of receivership for tax collection. However, none of them played a role. The prosperity of the mining industry in northern Vietnam had passed. After half a century of war and chaotic management, the mining industry has been destined to decline.
