= Jiu Si =

Jiu Si may refer to:

- "Nine Longings", a major section of the ancient Chinese poetry collection Chu Ci
- Nine Courts, top service agencies of the central government during imperial China

== See also ==
- Jiusi, Hubei (旧司), a town in Laifeng County, Hubei, China
