= Translation of Han dynasty titles =

Translation of Han dynasty government titles into English

The translation of Han dynasty government titles into English varies within the academic community. This page is a reference to compare renderings of Chinese official titles by different sinologists.

== History ==
The first specialist reference for the English renderings of Chinese official titles was written in 1878 by a British legate to the Chinese government in Beijing, William Frederick Mayers. The most common terms used today in translation of official titles date back to Homer H. Dubs's translation of the Book of Han and Book of the Later Han from 1938 to 1955.

Dubs's translation lacked a published glossary of titles, but a list of titles used by Dubs was compiled by Rafe de Crespigny and published in 1967. In the interim, Wang Yuquan (王毓銓) published An Outline of the Central Government of the Former Han Dynasty in 1949. The next major systematising work on Han dynasty government was The Bureaucracy of Han Times written by Hans Bielenstein in 1980, drawing upon Dubs's and de Crespigny's work as its major source of translation for titles.

In 1985, Charles Hucker completed his Dictionary of Official Titles of Imperial China, a collection of nearly 8,300 titles and government offices and associated translations for every dynasty from the Zhou to the Qing, the most complete specialist literature of its type. During the 1980s and 1990s another list of proposed translation for Han dynasty titles was circulating in the University of Washington, where Jack Dull headed the Han Dynasty Project. Long after Dull's death, this list was made available as part of his collection of unpublished papers, available online from University of Oregon. Dull's list of Official Titles of the Han Dynasty also mainly follows Dubs.

Two comprehensive biographical dictionaries have also added to these reference aids: Michael Loewe's 2000 Biographical Dictionary of Qin, Former Han, and Xin Periods, and Rafe de Crespigny's 2007 Biographical Dictionary of Later Han to the Three Kingdoms, both published by Brill and intended to complement each other. De Crespigny's translation of titles mainly follow Dubs with some alterations, whereas Loewe's tend to be his own original renderings.

In 2007 Rafe de Crespigny published online a collection of his papers, among them An Outline of the Military Organisation of the Later Han Empire and An Outline of the Civil Administration of the Later Han Empire. Each of these include an appendix listing a number of titles along with the translation de Crespigny has adopted, which he calls "slightly modified, varying from the system established by H.H. Dubs...".

== Schema for Han dynasty titles ==
=== The Dubs school ===
The Dubs school of title translation has the longest pedigree of any schema for title translation and has broad acceptance in the scholarly community, but it was not built on any unifying principles and changed erratically during Dubs's lifetime. It is now mainly represented by the works of Bielenstein, de Crespigny, and Dull, all of whom made their own minor alterations while trying to remain mostly in the Dubs framework.

Wang Yuquan's 1949 article, although based entirely on primary source materials, seems to draw inspiration for translation of titles from Dubs in places, and can be considered to be completely superseded by later works. It was a source for Bielenstein, who called it "out of date". Bielenstein remains the academic standard which all others attempt to improve but compare themselves against for context. Dull's work, unpublished until it was released freely on the web in 2010, has been ignored by academia. De Crespigny has gone further outside the Dubs mold than the other authors.

In a 1971 review of de Crespigny's 1969 translation of part of the Zizhi Tongjian, Han dynasty specialist Anthony Hulsewé impugned the renderings of Chinese official titles, which then much more closely followed Dubs, as "barbarized" and "abhorrent".

=== The Hucker system ===
Hucker's system has, in the main, not been adopted by the scholarly community. Its strengths are that it was created with a goal of systematisation and universality, and built upon sound principles of translation: that the rendering should ideally convey both the sense of the responsibilities of the office and the literal Chinese meaning, that it should avoid too-familiar Western analogues likely to create false impressions, and that it should not rely on bizarre-sounding neologisms. Hucker drew from a great deal of references during his research, including the work of Bielenstein, and received input from a large number of Chinese scholars, including de Crespigny and Dull.

In An Outline of the Civil Administration of the Later Han Empire, Rafe de Crespigny rejects outright Hucker's system, claiming he found Hucker's renderings to be unreliable and unacceptable for the Han period.

=== Loewe ===
The titles adopted by Loewe in his Biographical Dictionary largely follow the translations as they appeared in The Cambridge History of China, volume 1 (1987), which Loewe helped to edit. He shies away from more literal translations, opting instead for renderings which "indicate an official's responsibilities, or his place in the organs of government, where possible in immediately meaningful terms; and in so far as imperial offices were organised in a hierarchical basis, it has been thought advisable to choose terms which convey an official's degree of seniority." Loewe appends a table comparing the renderings he adopts to those used by "Dubs, Bielenstein, and de Crespigny", acknowledging their grouping as a single school and that school's sinological primacy.

== Difficulties ==
Several difficulties exist in providing a unified one-to-one translation for Han dynasty titles, these may range from each scholar's personal preferences to more profound issues.

One main point of contention is whether the translation should follow the literal meaning of the title or to describe the roles of that title's holder. As the Chinese bureaucracy developed, the responsibilities of an office changed and the names of positions changed, not necessarily at the same time. An office from the Zhou dynasty might share the same title as an office from the Qing dynasty, but with completely different powers, scope, and responsibilities.

Not every scholar covers every era. While Hucker's system is meant to detail government offices since the Zhou dynasty, the Dubs School focuses on the Han dynasty, and to a lesser extent the Qin dynasty and Three Kingdoms period. De Crespigny is an expert on the Eastern Han dynasty and Three Kingdoms; Loewe is an expert on the Western Han and Xin dynasties. A valid translation for one dynasty may not be valid for another.

== Comparisons ==
Here is a table of comparisons between Han dynasty Chinese official titles and five sources of renderings, ordered by pinyin.

Pinyin	Chinese	Bielenstein	Dull	de Crespigny	Hucker	Loewe
Biejia	別駕	Aide-de-camp Attendant		Attendant Officer	Mounted Escort	
Boshi	博士	Erudit	Erudite	Academician	Erudite	Academician
Cheng	丞	Assistant	Assistant	Assistant	Aide	
Chengxiang	丞相	Chancellor	Imperial Chancellor	Imperial Chancellor	Counselor-in-Chief	Chancellor
Chengmen Xiaowei	城門校尉	Colonel of the City Gates	Colonel of the City Gates	Colonel of the City Gates	Commandant of the Capital Gates	Colonel of the City Gates
Cishi	刺史	Inspector	Inspector	Inspector	Regional Inspector	Regional Inspector
Congshi	從事	Attendant Clerk	Attendant Official	Assistant Officer	Retainer	
Dafu	大夫	Grandee	Grandee	Counsellor	Grand Master	Counsellor
Da Honglu	大鴻臚	Grand Herald	Grand Herald	Minister Herald	Chamberlain for Dependencies	Superintendent of State Visits
Da Jiangjun	大將軍	General-in-chief	Grand General	General-in-Chief	General-in-Chief	General-in-Chief
Da Li	大理	Grand Judge	Grand Judge	title unused after Xin	Chamberlain for Law Enforcement	Superintendent of Trials
Da Sima	大司馬	Commander-in-chief	Grand Minister of War	Grand Marshal	Commander-in-Chief	Marshal of State
Da Sinong	大司農	Grand Minister of Agriculture	Grand Minister of Agriculture	Minister of Finance	Chamberlain for the National Treasury	Superintendent of Agriculture
Da Xingling	大行令	Prefect Grand Usher	Prefect of the Grand March; Grand Usher	title unused after Emperor Wu	Director of Messengers	Superintendent of State Visits
Dian Ke	典客	Director of Guests	Director of Guests	title unused after Emperor Jing	Chamberlain for Dependencies	Superintendent of State Visits
Dian Shuguo	典屬國	Director of Dependent States	Director of Dependent States	title unused after Emperor Cheng	Supervisor of Dependent Countries	Director of the Dependent States
Duwei	都尉	Chief Commandant	Chief Commandant	Commandant	Commandant; Defender (in the provinces)	
Duyou	督郵	Investigator	Investigator of Transgressions	Investigator	Local Inspector	Investigator
Fengchang	奉常	Upholder of Ceremonies	Minister of Imperial Ancestral Ceremonies	title unused after Emperor Wu	Chamberlain for Ceremonials	Superintendent of Ceremonial
Fengju Duwei	奉車都尉	Chief Commandant of Imperial Equipages	Chief Commandant Custodian of the Imperial Equipages	Commandant of the Equipage	Commandant-in-Chief of Chariots	Commandant, Imperial Carriages
Fujie Ling	符節令	Prefect of Insignia and Credentials	Prefect of Tallies and Credentials	Prefect of Insignia and Credentials	Manager of Credentials	Director, Insignia and Credentials
Gongcao [Shi]	功曹[史]	Bureau of Merit	Merit Evaluator	Officer of Merit	Labor Section Serviceman	Officer of the Bureau of Merit
Gongju [Sima] Ling	公車[司馬]令	Prefect of the Majors in Charge of Official Carriages	Prefect of Official Carriage's at the Major's Gate	Prefect of the Majors for Official Carriages	Director of Gate Traffic Control	Director of Official Carriages
Guanglu Dafu	光祿大夫	Imperial Household Grandee	Imperial Court Grandee	Household Counsellor	Grand Master for Splendid Happiness	Counsellor of the Palace
Guangluxun	光祿勳	Superintendent of the Imperial Household	Superintendent of the Imperial Court	Minister of the Household	Chamberlain for Attendants	Superintendent of the Palace
Huben	虎賁	Rapid as Tigers imperial guard	Rapid as Tigers imperial guard	Rapid as Tigers imperial guard	Brave as Tigers palace guard	
Huangmen Shilang	黃門侍郎	Gentleman-in-Attendance of the Yellow Gates	Attendant Gentleman at the Yellow Gate	Gentleman at the Yellow Gates	Gentleman Attendant at the Palace Gate	Gentleman in Attendance at the Yellow Gates
Ji Duwei	騎都尉	Chief Commandant of Cavalry	Commandant of Cavalry	Commandant of Cavalry	Commandant of Cavalry	Commandant, Cavalry
Jijiu	祭酒	Libationer	Libationer	Libationer	Libationer; Chancellor of the National University	Libationer
Jianyi Dafu	諫議大夫	Grandee Remonstrant and Consultant	Grandee Remonstrant and Consultant	Counsellor Remonstrant	Grand Master of Remonstrance	Advisory Counsellor
Jiangzuo Dajiang	將作大匠	Court Architect	Grand Court Architect	Court Architect	Chamberlain for the Palace Buildings	Court Architect
Jiu Qing	九卿	Nine Ministers	Nine Ministers	Nine Ministers	Nine Chamberlains	Nine Ministers of State
Ling	令	Prefect	Prefect	County magistrate	Director	Magistrate
Mu	牧	Shepherd	Shepherd	Governor	Regional Governor	Regional Commissioner
Puye	僕射	Supervisor	Supervisor	Deputy Director	Supervisor; Chief Administrator	Supervisor
San Gong	三公	Three Excellencies	Three Ducal Ministers	Three Excellencies	Three Dukes	
Shangshu	尚書	Master of Writing	Minister of Writing	Imperial Secretariat	Chief Steward for Writing (before Emperor Wu); Imperial Secretary (after Emperor Wu)	Secretariat
Shaofu	少府	Privy Treasurer	Privy Treasurer	Minister of the Privy Treasury; Minister Steward	Chamberlain of the Palace Revenues	Superintendent of the Lesser Treasury
Shi Yushi	侍御史	Attending Secretary	Attendant Imperial Secretary	Imperial Clerk	Attendant Censor	Secretary in Attendance on the Imperial Counsellor
Shizhong	侍中	Palace Attendant	Palace Attendant	Palace Attendant	Palace Attendant	Palace Attendant
Shuiheng Duwei	水衡都尉	Chief Commandant of Waters and Parks	Chief Commandant of Water and Parks	title unused after Xin	Commandant of the Imperial Gardens	Superintendent of Waterways and Parks
Sikong	司空	Minister of Works	Minister of Works	Excellency of Works	Minister of Works	Imperial Counsellor
Sili Xiaowei	司隸校尉	Colonel Director of the Retainers	Colonel-Director of the Retainers	Director of Retainers	Metropolitan Commandant	Colonel, Internal Security
Sima	司馬	Major	Major	Major	Commander	Major
Situ	司徒	Minister over the Masses	Minister of the Masses	Excellency over the Masses	Minister of Education	Chancellor
Taichang	太常	Grand Master of Ceremonies	Grand Minister of Ceremonies	Minister of Ceremonies	Chamberlain of Ceremonials	Superintendent of Ceremonial
Taifu	太傅	Grand Tutor	Grand Tutor	Grand Tutor	Grand Mentor	Senior Tutor
Taiguan [Ling]	太官[令]	Prefect Grand Provisioner	Grand Provisioner	Court Provisioner	Provisioner	
Taipu	太僕	Grand Coachman	Grand Keeper of Equipages	Minister Coachman	Chamberlain for the Imperial Stud	Superintendent of Transport
Taishi Ling	太史令	Prefect Grand Astrologer	Prefect of the Grand Clerks	Court Astronomer	Grand Astrologer	Director, Astronomy
Taishou	太守	Grand Administrator	Grand Administrator	Administrator	Governor; Grand Protector	Governor
Taiwei	太尉	Grand Commandant	Grand Commandant	Grand Commandant	Defender-in-Chief	Supreme Commander
Taixue	太學	Academy	Imperial University; Grand College	Imperial University	National University	
Taiyi Ling	太醫令	Prefect Grand Physician	Prefect of the Grand Physicians	Court Physician	Imperial Physician	Director of the Physicians-in-Chief
Taizhong Dafu	太中大夫	Grand Palace Grandee	Grand Palace Grandee	Palace Counsellor	Superior Grand Master of the Palace	Grand Counsellor of the Palace
Taizi Shaofu	太子少傅	Junior Tutor of the Heir-apparent	Junior Tutor of the Heir Apparent; Lesser Tutor of the Heir Apparent		Junior Mentor of the Heir Apparent	Junior Tutor to the Heir Apparent
Taizi Taifu	太子太傅	Grand Tutor of the Heir-apparent	Grand Tutor of the Heir Apparent	Grand Tutor of the Heir Apparent	Grand Mentor of the Heir Apparent	Senior Tutor to the Heir Apparent
Tingwei	廷尉	Commandant of Justice	Commandant of Justice	Minister of Justice	Chamberlain for Law Enforcement	Superintendent of Trials
Weishi Ling	衛士令	Prefect of the Guards	Prefect of the Guards	Prefect of the Guards	Director of the Guardsmen	
Weiwei	衛尉	Commandant of the Guards	Commanant of the Guards	Minister of the Guards	Chamberlain for the Palace Garrison	Superintendent of the Guards
Wu guan Zhonglang Jiang	五官中郎將	General of the Gentlemen-of-the-Household for All Purposes	General of the Palace Gentlemen of the Five Offices	General of the Household for All Purposes	Leader of the Court Gentlemen for Miscellaneous Uses	Leader of the Gentlemen of the Palace, all purposes
Xianling	縣令	Prefect	Prefect	Prefect	District Magistrate	County Magistrate
Xianzhang	縣長	Chief	Chief	County Magistrate	District Magistrate	County Magistrate
Xiangguo	相國	Chancellor of State	Chancellor of State	Chancellor of State	Counselor-in-Chief	Chancellor of State
Xiaowei	校尉	Colonel	Colonel	Colonel	Commandant	Colonel
Yezhe	謁者	Internuncio	Internuncio	Internuncio	Receptionist	Imperial Messenger
Yilang	議郎	Gentleman Consultant	Gentleman-Consultant	Consultant	Court Gentleman for Consultation	Gentleman Consultant
Yin	尹	Governor	Governor	Intendant	Governor	Governor
You Zhonglang Jiang	右中郎將	General of the Gentlemen-of-the-Household of the Right	General of the Palace Gentlemen of the Right	General of the Household of the Right	Leader of Court Gentlemen of the Right	Leader of the Gentlemen of the Palace of the Right
Yulin	羽林	Feathered Forest imperial guards	The Forest of Feathers guards	Feathered Forest imperial guard	Palace Guard	Elite Yulin Corps
Yushi Dafu	御史大夫	Grandee Secretary	Grandee Secretary	Imperial Counsellor	Censor-in-Chief	Imperial Counsellor
Yushi Zhongcheng	御史中丞	Palace Assistant Secretary	Palace Assistant Imperial Secretary	Palace Assistant Imperial Clerk	Palace Aide to the Censor-in-Chief	Assistant to the Imperial Counsellor
Zhangshi	長史	Chief Clerk	Chief Clerk	Chief Clerk	Aide	Chief clerk
Zheng	正	Director	Director	Director	Director; Supervisor; Head	
Zhijinwu	執金吾	Bearer of the Gilded Mace	Chief of Police	Bearer of the Mace	Chamberlain for the Imperial Insignia	Superintendent of the Capital
Zhi su Neishi	治粟內史	Clerk of the Capital for Grain	Clerk of the Capital for Supplies; Secretary of the Interior	title unused after Emperor Wu	Chamberlain for the National Treasury	Superintendent of Agriculture
Zhonglang Jiang	中郎將	General of the Gentlemen-of-the-Household	General of the Palace Gentlemen	General of the Household	Leader of Court Gentlemen	Leader of the Gentlemen of the Palace
Zhongsan Dafu	中散大夫	Palace Attendant Grandee	Palace Grandee Without Specified Appointment	Attendant Counsellor	Grand Master of Palace Leisure	
Zhongshu	中書	Palace Writer	Palace Writer		Palace Secretary	Palace Writer
Zhongshu Guan	中書官		Eunuch Palace Writer			
Zhongwei	中尉	Commandant of the Capital	Commandant of the Capital	Commandant of the Capital	Chamberlain for the Imperial Insignia	Superindendant of the Capital
Zhubu	主簿	Master of Records	Master of Documents	Registrar	Recorder	Registrar
Zongzheng	宗正	Director of the Imperial Clan	Superintendent of the Imperial Clan	Minister of the Imperial Clan	Chamberlain for the Imperial Clan	Superintendent of the Imperial Clan
Zuo Zhonglang Jiang	左中郎將	General of the Gentlemen-of-the-Household of the Left	General of the Palace Gentlemen of the Left	General of the Household of the Left	Leader of Court Gentlemen of the Left	Leader of the Gentlemen of the Palace of the Left
