= Political systems of Imperial China =

The political systems of Imperial China can be divided into a state administrative body, provincial administrations, and a system for official selection. The three notable tendencies in the history of Chinese politics includes the convergence of unity, the capital priority of absolute monarchy, and the standardization of official selection. Moreover, there were early supervisory systems that were originated by local factions, as well as other political systems worthy of mention.

== Fundamental system: Autocratic monarchy ==
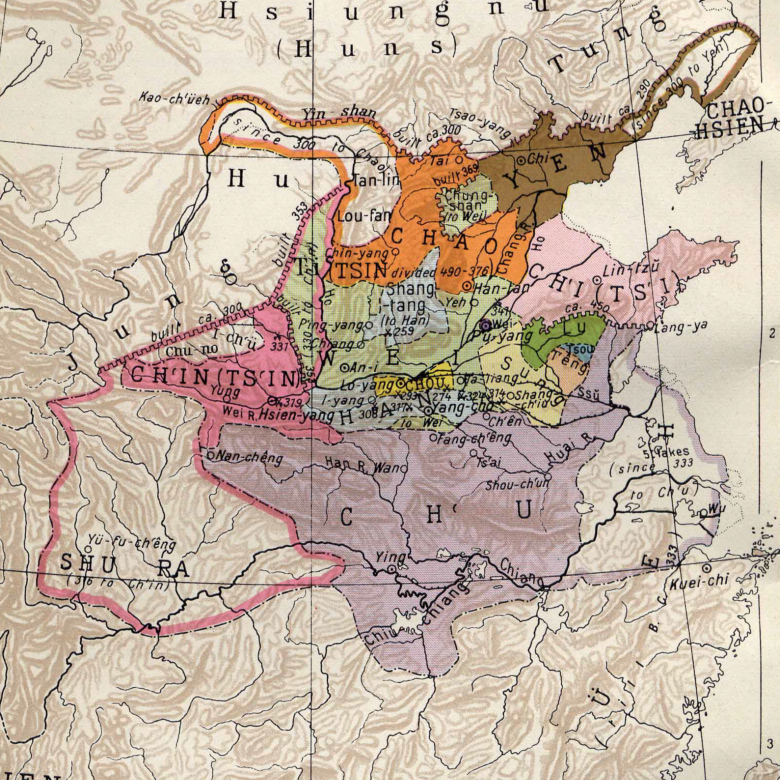
Warring States period (453 BC – 221 BC)

=== Principles and foundation ===
During the Warring States period, Shang Yang from the state of Wei would enact political reforms into practice. The ancient Chinese text Han Feizi proposed the establishment of the first all-encompassing autocratic monarchy for the future of the state.The imperial system would eventually be constituted by the time of the establishment of the Qin, which would introduce the system of Three Lords and Nine Ministers as well as fostering the system of prefectures and counties. Units of measurements, currency, and writing would be standardized, books and scholars of the previous regime burned and buried to keep ideological integrity, and officials were to act as faculties of the law.

=== Consolidation and reinforcement ===
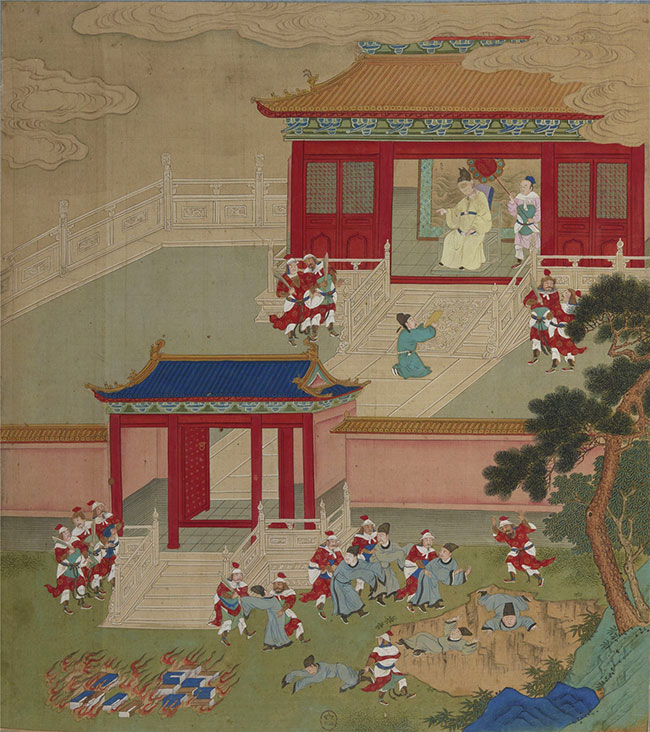
Killing the Scholars and Burning the Books (18th century Chinese painting).

In order to settle domestic concerns, Western Han conducted capital punishments, issued the Decree of Mercy and the Law of Supplementary Benefits, denounced the Hundred Schools of Thought, and only extolled Confucianism. By instituting the system of three departments and six ministries, the feudal bureaucracy diminished the prime minister's power and reinforced imperial power. Complementary to this governing body, establishment and improvement of the Imperial Civil Examination improved the availability of qualified government officials. Regulation of military power removed total military authority from senior generals and local commanders in favor of centralized control by three government officials. Within the framework of organized executive power; the administration, the military, the financial powers of the chief ministers, the privy Councillors, and the three Secretaries partitioned and absorbed the authorities of the prime minister. Regulation of financial power was acquired by arranging consignments on appropriate levels of operations to coordinate local finances. Finally, standardization of judicial powers was executed via dispatching of civil officials to serve as local judiciaries. These means and measures concentrated power with the head of state.

=== Further development and final shape ===
In the central government, the executive system of central officials was improved during Yuan dynasty. It established the Xuanzheng Yua (the Bureau of Buddhist and Tibetan Affairs) to direct religious affairs and to govern the region of Tibet. At the local level, the provincial system was practiced. At the beginning of the Ming dynasty, the prime minister was abolished, and the power was divided into six departments. The local government implemented the division of power among the three functioning departments. The Qing dynasty followed the system of the Ming dynasty, set up more military offices, put up literary prisons, thus strengthened the centralisation of authoritarianism.

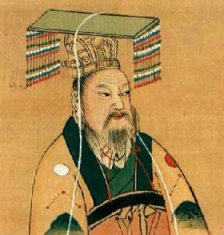
First Emperor of Qin (18 February 259 BC – 10 September 210 BC)

== Central political system ==
=== Three Lords and Nine Ministers system ===
The three lords and nine ministers system was a central administrative system adopted in ancient China that was officially instituted in Qin dynasty and later developed in Han dynasty.

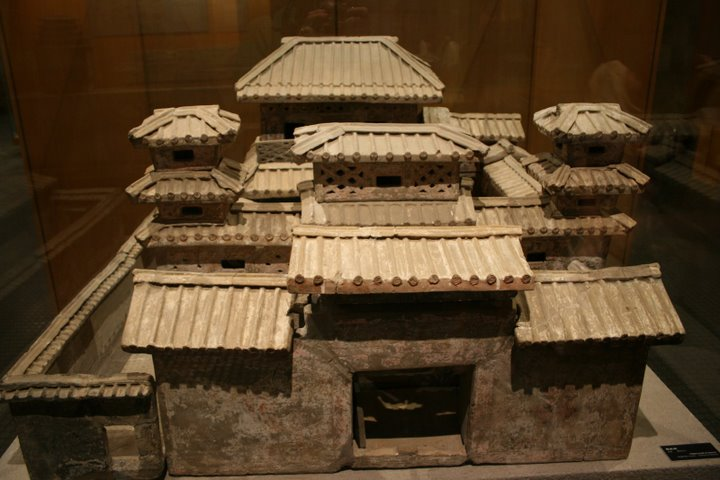
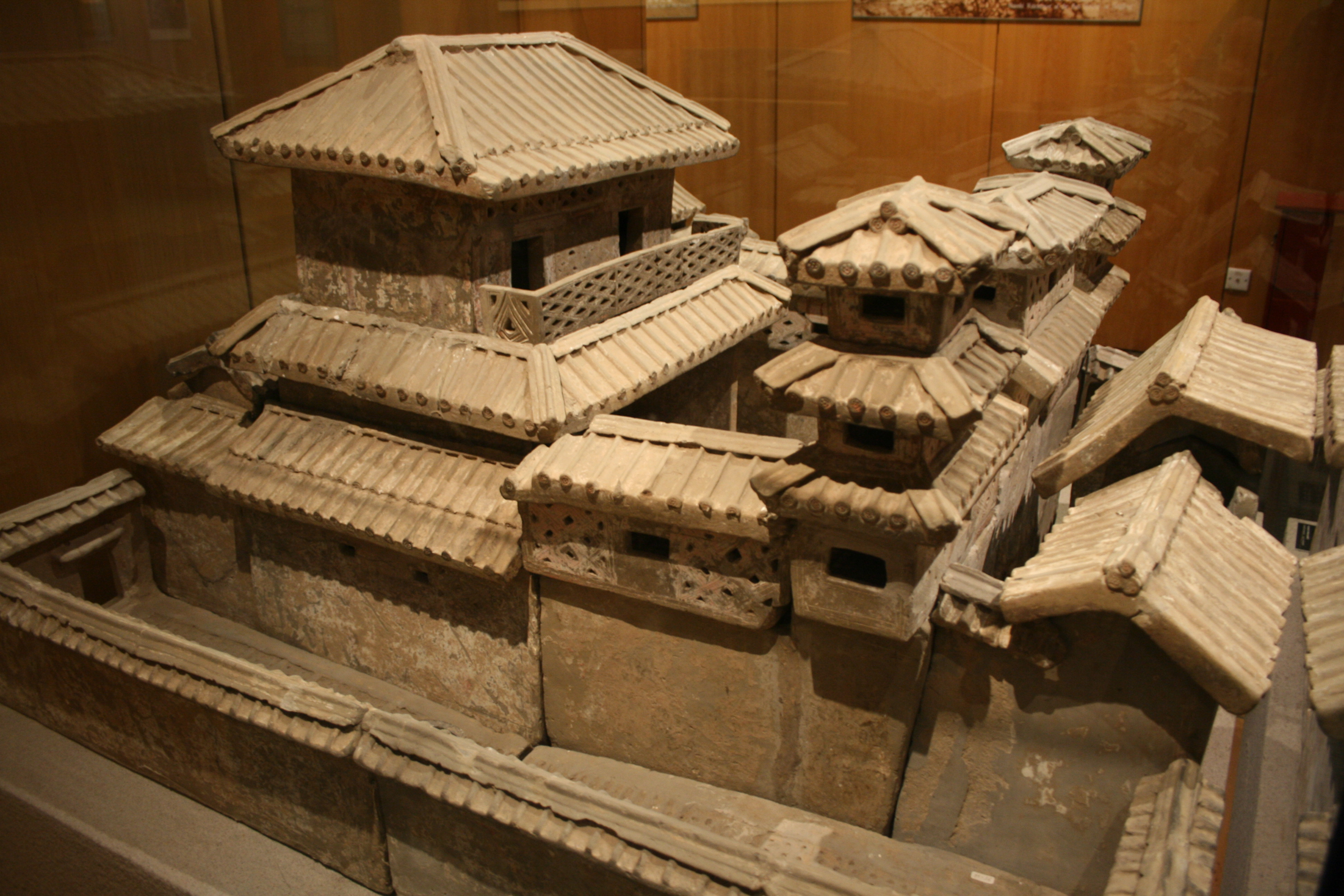
A pottery model of a palace from a Han dynasty tomb; the entrances to the emperor's imperial palaces were strictly guarded by the Commandant of Guards, and if it was found that a commoner, official, or noble entered without explicit permission via a tally system, they were liable for execution.

Three Lords referred to three highest rank officials in the imperial government, namely:

- the Chancellor
- the Imperial Secretary
- the Grand Commandant

Nine Ministers comprised all the ministers of importance in the central government. They were:

- the Minister of Ceremonies
- the Supervisor of Attendants
- the Commandant of Guards
- the Minister of Coachmen
- the Commandant of Justice
- the Grand Herald
- the Director of the Imperial Clan
- the Grand Minister of Agriculture
- the Small Treasurer

=== Three departments and six ministries system ===
The three lords and nine ministers system was replaced by the system of three departments and six ministries by Emperor Wen of the Sui dynasty. The three departments were Shangshu, Zhongshu and Menxia. The central committee was responsible for drafting and issuing imperial edicts; Subordinate provinces shall be responsible for the examination and verification of administrative decrees; Shangshu was responsible for carrying out important state decrees, and the heads of the three provinces were all prime ministers. The six ministries were officials, households, rites, soldiers, punishments, and workers. The separation of the three powers weakened the power of the prime minister and strengthened the imperial power.

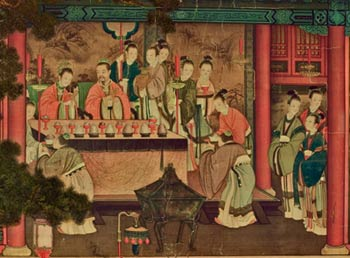
Emperor Wu of Han (30 July 157 BC – 29 March 87 BC)

Emperor (皇帝, huángdì)
Chancellery (t 門下省, s 门下省, Ménxiàshěng)	Department of State Affairs (t 尚書省, s 尚书省, Shàngshūshěng)	Secretariat (t 中書省, s 中书省, Zhōngshūshěng)
Ministry of Personnel (吏部, Lìbù)	Ministry of Revenue (t 戶部, s 户部, Hùbù)	Ministry of Rites (t 禮部, s 礼部, Lǐbù)	Ministry of War (兵部, Bīngbù)	Ministry of Justice (刑部, Xíngbù)	Ministry of Works (工部, Gōngbù)

Prime Minister Wang of Song (December 8, 1021 – May 21, 1086)

=== Prime minister system ===
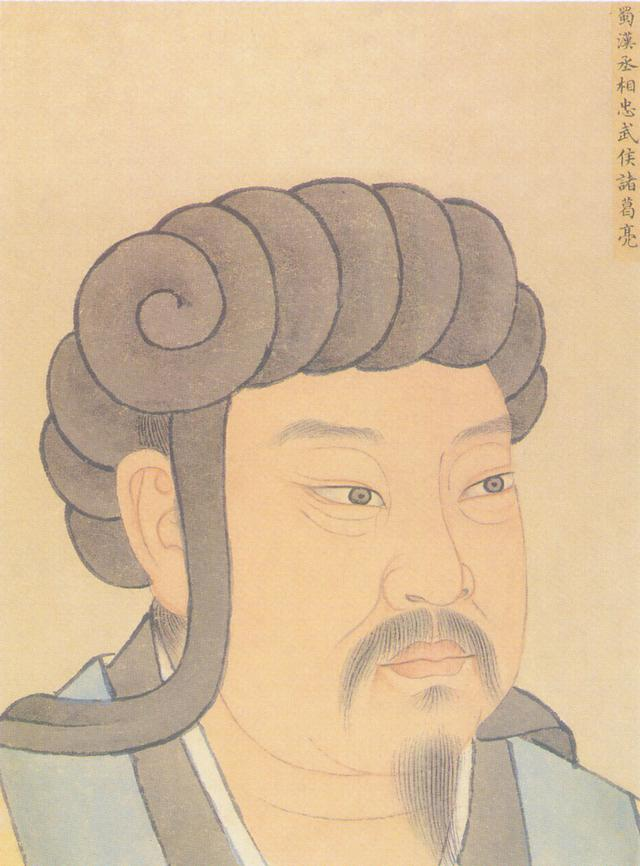
Prime Minister Zhuge of Shu (181–234)

Qin established the system of three lords and nine ministers in the central government. Emperor Wu of the Western Han dynasty reformed the official system implemented the internal and external dynasties system and weakened the power of the prime minister. Emperor Guangwu of the Eastern Han dynasty expanded the power of the Shangshu department. Sui and Tang dynasties established the system of three provinces and six departments, dividing the power of the prime minister into three and containing each other, which reflected the strengthening of the imperial power. In the northern song dynasty, under the chancellors, the chief ministers were appointed as deputy ministers to divide the administrative power of the chancellors. There were privy secretaries to divide the military power and three divisions to divide the financial power. The Yuan dynasty set up a Zhongshu province, with prime ministers on the right and left, exercising the functions and powers of prime ministers. The Ming dynasty abolished the prime minister and divided the power into six parts. Emperor Yongle set up a cabinet and implemented "draft vote." The military offices were set up in the Qing dynasty, and the remnants of the prime minister system disappeared, reflecting that the imperial power had reached its peak. From the changes, we can see that the emperor divided and weakened the power of the prime minister, gradually concentrated all kinds of power in his own hands, and thus effectively implemented the autocratic monarchy. Notable prime ministers include Prime Minister Zhu of Shu, Prime Minister Xiao of Western Han and Prime Minister Wang of Song.

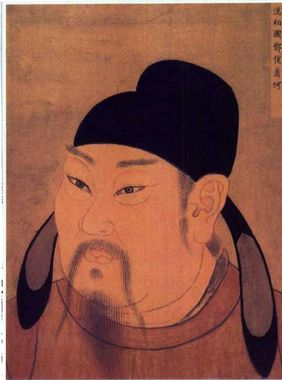
Prime Minister Xiao of Western Han (257–193)

== Local political systems ==
=== Enfeoffment system ===
To consolidate the power of slave owners, the rulers of the Western Zhou dynasty implemented the system of enfeoff vassals politically, which enabled the Zhou dynasty to consolidate its rule and expand its territory. In the spring and autumn period, it gradually collapsed and was replaced by the system of prefectures and counties, which remained in some later dynasties.

=== Prefecture and county system ===
During the Spring and Autumn period and the Warring States period, the Qin dynasty was carried out nationwide, thus replacing the feudal system nationwide, weakening the independence of local authorities and strengthening the centralization of power.

=== Province system ===
At the beginning of the Western Han dynasty, the system of prefectures and counties was implemented in local areas, and at the same time, the system of enfeoffment was established. Counties and countries were parallel to each other, which was not conducive to the unified management of the country, with the risk of division. The Yuan dynasty was a feudal country with a vast territory at that time. Its establishment consolidated the unification of the country and ensured the centralization of power in the system. The provincial system of the Yuan dynasty had a far-reaching influence on the political system of later generations. Since then, the provincial system has become the local administrative organ of China, which was followed in the Ming and Qing dynasties and has been retained until today.

Administrative structure of Western Han
Administrative unit	Administrator title	Appointment	Authority
Province (州 zhou)	Governor (牧 mu)	Central	Executive
Province (州 zhou)	Inspector (刺史 cishi)	Central	No direct authority
Commandery (郡 jun)	Grand administrator (太守 taishou)	Central	Executive
Kingdom (王國 wangguo)	Chancellor (相 xiang)	Central	Executive
Kingdom (王國 wangguo)	King (王 wang)	Hereditary	Symbolic
County (縣 xian)	Prefect (令 ling); Chief (長 zhang)	Central	Executive

=== Monk system ===
In the Ming dynasty, Tibet practiced the system of monks and officials. Because the Tibetan people believed in Tibetan Buddhism, the Ming government used religion to rule the Tibetan people which was later called the 'monk system'.

=== Eight banners system ===
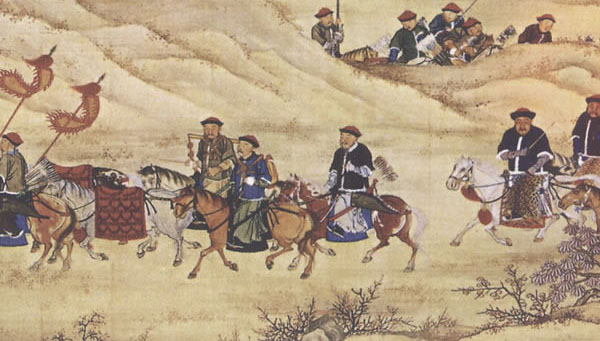
Eight Banners (1615–1701)

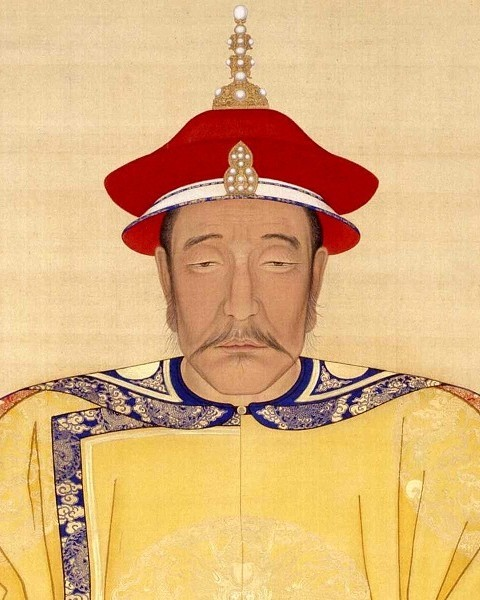
Nuzhen Ruler Nurhaci (8 April 1559 – 30 September 1626)

The eight banners system was in the late Ming dynasty when Nuzhen rulers Nurhaci to create a system of eight banners system according to the military organization form the Jurchen establishment, controlled by the aristocrat, with military conquering three functions, administrative management, organize production, is a soldier and unity of social organization, is a military organization and administrative management system, promote the development of the Nuzhen society. The eight banners army played an important role in unifying China in the Qing dynasty. However, with the invasion of western capitalism, the corruption of the eight banners army itself and the gradual decline of its combat effectiveness, the Hunan army and Huai army, which rose up in the process of suppressing the Taiping Heavenly Kingdom, had a great impact on it.

=== Bureaucratisation of local officers ===
During the reign of the Ming dynasty, in successive congruity with the Yuan dynasty, installed and enforced a provincial system in the southwest region, where residential officials received sponsorship from the central government. These residential officials, held by local factions, exercised their administration within their jurisdiction until the fall of the Great Ming.

== Official selection system ==
=== Evolution of official selection ===
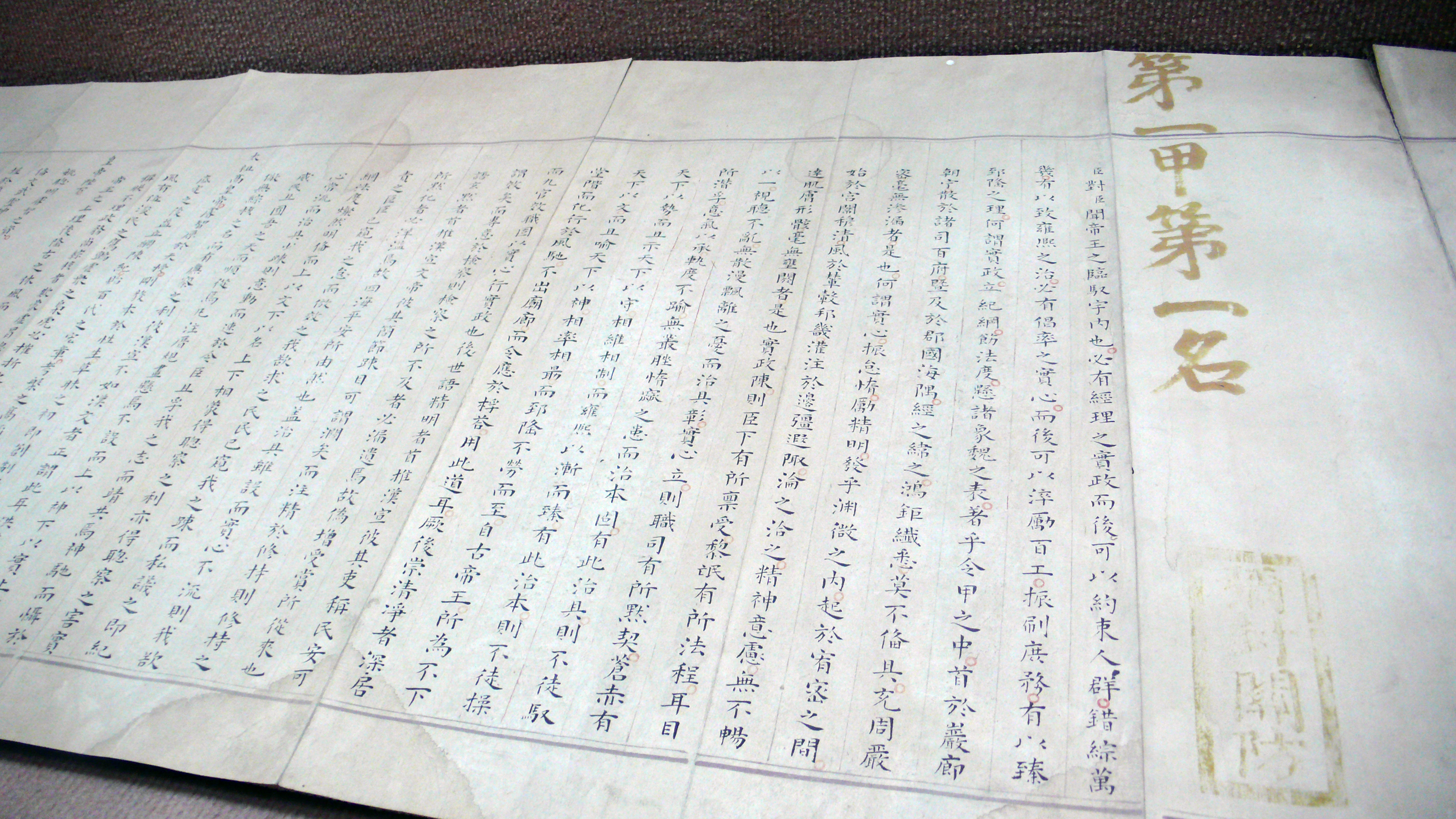
Imperial examination paper of Ming dynasty in 1598 AD

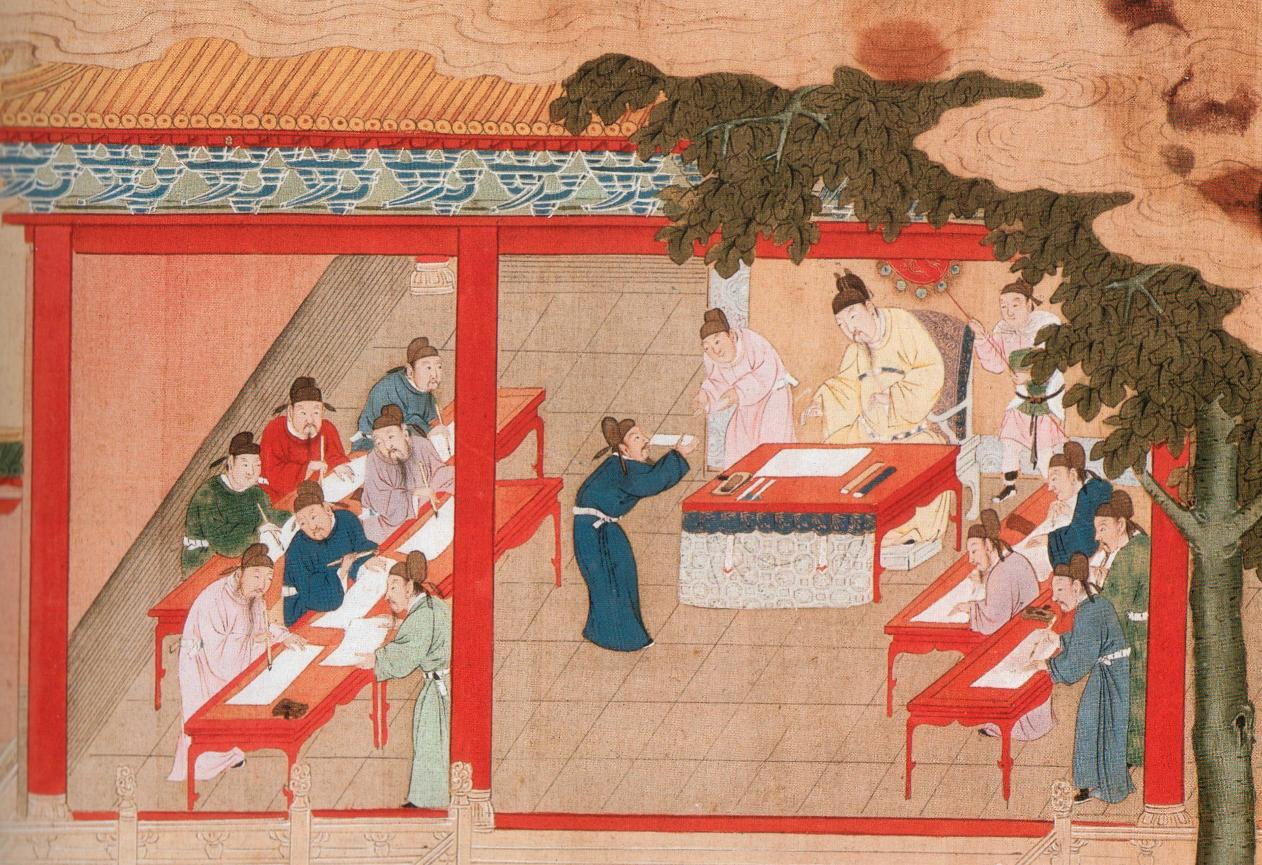
The emperor receives a candidate during the Palace Examination.

The standard of Official Selection by familial history gradually developed to emphasize talent instead. This method would eventually progress to form the standard of public examinations, to which this mechanism of cultivating talent would be institutionalized, making examinations a notoriously rigorous process.

Examination and degree hierarchy
Degree	Ranks	Exam	Times held
Child student (Tongsheng)		County/Prefectural	Annual (February/April)
Student member (Shengyuan)	Granary student (1st class); Expanded student (2nd class); Attached student (3rd class)	College	Triennial (twice)
Recommended man (Juren)	Top escorted examinee (1st rank)	Provincial	Triennial
Tribute scholar (Gongshi)	Top conference examinee (1st rank)	Metropolitan	Triennial
Advanced scholar (Jinshi)	Top thesis author (1st rank); Eyes positioned alongside (2nd rank); Flower snatcher (3rd rank)	Palace	Triennial

== Imperial supervision systems ==
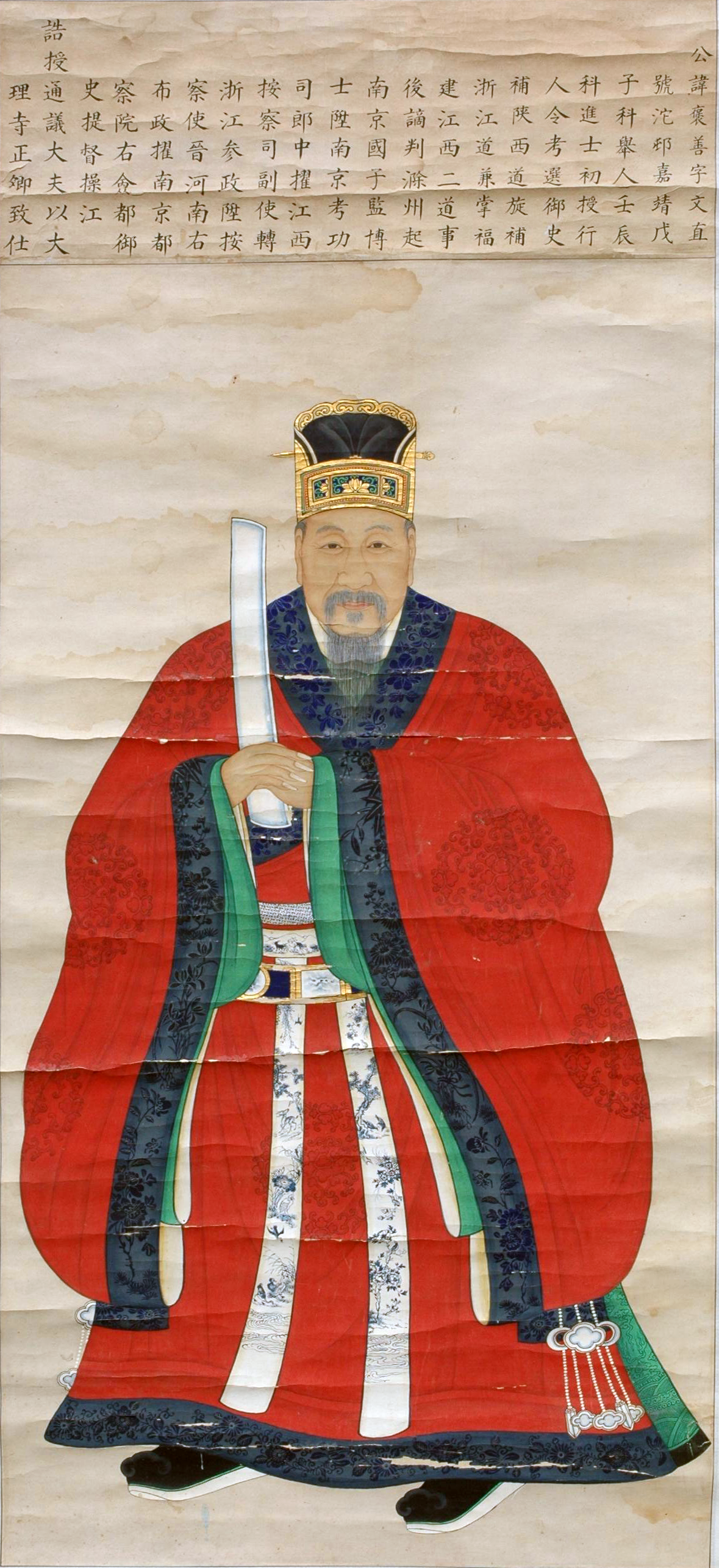
Supervisor Shi of Ming (1499–1562)

=== Qin dynasty ===
The central government set up the imperial historian, whereas the local government set up the imperial supervisor.

=== Western Han dynasty ===
Emperor Wudi of the Han dynasty set 13 prefectures as the supervision area, and set the provincial history department for supervision.

=== Eastern Han dynasty ===
The supervision power of the provincial governor was further strengthened, and the local administrative power and military power were gradually increased. At the end of the Eastern Han dynasty, the provincial governor evolved into the local highest military and political officer.

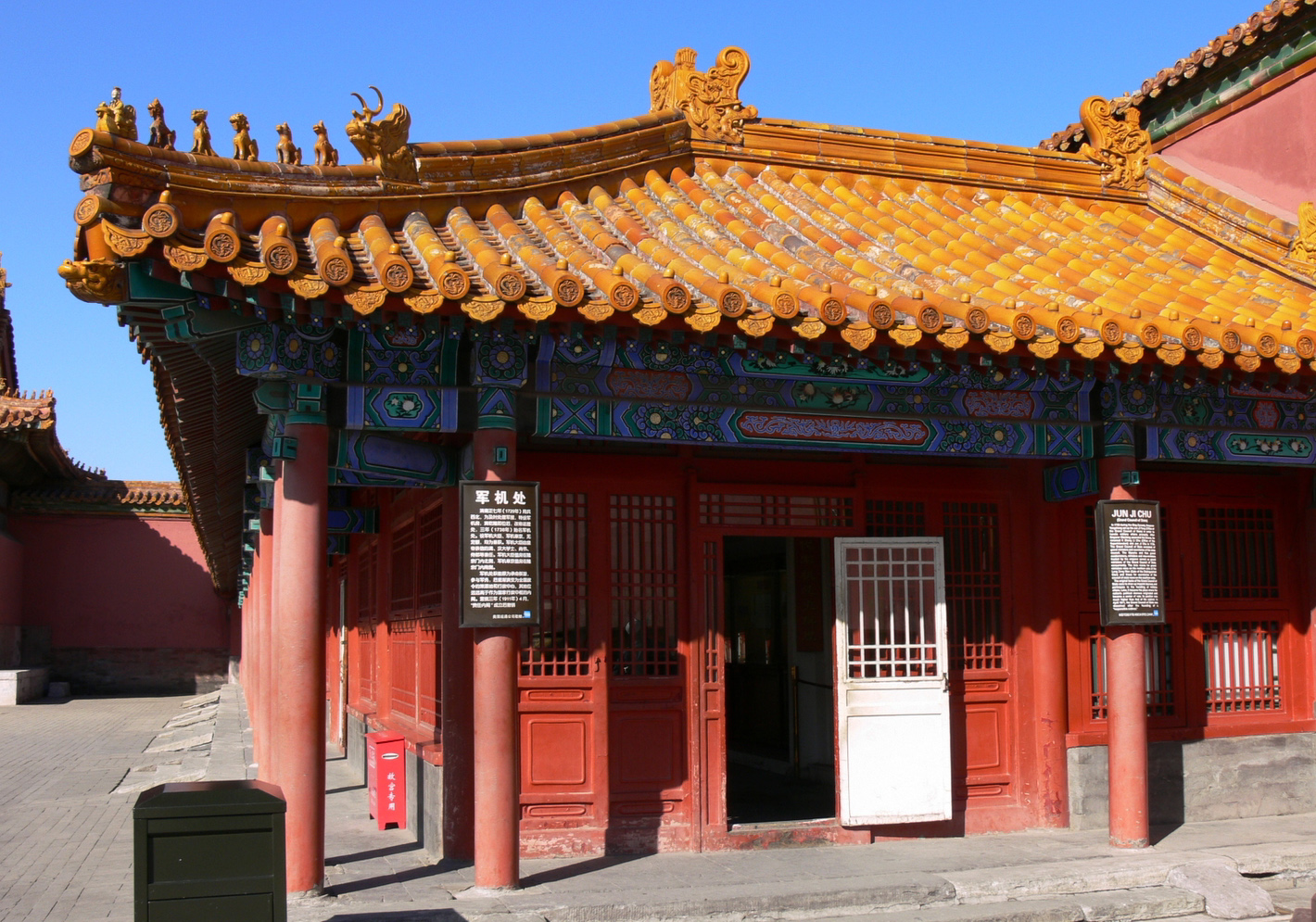
Department of Criminal Investigation, Ming dynasty (1368–1644)

=== Northern Song dynasty ===
There was a general court to supervise the prefectures, which could report directly to the emperor.

=== Ming dynasty ===
The local government set up the department of criminal investigation to administer local supervision and justice. In addition, the factory also set up a spying agency to monitor officials and civilians at all levels.

== Political systems created by local factions ==
Uniform land system, rent modulation, government military system, Fan-Han divide and rule system, fierce peace and restraint, provincial system, and the eight banner system are critical systems created by local factions of noteworthy historical mention.

== Other critical political systems in ancient China ==
=== Eclectical system ===
During the closing era of archaic society, the selective appointment of affiliated alliance leaders was conducted within the circle of noble families. This was not only reflective of antiquating public participation in politics, but also a sign of archaic society's vestiges.

=== Hereditary system ===
A hereditary system with its distinctive privatization embodied the significant progress of society.

=== Patriarchal systems ===
Since the Western Zhou dynasty, the patriarchal clan system was a system in which the inheritance relationship and the title were determined by blood relationship and marital status. The patriarchal clan system and privilege system formed by the patriarchal system had a far-reaching influence on later generations.

=== Gentry system ===
The gentry was developed from influential landlords and belonged to the most prestigious stratum of the landlord class. The gentry system was formed during the Wei and Jin dynastic era. This system selected officials in accordance to the level of their familial backgrounds, though it was often notably plagued by corruption.

== See also ==
- Government of the Han dynasty
- Government of the Ming dynasty
- Government of the Qing dynasty

== See also ==
- History of China
