= Court of Imperial Entertainments =

Government Agency

- 光祿寺

Agency overview
- Formed: 550 (Northern Qi)
- Dissolved: 1912 (Qing dynasty)
- Parent department: Ministry of Rites

Court of Imperial Entertainments

Chinese name
- Traditional Chinese: 光祿寺
- Simplified Chinese: 光禄寺
Transcriptions
Standard Mandarin
- Hanyu Pinyin: Guānglùsì
- Wade–Giles: Kuang^{1}-lu^{4}-ssu^{4}

Vietnamese name
- Vietnamese alphabet: Quang lộc tự
- Hán-Nôm: 光祿寺

The Court of Imperial Entertainments, also known as the Court of Imperial Banquets, was a central government agency in several imperial Chinese and Vietnamese dynasties. It was generally in charge of catering for the imperial household, central government officials, and imperial banquets honoring foreign envoys and other dignitaries. In China, the office was created during the Northern Qi dynasty (550–577) and continued until the Qing dynasty (1644–1912). In Vietnam, it was created by Lê Thánh Tông in 1466 and continued until the Nguyễn dynasty.

It was one of the Nine Courts and normally under the supervision of the Ministry of Rites.
