= Government of the Qing dynasty =

Government of the Great Qing
- 大清政府
- Seal of the Great Qing

Overview
- Established: 15 May 1636
- Dissolved: 12 February 1912
- Leader: Emperor
- Main organ: De jure: Grand Secretariat; De facto: Deliberative Council of Princes and Ministers (1627–1792); Grand Council (1733–1911); Advisory Council (1906–1912)
- Ministries: Ministry of Personnel; Ministry of Revenue; Ministry of Rites; Ministry of War; Ministry of Justice; Ministry of Works

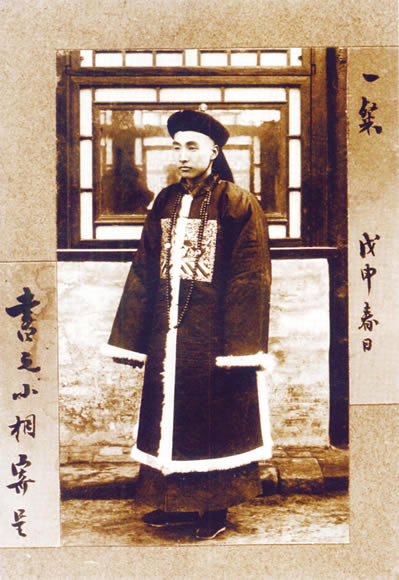
A Qing dynasty mandarin

The Qing dynasty (1644–1912) was the last imperial dynasty of China. The early Qing emperors adopted the bureaucratic structures and institutions from the preceding Ming dynasty but split rule between the Han and Manchus with some positions also given to Mongols. Like previous dynasties, the Qing recruited officials via the imperial examination system until the system was abolished in 1905. The Qing divided the positions into civil and military positions, each having nine grades or ranks, each subdivided into a and b categories. Civil appointments ranged from an attendant to the emperor or a grand secretary in the Forbidden City (highest) to being a prefectural tax collector, deputy jail warden, deputy police commissioner, or tax examiner. Military appointments ranged from being a field marshal or chamberlain of the imperial bodyguard to a third class sergeant, corporal or a first or second class private.

== Central government agencies ==
The formal structure of the Qing government centered on the emperor as the absolute ruler, who presided over six Boards (Ministries (Note: Chinese: 六部; pinyin: lìubù)), each headed by two presidents (Note: traditional Chinese: 尚書; simplified Chinese: 尚书; pinyin: shàngshū; Manchu: ᠠᠯᡳᡥᠠ ᠠᠮᠪᠠᠨ, Möllendorff: aliha amban, Abkai: aliha amban) and assisted by four vice presidents. (Note: Chinese: 侍郎; pinyin: shìláng; Manchu: ᠠᠰᡥᠠᠨ ᡳ ᠠᠮᠪᠠᠨ, Möllendorff: ashan i amban, Abkai: ashan-i amban) In contrast to the Ming system, however, Qing ethnic policy dictated that appointments were split between Manchu noblemen and Han officials who had passed the highest levels of the state examinations. The Grand Secretariat, (Note: traditional Chinese: 內閣; simplified Chinese: 内阁; pinyin: nèigé; Manchu: ᡩᠣᡵᡤᡳ ᠶᠠᠮᡠᠨ, Möllendorff: dorgi yamun, Abkai: dorgi yamun) which had been an important policy-making body under the Ming, lost its importance during the Qing and evolved into an imperial chancery. The institutions which had been inherited from the Ming formed the core of the Qing "Outer Court", which handled routine matters and was located in the southern part of the Forbidden City.

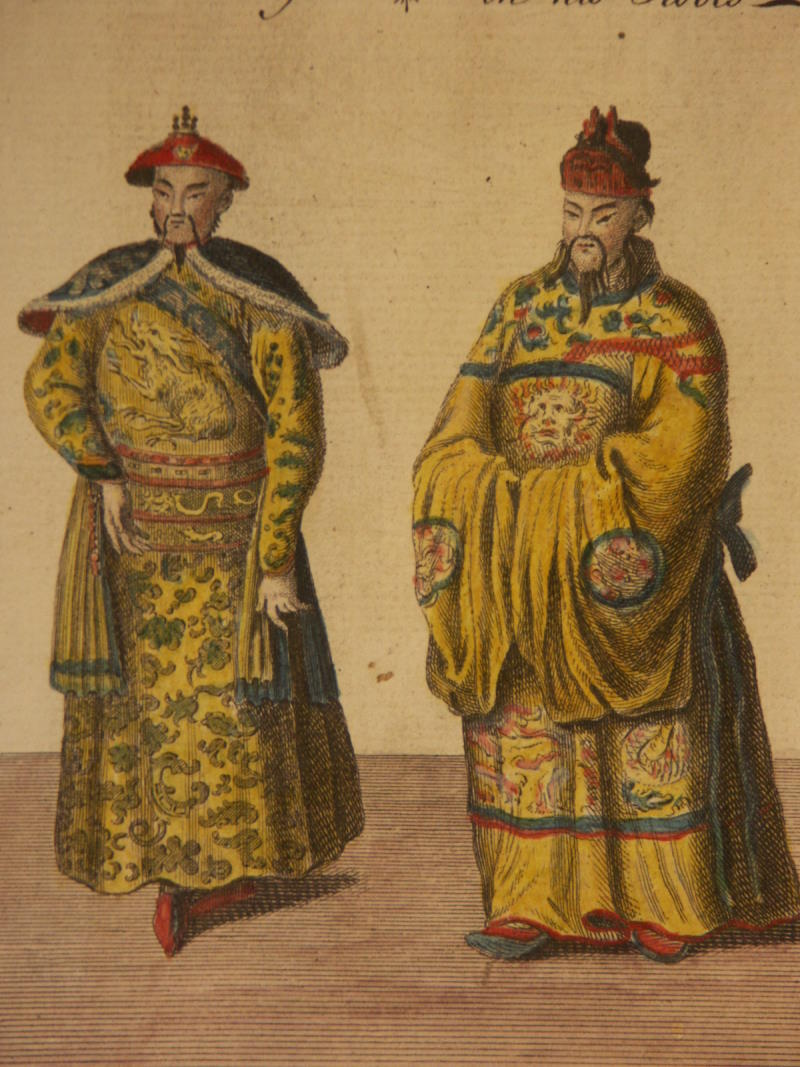
The emperor of China from The Universal Traveller

In order not to let the routine administration take over the running of the empire, the Qing emperors made sure that all important matters were decided in the "Inner Court", which was dominated by the imperial family and Manchu nobility and which was located in the northern part of the Forbidden City. The core institution of the inner court was the Grand Council. (Note: traditional Chinese: 軍機處; simplified Chinese: 军机处; pinyin: jūnjī chù; Manchu: ᠴᠣᡠ᠋ᡥᠠᡳ ᠨᠠᠰᡥᡡᠨ ᡳ ᠪᠠ, Möllendorff: coohai nashūn i ba, Abkai: qouhai nashvn-i ba) It emerged in the 1720s under the reign of the Yongzheng Emperor as a body charged with handling Qing military campaigns against the Mongols, but soon took over other military and administrative duties, centralizing authority under the crown. The grand councillors (Note: traditional Chinese: 軍機大臣; simplified Chinese: 军机大臣; pinyin: jūnjī dàchén) served as a sort of privy council to the emperor.

The Six Ministries and their respective areas of responsibilities were as follows:

Board of Civil Appointments (Note: Chinese: 吏部; pinyin: lìbù; Manchu: ᡥᠠᡶᠠᠨ ᡳ ᠵᡠᡵᡤᠠᠨ, Möllendorff: hafan i jurgan, Abkai: hafan-i jurgan)

The personnel administration of all civil officials – including evaluation, promotion, and dismissal. It was also in charge of the "honours list".

Board of Revenue (Note: 戶部; 户部; hùbù; Manchu: ᠪᠣᡳ᠌ᡤᠣᠨ ᡳ ᠵᡠᡵᡤᠠᠨ, Möllendorff: boigon i jurgan, Abkai: boigon-i jurgan)

The literal translation of the Chinese word hu (戶; 户) is "household". For much of Qing history, the government's main source of revenue came from taxation on landownership supplemented by official monopolies on salt, which was an essential household item, and tea. Thus, in the predominantly agrarian Qing dynasty, the "household" was the basis of imperial finance. The department was charged with revenue collection and the financial management of the government.
The Board of Revenue was second in importance only to the Board of Civil appointments which was ranked first. It followed the Qing practice of 1 supervising minister (normally Manchu) and 2 ministers (1 Manchu 1 Chinese) and 2 vice-ministers (1 Manchu 1 Chinese). The Board was tasked with keeping a record of lands, provincial borders and conducting a census. The Board also controlled the collection of taxes, non-military salaries, auditing of their provincial counterparts both their treasuries and granaries as well as the central treasury, the transportation of taxes and tributes. Additionally, its responsibilities included coinage, the custom house network and the system of weights and measurements alongside the Department of works.
The Board had 14 bureaus which were responsible to it:
- The Board of Jiangsu and Anhui, which was responsible for land and poll taxes in the aforementioned provinces as well as the accounts of the government silk factories in Suzhou and Nanjing. It also was responsible for the arrears of taxes the provinces might be responsible for and making sure the weight stated by the provinces was true.
- The Bureau of Zhejiang, which was responsible for the land and poll taxes in Zhejiang and the government silk factories at Hangzhou as well as reporting annually to the emperor the population and grain production of the Empire
- The Bureau of Jiangxi, which was responsible for the land and poll taxes of Jiangxi and to audit and reports of inter-provincial support of its military expenses.
- The Bureau of Fujian, which was responsible for the accounts of Zhili and Fujian, auditing the miscellaneous expenses of Zhili which drew from the central treasury, to audit customs collected at Tianjin, to administer all government relief work, auditing rent received for housing by the government for bannermen, to control the orchards of the Imperial Household Department and the nomadic prairie of Qiqihar.
- The Bureau of Huguang, which was responsible for the land and poll taxes of Huguang, auditing customs collected inland in Hubei, auditing surcharges on the taxes of land, salt, tea and commodities across the empire
- The Bureau of Shandong, which was responsible for auditing the accounts of Shandong, Liaoning, Jilin and Heilongjiang, to pay the officers of the 8 banners and control the government monopolies of salt and Ginseng.
- The Bureau of Shanxi to audit the accounts of Shanxi
- The Bureau of Shaanxi, which was responsible for auditing Shaanxi, Gansu and Xinjiang, controlling the government tea monopoly, to act as the paymaster of the empire except where specified.
- The Bureau of Henan, which was responsible for the land and poll taxes of Henan, to audit the expenses of troops in Qiqihar, to encourage the revisions of reports rejected by the Board, to investigate reports sent to it and report to the emperor and act upon his instructions.
- The Bureau of Sichuan, which was responsible for the land and poll taxes of Sichuan, auditing customs in Sichuan, to control all confiscated material, to report on crop conditions across the empire.
- The Bureau of Guangdong, which was responsible for the land and poll taxes of Guangdong, to control the bannermen succession and assign Han members and control assignments of the Board.
- The Bureau of Guangxi, which was responsible for the land and poll taxes of Guangxi, the customs of Guangxi, the direction and administration of the Beijing mints and the regulation of coinage as well as mining.
- The Bureau of Yunnan, which was responsible for the land and poll taxes of Yunnan, the mining royalties of Yunnan, to control the transportation of grain to Beijing in select provinces.
- The Bureau of Guizhou, which was responsible for the land and poll taxes of Guizhou, the inland and maritime customs and the auditing of the fur tributes.

The Board also controlled the relief in the event of natural disasters and maintained a granary reserve of 18,250,000 shih of grain, the practice of private granaries was also protected and both private and state granaries were guarded by bannermen. In the event of disaster the Board would often cancel tax arrears or reduce the current taxes or even not collect taxes for a time, charitable works would also be organised such as orphanages, hospitals, poorhouses, widows and the shipwrecked.

The board recorded the total size of the empire to be 1,047,783,839 Mou of land of which 70% belonged to the people, 7.8% to the military who farmed it with soldiers, 1.9% by bannermen and Imperial Clansmen, 17% frontier land which could be claimed by any citizen, 0.58% as official land and 0.1% as scholars land. Most farms during the period were reported to be small and not exceeding several Mou in size.

There were two types of taxes, the land-poll tax and commodity taxes. In 1713 the Kangxi Emperor decided that the census of that year should be used for setting the poll tax to avoid tax dodging this census was still quoted in government figures in 1887 despite the rapid growth in population in the intervening 174 years. The Poll tax was eventually combined with the land tax in 1857 almost universally, only government, sacrificial and hunting land was exempt from this alongside canals and barracks. The magistrates who collected taxes levied a 10% surcharge on the collection which was sanctioned by the Kangxi emperor in 1709 this was routinely abused however and peasants were exploited and charged higher surcharges with instances of a 50% surcharge. Despite the reputation of corruption within the Qing dynasty the collection of taxes was efficient and regular and the chief duty of magistrates was to collect taxes and this was done twice annually in spring and autumn with 2 months available for payment per period with an equal apportionment per collection. It was regular for taxes to be waived in poorer regions on an account of bad harvest as the continued collection would make the emperor appear as a tyrant. Taxes were collected per group of households 5 or 10 and each was summoned to pay taxes with records kept by the taxpayer, the magistrate and Beijing the burden of paying taxes was given to the payer though in the event of a failure to pay the Magistrate would hire professional collectors. However, there was no uniform tax rate and it varied considerably from over 2.9 taels per mou in Hubei to 0.0002 in Gansu. Thus in 1887 on 1,047,783,839 mou of land the Board only collected 31,184,042 taels an average of 0.31 per Mou a very low rate of taxation.

Board of Rites (Note: simplified Chinese: 礼部; traditional Chinese: 禮部; pinyin: lǐbù; Manchu: ᡩᠣᡵᠣᠯᠣᠨ ᡳ ᠵᡠᡵᡤᠠᠨ, Möllendorff: dorolon i jurgan, Abkai: dorolon-i jurgan)

This board was responsible for all matters concerning court protocol. It organized the periodic worship of ancestors and various gods by the emperor, managed relations with tributary nations, and oversaw the nationwide civil examination system.

Board of War (Note: Chinese: 兵部; pinyin: bīngbù; Manchu: ᠴᠣᡠ᠋ᡥᠠᡳ ᠵᡠᡵᡤᠠᠨ, Möllendorff: coohai jurgan, Abkai: qouhai jurgan)

Unlike its Ming predecessor, which had full control over all military matters, the Qing Board of War had very limited powers. First, the Eight Banners were under the direct control of the emperor and hereditary Manchu and Mongol princes, leaving only the Green Standard Army under ministerial control. Furthermore, the ministry's functions were purely administrative. Campaigns and troop movements were monitored and directed by the emperor, first through the Manchu ruling council and later through the Grand Council.

The Board contained four Bureaus:

The Bureau of Military section, which handled the organisation of army corps and the appointment and dismissal of officials, as well as their ranks and titles.

The Bureau of Statistics, for the reward, punishment, and investigation of officials, as well as for defense, policing, and issuing passports for those leaving the country and enforcing regulations.

The Bureau of Communications, which managed the supply of horses and the relay communication system.

The Commissariat Bureau, which handled the records of servicemen, the recruitment of officers from the examinations, and the supply of ammunition and uniforms.

The division of the Board into four Bureaus did not follow a scientific process and it was confused and unsatisfactory.

As in many organisations in the Qing government, appointments were made based on racial background. Certain positions could only be held by bannermen, while others (namely, those in the provincial forces) were exclusively Chinese. Guard posts for rivers and canals were also exclusively Chinese, whereas gate posts for city gates were exclusively held by Chinese bannermen, though this exclusivity was not always present. Many of the bannermen were given concurrent appointments, holding multiple offices that did not give them work but gave them a title. Only the Zenone or Tartar-General (the commander of a province's forces) were not given concurrent appointments.

The confused organisation of troops led to severe organisational and command issues and led to a lack of standardisation. The provincial commander in chief would command a couple thousand men in Canton as would the governor of Guangdong and the viceroy of Liangguang, each would maintain their own distinct forces. The viceroy could technically command the other two being a higher-ranked official but the governor could also command the provincial commander in chief simultaneously the provincial commander in chief was the Supreme Military official of the province; however, other circuits did not have to heed the orders of the provincial commander in chief as his control was indirect thus in a province there was no singular military official.

Board of Punishments (Note: Chinese: 刑部; pinyin: xíngbù; Manchu: ᠪᡝᡳ᠌ᡩᡝᡵᡝ ᠵᡠᡵᡤᠠᠨ, Möllendorff: beidere jurgan, Abkai: beidere jurgan)

The Board of Punishments handled all legal matters, including the supervision of various law courts and prisons. The Qing legal framework was relatively weak compared to modern-day legal systems, as there was no separation of executive and legislative branches of government. The legal system could be inconsistent, and, at times, arbitrary, because the emperor ruled by decree and had final say on all judicial outcomes. Emperors could (and did) overturn judgements of lower courts from time to time. Fairness of treatment was also an issue under the system of control practised by the Manchu government over the Han Chinese majority. To counter these inadequacies and keep the population in line, the Qing government maintained a very harsh penal code towards the Han populace, but it was no more severe than previous Chinese dynasties.

Board of Works (Note: Chinese: 工部; pinyin: gōngbù; Manchu: ᠸᡝᡳ᠌ᠯᡝᡵᡝ ᠵᡠᡵᡤᠠᠨ, Möllendorff: weilere jurgan, Abkai: weilere jurgan)

The Board of Works handled all governmental building projects, including palaces, temples and the repairs of waterways and flood canals. It was also in charge of minting coinage.

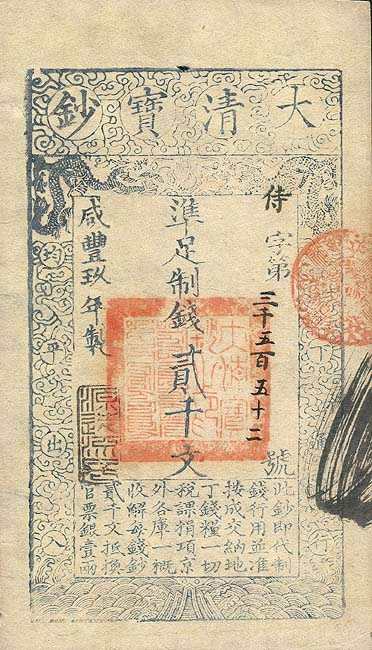
2000–cash Great Qing Treasure Note banknote from 1859

From the early Qing, the central government was characterized by a system of dual appointments by which each position in the central government had a Manchu and a Han Chinese assigned to it. The Han Chinese appointee was required to do the substantive work and the Manchu to ensure Han loyalty to Qing rule. While the Qing government was established as an absolute monarchy like previous dynasties in China, by the early 20th century however the Qing court began to move towards a constitutional monarchy, with government bodies like the Advisory Council established and a parliamentary election to prepare for a constitutional government.

In addition to the six boards, there was a Lifan Yuan (Note: Chinese: 理藩院; pinyin: Lǐfànyuàn; Manchu: ᡨᡠᠯᡝᡵᡤᡳ ᡤᠣᠯᠣ ᠪᡝ ᡩᠠᠰᠠᡵᠠ ᠵᡠᡵᡤᠠᠨ, Möllendorff: Tulergi golo be dasara jurgan, Abkai: Tulergi golo be dasara jurgan) unique to the Qing government. This institution was established to supervise the administration of Tibet and the Mongol lands. As the empire expanded, it took over administrative responsibility of all minority ethnic groups living in and around the empire, including early contacts with Russia – then seen as a tribute nation. The office had the status of a full ministry and was headed by officials of equal rank. However, appointees were at first restricted only to candidates of Manchu and Mongol ethnicity, until later open to Han Chinese as well.

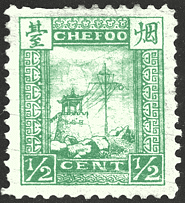
A postage stamp from Yantai (Chefoo) in the Qing dynasty

Even though the Board of Rites and Lifan Yuan performed some duties of a foreign office, they fell short of developing into a professional foreign service. It was not until 1861 – a year after losing the Second Opium War to the Anglo-French coalition – that the Qing government bowed to foreign pressure and created a proper foreign affairs office known as the Zongli Yamen. The office was originally intended to be temporary and was staffed by officials seconded from the Grand Council. However, as dealings with foreigners became increasingly complicated and frequent, the office grew in size and importance, aided by revenue from customs duties which came under its direct jurisdiction.

There was also another government institution called Imperial Household Department which was unique to the Qing dynasty. It was established before the fall of the Ming, but it became mature only after 1661, following the death of the Shunzhi Emperor and the accession of his son, the Kangxi Emperor. The department's original purpose was to manage the internal affairs of the imperial family and the activities of the inner palace (in which tasks it largely replaced eunuchs). Additionally, it also played an important role in managing the relations between the imperial court and the regions of Tibet and Mongolia, both of which were under Qing rule; engaged in trading activities (jade, ginseng, salt, furs, etc.); managed textile factories in the Jiangnan region; and even published books. Relations with the Salt Superintendents and salt merchants, such as those at Yangzhou, were particularly lucrative, especially since they were direct, and did not go through absorptive layers of bureaucracy. The department was manned by booi, (Note: Chinese: 包衣; pinyin: bāoyī; Manchu: ᠪᠣᡠ᠋ᡳ, Möllendorff: booi, Abkai: boui) or "bondservants," from the Upper Three Banners. By the 19th century, it managed the activities of at least 56 subagencies.

== Administrative divisions ==
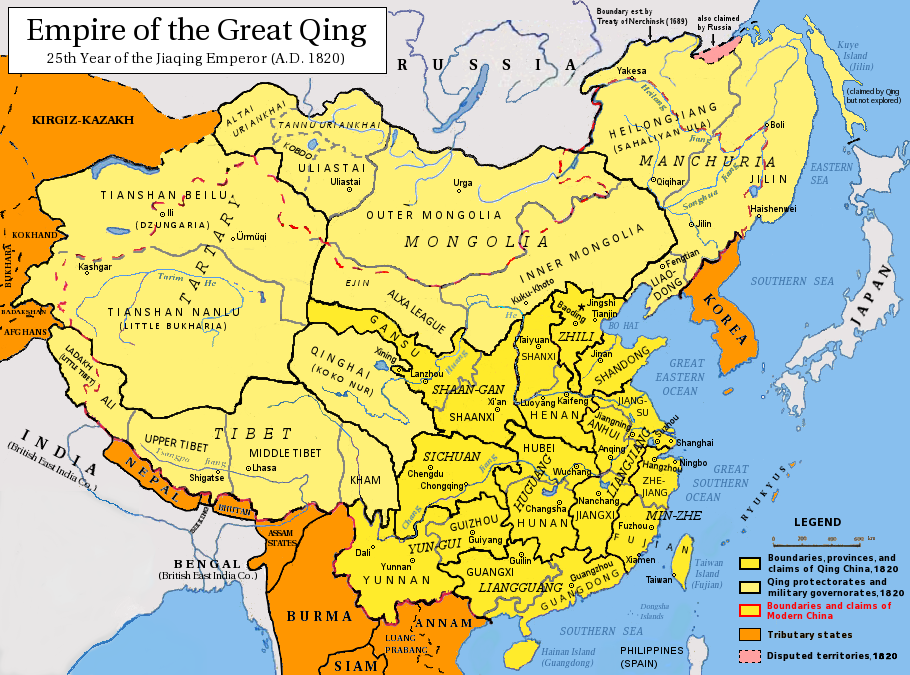
The Qing dynasty in ca. 1820, with provinces in yellow, military governorates and protectorates in light yellow, tributary states in orange

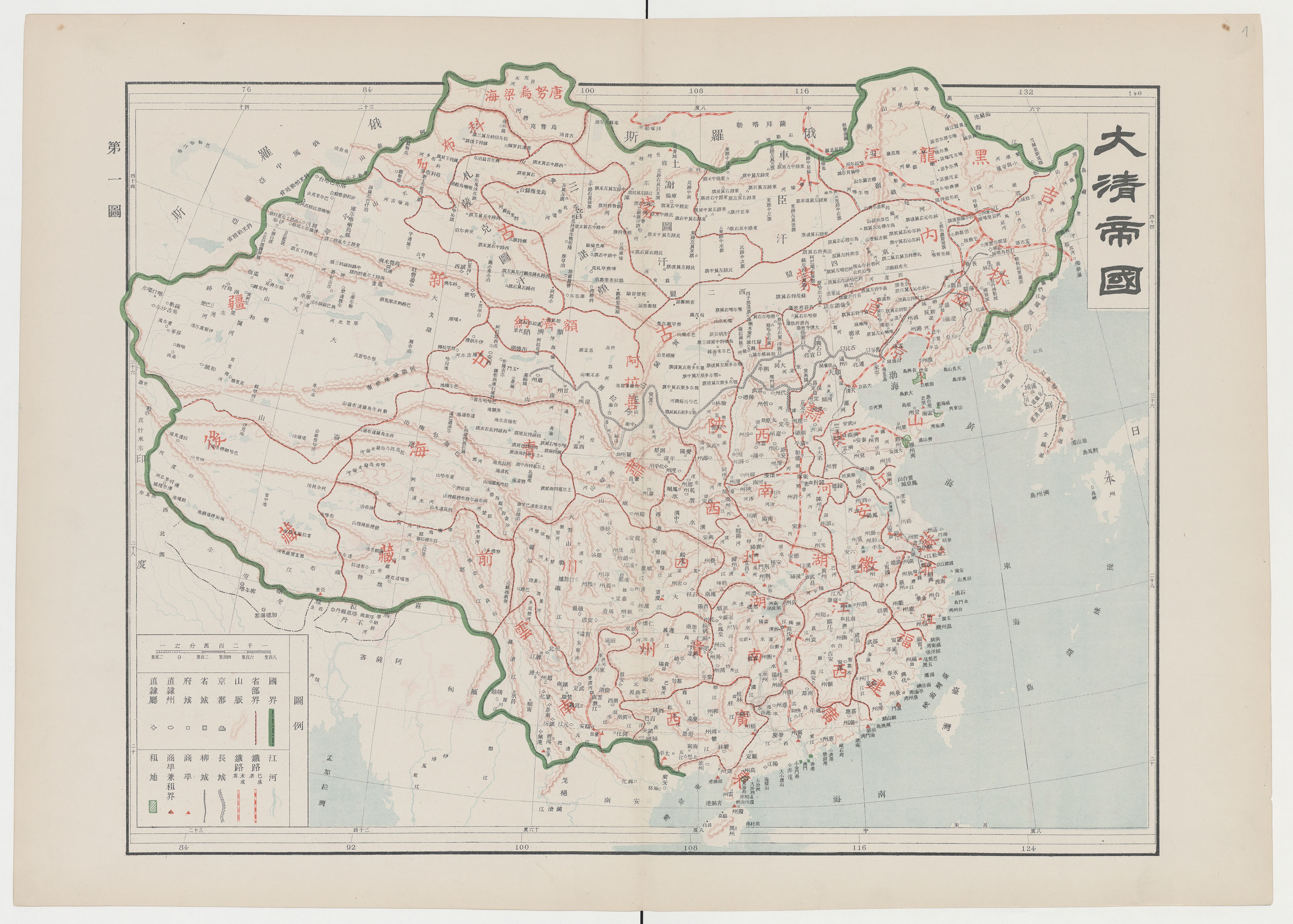
Official map of the empire published by the Qing dynasty in 1905.

Qing China reached its largest territorial extent during the 18th century, when it ruled over China proper (Eighteen Provinces), Manchuria (Northeast China and Outer Manchuria), Mongolia (Inner Mongolia and Outer Mongolia), Xinjiang, Taiwan, and Tibet, at approximately 13 million km^{2} in size. There were originally 18 provinces, all of which in China proper, but later this number was increased to 22, with Manchuria and Xinjiang being divided or turned into regular provinces. Taiwan, originally part of Fujian province, became a province of its own in the 19th century, but was ceded to the Empire of Japan following the First Sino-Japanese War by the end of the century. In addition, many surrounding countries, such as the Joseon dynasty, the Later Lê dynasty, the Tây Sơn dynasty, the Nguyễn dynasty, the Ryukyu Kingdom, and the Katoor dynasty, among many others, were tributary states of Qing China. During the Qing dynasty, the Chinese claimed suzerainty over the Taghdumbash Pamir in the south-west of Taxkorgan Tajik Autonomous County but permitted the Mir of Hunza to administer the region in return for tribute. Until 1937 the inhabitants paid tribute to the Mir of Hunza, who exercised control over the pastures. The Khanate of Kokand were forced to submit as protectorate and pay tribute to the Qing China between 1774 and 1798.

1. Northern and southern circuits of Tian Shan (later became Xinjiang province) – sometimes the small semi-autonomous Kumul Khanate and Turfan Khanate are placed into an "Eastern Circuit"
2. Outer Mongolia – Khalkha, Kobdo league, Köbsgöl, Tannu Urianha
3. Inner Mongolia – 6 leagues (Jirim, Josotu, Juu Uda, Shilingol, Ulaan Chab, Ihe Juu)
4. Other Mongolian leagues – Alshaa khoshuu (League-level khoshuu), Ejine khoshuu, Ili khoshuu (in Xinjiang), Köke Nuur league; directly ruled areas: Dariganga (Special region designated as emperor's pasture), Guihua Tümed, Chakhar, Hulunbuir
5. Tibet (Ü-Tsang and western Kham, approximately the area of present-day Tibet Autonomous Region)
6. Manchuria (Northeast China, later became provinces)
- Eighteen provinces (China proper provinces)
1. Zhili
2. Henan
3. Shandong
4. Shanxi
5. Shaanxi
6. Gansu
7. Hubei
8. Hunan
9. Guangdong
10. Guangxi
11. Sichuan
12. Yunnan
13. Guizhou
14. Jiangsu
15. Jiangxi
16. Zhejiang
17. Fujian (incl. Taiwan Prefecture until 1885)
18. Anhui
- Additional provinces in the late Qing dynasty
1. Gansu-Xinjiang
2. Fujian-Taiwan (until 1895)
3. Fengtian
4. Jilin
5. Heilongjiang

=== Provincial administration ===
There were 18 provinces in the early Qing dynasty later joined by 3 in Manchuria, Taiwan and Xinjiang. Amongst the original 18 provinces there were 8 viceroys, 18 governors, 19 finance commissioners, 18 judicial commissioners, 92 circuit-intendants, 185 prefects, 41 first-class independent sub-prefects and 72 of the second class and 1,554 magistrates. These 2,000 officials formed the Zhengyin or principal officials, the other officials were known as the accessory officials (Zuo er) who were appointed to assist the principal such as an assistant prefect. The accessory officials could carry out all the functions of the principal they were seconded to except to hear a case and listen to litigants. There were 3,138 accessory officials in the provinces.

Viceroys, governors and financial/judicial commissioners were directly appointed by the emperor with lower ranks either recommended to the emperor, sent by the Board of Civil appointments or appointed directly by the provincial authorities above them. A viceroy would hold many ranks ex-officio such as junior censor-general and minister of war with a governor being a junior associate censor-general and vice-minister of war. The viceroys of Zhili and Liangjiang were also ministers of Beiyang and Nanyang, respectively. The reason for the consolidation of titles was to give the viceroys and governors the necessary powers to consolidate necessary authority in one man and to allow for general co-ordination to occur the appointment as minister allowed them to bypass official regulation and directly address the emperor, their status as a censor-general allowed them to report on conditions outside of their domain something they could not do without being a censor. Theoretically, a viceroy was half a rank above the governor but with many viceroys and governors residing within the same city struggles between them were common for influence and control and often one would be transferred elsewhere this system of joint residence was a part of the inherent checks and balances placed within the administration by the Qing dynasty as those residing within the same city needed to present joint signatures on documents and often where both resided within the same city one would be Manchu and the other Chinese. However, as the dynasty progressed many viceroys became concurrent governors of the city they resided within.

Viceroys and governors increasingly attempted to centralise their powers and reduce Central Government oversight towards the end of the dynasty though they still remained easily dismissable according to the Imperial will even Li Hongzhang the most powerful viceroy and viceroy of Zhili the region most immediate to the capital was dismissed following his failure in the First Sino-Japanese war. It was also common for officials to be rotated every three years as per the law of avoidance to avoid regional ties between officials and the regions they governed.

=== Territorial administration ===
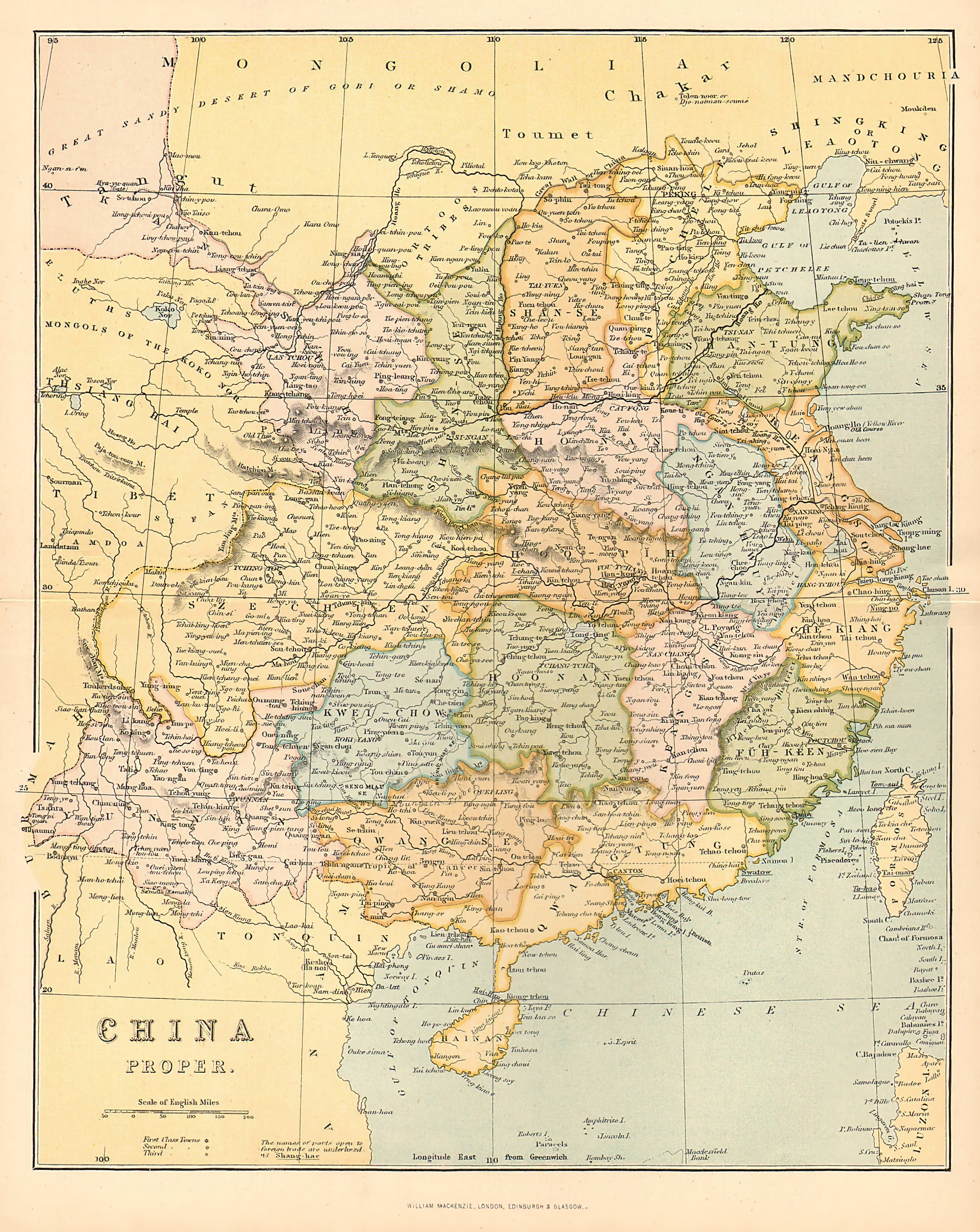
The Eighteen Provinces of China proper in 1875 – the core territories of China, inside the Great Wall of China, controlled by the majority of China's historical dynasties.

The Qing organization of provinces was based on the fifteen administrative units set up by the Ming dynasty, later made into eighteen provinces by splitting for example, Huguang into Hubei and Hunan provinces. The provincial bureaucracy continued the Yuan and Ming practice of three parallel lines, civil, military, and censorate, or surveillance. Each province was administered by a governor (巡撫, xunfu) and a provincial military commander (提督, Provincial commander in chief). Below the province were prefectures (府, fu) operating under a prefect (知府, zhīfǔ), followed by subprefectures under a subprefect. The lowest unit was the county, overseen by a county magistrate. The eighteen provinces are also known as "China proper". The position of viceroy or governor-general (總督, zongdu) was the highest rank in the provincial administration. There were eight regional viceroys in China proper, each usually took charge of two or three provinces. The viceroy of Zhili, who was responsible for the area surrounding the capital Beijing, is usually considered as the most honorable and powerful viceroy among the eight.

1. Viceroy of Zhili – in charge of Zhili
2. Viceroy of Shaan-Gan – in charge of Shaanxi and Gansu
3. Viceroy of Liangjiang – in charge of Jiangsu, Jiangxi, and Anhui
4. Viceroy of Huguang – in charge of Hubei and Hunan
5. Viceroy of Sichuan – in charge of Sichuan
6. Viceroy of Min-Zhe – in charge of Fujian, Taiwan, and Zhejiang
7. Viceroy of Liangguang – in charge of Guangdong and Guangxi
8. Viceroy of Yun-Gui – in charge of Yunnan and Guizhou

By the mid-18th century, the Qing had successfully put outer regions such as Inner and Outer Mongolia, Tibet and Xinjiang under its control. Imperial commissioners and garrisons were sent to Mongolia and Tibet to oversee their affairs. These territories were also under supervision of a central government institution called Lifan Yuan. Qinghai was also put under direct control of the Qing court. Xinjiang, also known as Chinese Turkestan, was subdivided into the regions north and south of the Tian Shan mountains, also known today as Dzungaria and Tarim Basin respectively, but the post of Ili General was established in 1762 to exercise unified military and administrative jurisdiction over both regions. Dzungaria was fully opened to Han migration by the Qianlong Emperor from the beginning. Han migrants were at first forbidden from permanently settling in the Tarim Basin but were the ban was lifted after the invasion by Jahangir Khoja in the 1820s. Likewise, Manchuria was also governed by military generals until its division into provinces, though some areas of Xinjiang and Northeast China were lost to the Russian Empire in the mid-19th century. Manchuria was originally separated from China proper by the Inner Willow Palisade, a ditch and embankment planted with willows intended to restrict the movement of the Han Chinese, as the area was off-limits to civilian Han Chinese until the government started colonizing the area, especially since the 1860s.

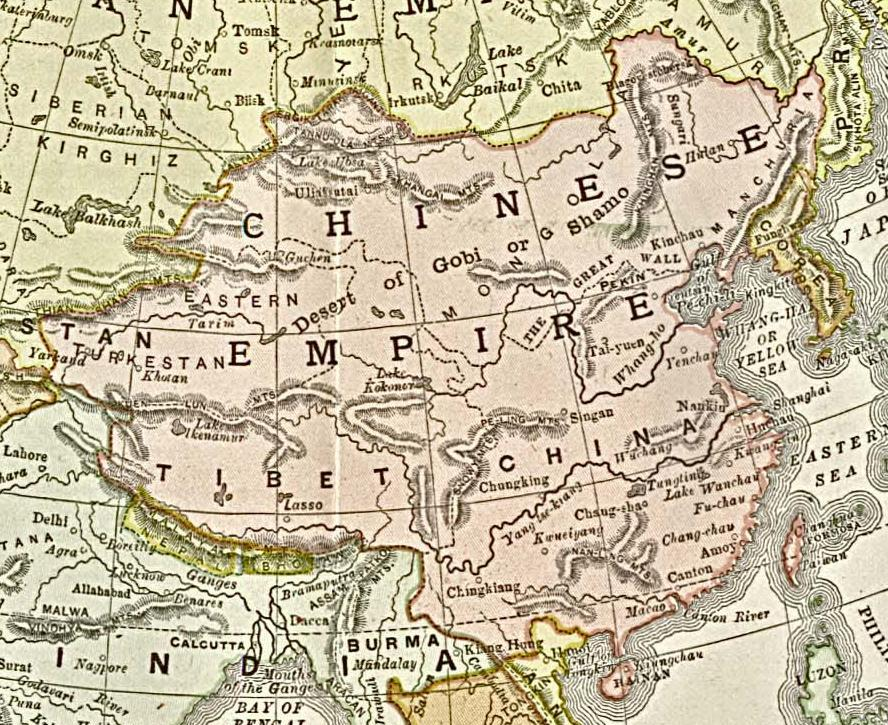
Qing China in 1892

With respect to these outer regions, the Qing maintained imperial control, with the emperor acting as Mongol khan, patron of Tibetan Buddhism and protector of Muslims. However, Qing policy changed with the establishment of Xinjiang province in 1884. During The Great Game era, taking advantage of the Dungan Revolt in northwest China, Yaqub Beg invaded Xinjiang from Central Asia and made himself the ruler of the kingdom of Kashgaria. The Qing court sent forces to defeat Yaqub Beg and Xinjiang was reconquered, and then the political system of China proper was formally applied onto Xinjiang. The Kumul Khanate, which was incorporated into the Qing empire as a vassal after helping Qing defeat the Zunghars in 1757, maintained its status after Xinjiang turned into a province through the end of the dynasty in the Xinhai Revolution up until 1930. In 1904, the British expedition to Tibet resulted in the Tibetans signing the Convention of Lhasa with Britain. The Qing court responded by asserting Chinese sovereignty over Tibet, resulting in the 1906 Anglo-Chinese Convention signed between Britain and China. The British agreed not to annex Tibetan territory or to interfere in the administration of Tibet, while China engaged not to permit any other foreign state to interfere with the territory or internal administration of Tibet. Furthermore, similar to Xinjiang which was converted into a province earlier, the Qing government also turned Manchuria into three provinces in the early 20th century, officially known as the "Three Northeast Provinces", and established the post of Viceroy of the Three Northeast Provinces to oversee these provinces, making the total number of regional viceroys to nine.

Territorial Administration

Administrative Commissioner's Office (布政使司) (Provinces 省, shěng; Administrative Provinces 行省)
Circuits (道, dào)
Independent Departments (直隸州/直隶州, zhílìzhōu)	Prefectures (府, fǔ)	Independent Subprefectures (直隸廳/厅, zhílìtīng)
Counties (縣/县, xiàn)	Departments (散州, sànzhōu)	Counties (縣/县, xiàn)	Subprefectures (散廳/散厅, sàntīng)

== See also ==
- Government of the Han dynasty
- Government of the Ming dynasty
- Political systems of Imperial China
- List of diplomatic missions of the Qing dynasty
