= Five Directorates =

- Traditional Chinese: 五監
- Simplified Chinese: 五监
Transcriptions
Standard Mandarin
- Hanyu Pinyin: Wǔ Jiān

The Five Directorates were five service agencies in the central government of the Sui, Tang, and Song dynasties of China, apart from the Nine Courts.

The Five Directorates included:

- Directorate of Waterways (都水監)
- Directorate for Imperial Manufactories (少府監)
- Directorate for the Palace Buildings (将作監)
- Directorate for Armaments (軍器監)
- Directorate of Education (國子監), during the Sui and Tang dynasties
- Directorate of Astronomy (司天監), during the Five Dynasties period and Song dynasty
