= Court of Imperial Sacrifices =

- 太常寺

Agency overview
- Formed: 550 (Northern Qi dynasty)
- Dissolved: 1912 (Qing dynasty)
- Parent department: Ministry of Rites

Court of Imperial Sacrifices

Chinese name
- Chinese: 太常寺
Transcriptions
Standard Mandarin
- Hanyu Pinyin: Tàicháng Sì
- Wade–Giles: T'ai^{4}-ch'ang^{2} Ssu^{4}

Vietnamese name
- Vietnamese: Thái thường tự

The Court of Imperial Sacrifices, also known as the Court of Sacrificial Worship, was a central government agency in several imperial Chinese and Vietnamese dynasties. It was generally in charge of conducting major state sacrificial ceremonies according to ritual regulations. In China, the office was created during the Northern Qi dynasty (550–577) and continued until the Qing dynasty (1644–1912). In Vietnam, it was created by Lê Thánh Tông in 1466, and continued until the Nguyễn dynasty.

It was one of the Nine Courts and normally under the supervision of the Ministry of Rites. Prior to the Qing dynasty it was the most prestigious of the Nine Courts.

== Office of the National Altars ==
Office of the National Altars

Jiaoshe Shu
- Chinese: 郊社署
Transcriptions
Standard Mandarin
- Hanyu Pinyin: Jiāoshè Shǔ
- Wade–Giles: Chiao-shê Shu

Jiaoshe Ju
- Chinese: 郊社局
Transcriptions
Standard Mandarin
- Hanyu Pinyin: Jiāoshè Jú
- Wade–Giles: Chiao-shê Chü

Vietnamese name
- Vietnamese alphabet: Giao xã thự
- Hán-Nôm: 郊社署

The Office of the National Altars was a government agency under the Court of Imperial Sacrifices during the Sui, Tang, Song, Jurchen Jin, and Yuan dynasties. Under the Sui and Tang, it was known as Jiaoshe Shu and, under the Song and Yuan, it was known as Jiaoshe Ju. Its main function was to prepare for and participate in regular rituals at major sacrificial altars and temples in the dynastic capital.
