= Nine Courts =

- Chinese: 九寺
Transcriptions
Standard Mandarin
- Hanyu Pinyin: Jiǔ Sì
- Wade–Giles: Chiu Szu

The Nine Courts or Ministries were nine service agencies in Imperial China that existed from the Northern Qi dynasty (550–577) to the Qing dynasty (1644–1912). Headed by the Nine Ministers, the offices were subordinate to the Three Departments and Six Ministries. They were mostly ceremonial in nature and held a fair amount of power. During the Ming dynasty, the term generally referred to the Six Ministries, the Censorate, the Office of Transmission, and the Grand Court of Revision. The number of courts was not always nine throughout history.

The Nine Courts and Ministers throughout most of Chinese history were:

The Nine Courts and Ministers
Court				Minister			
English	Chinese			English	Chinese		
English	Trad.	Simp.	Pinyin	English	Trad.	Simp.	Pinyin
Court of Imperial Sacrifices	太常寺		Tàichángsì	Minister of Ceremonies	太常		Tàicháng
Court of Imperial Entertainments	光祿寺	光祿寺	Guānglùsì	Minister of Imperial Entertainments	光祿勳	光禄勋	Guānglùxūn
Court of the Imperial Clan	宗正寺		Zōngzhèngsì	Minister of the Imperial Clan	宗正		Zōngzhèng
Court of the Imperial Stud	太僕寺	太仆寺	Tàipúsì	Minister Coachman	太僕	太仆	Tàipú
Court of the Imperial Treasury	太府寺		Tàifǔsì	Minister Steward	少府		Shàofǔ
Court of the Imperial Regalia	衛尉寺	卫尉寺	Wèiwèisì	Minister of the Guards	衛尉	卫尉	Wèiwèi
Court of State Ceremonial	鴻臚寺	鸿胪寺	Hónglúsì	Minister Herald	鴻臚	鸿胪	Hónglú
Court of the National Granaries	司農寺	司农寺	Sīnóngsì	Minister of Finance	司農	司农	Sīnóng
Court of Judicature and Revision	大理寺		Dàlǐsì	Minister of Justice	大理		Dàlǐ

== See also ==
- Five Directorates
