= Court of the Imperial Stud =

Historical central government agency

Chinese name
- Traditional Chinese: 太僕寺
- Simplified Chinese: 太仆寺
- Literal meaning: Office of the Grand Groom
Transcriptions
Standard Mandarin
- Hanyu Pinyin: Tàipǔ Sì
- Wade–Giles: T'ai^{4}-p'u^{3} Ssu^{4}

Vietnamese name
- Vietnamese alphabet: Thái bộc tự
- Hán-Nôm: 太僕寺

Manchu name
- Manchu script: ᠠᡩᡠᠨ ᠪᡝ ᡴᠠᡩᠠᠯᠠᡵᠠ ᠶᠠᠮᡠᠨ
- Möllendorff: adun be kadalara yamun

The Court of the Imperial Stud, also known as the Court of the Imperial Stables, was a central government agency in several imperial Chinese and Vietnamese dynasties. It was generally in charge of managing state horse pasturage, stables, and corrals, as well as maintaining the vehicles for use by the imperial household and members of the central government. In China, the office was created during the Northern Qi dynasty (550–577) and continued until the Qing dynasty (1644–1912). In Vietnam, it was created by Lê Thánh Tông in 1466, and continued until the Nguyễn dynasty.

It was one of the Nine Courts. During the Song dynasty, the agency also contained offices in charge of elephants and camels.
