= Xu Chengyu =

Xu Chengyu 徐承煜

Senior Deputy Minister of Justice
- In office 16 November 1898 – 13 February 1901 Serving with Akdan (until 1899), Puting (1899), Chongxun (since 1899)
- Preceded by: Li Peiyuan
- Succeeded by: Xue Yunsheng

Senior Deputy Minister of Rites
- In office 30 July – 12 November 1900 (acting) Serving with Ronghui
- Preceded by: Zhang Baixi
- Succeeded by: Li Fuzao
- In office 9 October – 16 November 1898 (acting) Serving with Kuoputongwu
- Preceded by: Wang Xifan (acting)
- Succeeded by: Ge Baohua (acting)

Minister of Court of Imperial Sacrifices
- In office 15 September 1896 – 1897 Serving with Qingfu
- Preceded by: Kung Chao-Yuan
- Succeeded by: Chen Bangrui

Minister of Court of the Imperial Stud
- In office 10 January – 15 September 1896 Serving with Song'an
- Preceded by: Yang Yü
- Succeeded by: Liu Enpu

Personal details
- Born: 1838
- Died: 26 February 1901 (aged 62–63) Caishikou Execution Grounds, Beijing, Qing Empire
- Parent: Xu Tong (father)
- Education: Imperial Academy
- Occupation: politician
- Courtesy name: Nanshi (楠士)

Military service
- Allegiance: Qing dynasty
- Branch/service: Han Chinese Plain Blue Banner
- Battles/wars: Boxer Rebellion

Xu Chengyu (Chinese: 徐承煜, 1838–1901), courtesy name Nanshi (楠士), was a Qing dynasty official from the Han Chinese Plain Blue Banner. He was a son of Xu Tong.

Xu Chengyu obtained the xiucai (秀才) degree in the imperial examination and was selected a gongsheng (貢生) of the Imperial Academy in 1861. He had served as director of the Ministry of Revenue Shaanxi Bureau (戶部陝西司郎中), staff of Huiling Mausoleum construction office (惠陵工程處隨同辦事), Minister of the Court of the Imperial Stud (太僕寺卿), Assistant Commissioner of Transmission (通政使司參議), associate director of the Court of the Imperial Clan (宗人府府丞) and other positions. He was promoted to the Senior Deputy Minister of Justice (刑部左侍郎) in 1898.

Like his father, Xu Chengyu stood in the way of Hundred Days' Reform. Although he was hostile to Western culture, he was quite accepting of Western things in terms of material life enjoyment. It was said that he bought Western-style furniture and smoked cigars, for which he was scolded by his father. During the Boxer Rebellion, Xu Chengyu supported to use the Boxers to fight against Western countries. He was appointed the execution witness (監斬官) of Xu Yongyi, Lishan, Xu Jingcheng, Lianyuan and Yuan Chang. When Beijing fell to the Eight-Nation Alliance in 1900, Xu Chengyu persuaded his father to commit suicide with him. However, after Xu Tong committed suicide, he regretted it. He buried his father's body in the backyard and tried to fled from the capital however, was captured by Japanese soldiers. In the next year, the victorious Eight-Nation Alliance named him as one of the masterminds behind the rebellion and demanded that he be executed. Zhang Zhidong suggested to the Empress Dowager Cixi that Xu Chengyu should be returned to the Qing court for trial, and then force him commit suicide. Xu Chengyu was dismissed from all official positions and later, executed at the Caishikou Execution Grounds together with Qixiu on 26 February 1901. Xu Chengyu was so frightened that he fainted and fell unconscious during the execution. Unlike him, Qixiu accepted the fate very calmly.
