= Yulu (viceroy) =

Chinese viceroy

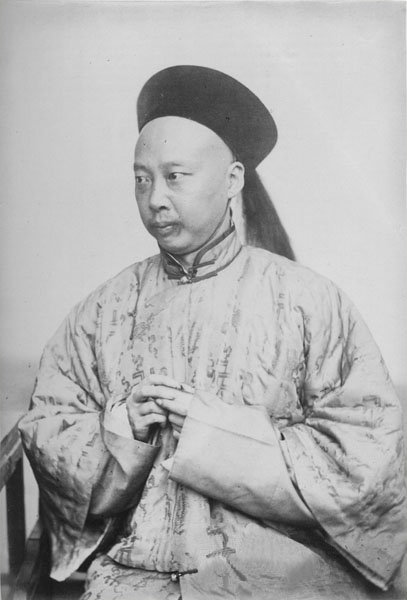

Grand Councilor
- In office 1898

Viceroy of Zhili
- In office 28 September 1898 – 27 July 1900
- Preceded by: Ronglu
- Succeeded by: Li Hongzhang

Minister of Rites
- In office 7 September – 28 September 1898 Serving with Li Duanfen
- Preceded by: Hūwaitabu
- Succeeded by: Qixiu

Minister of Zongli Yamen
- In office 7 September – 28 September 1898

Viceroy of Sichuan
- In office 11 December 1897 – 11 July 1898
- Preceded by: Li Bingheng
- Succeeded by: Kuijun

General of Mukden
- In office 1889–1895
- Preceded by: Qingyu
- Succeeded by: Iktangga

Viceroy of Huguang (acting)
- In office April 1885 – August 1889
- Preceded by: Bian Baodi (acting)
- Succeeded by: Zhang Zhidong

Viceroy of Sichuan (acting)
- In office 6 September – October 1887
- Preceded by: Zeng Guoquan (acting)
- Succeeded by: Zeng Guoquan (acting)
- In office 8 February – 16 February 1884
- Preceded by: Zuo Zongtang
- Succeeded by: Zeng Guoquan (acting)

Governor of Anhui
- In office 1874–1884
- Preceded by: Wu Yuanbing
- Succeeded by: Lu Shijie (acting)

Personal details
- Born: 1844
- Died: 1900 (aged 55–56) Yangcun, Tianjin, Zhili, China
- Parent: Chonglun (father)

Chinese name
- Traditional Chinese: 裕祿
- Simplified Chinese: 裕禄
Transcriptions
Standard Mandarin
- Hanyu Pinyin: Yùlù
- Wade–Giles: Yü-lu

Manchu name
- Manchu script: ᡞᠣᡞᠯᡠ
- Romanization: ioilu

Yulu (Chinese: 裕祿, Manchu: ᡞᠣᡞᠯᡠ, 1844–1900), of the Hitara clan with the courtesy names Shoushan (壽山) and Zifu (子茀), was a native of the Manchu Plain Blue Banner and son of Chonglun, the governor of Hubei. He once served as the inspector-general of Anhui, Viceroy of Liangjiang, governor of Anhui, Viceroy of Huguang, general of Shengjing, and governor of Sichuan. In 1898, he was awarded the title of grand minister of state, minister of rites, grand minister of the Zongli Yamen. Later he served as Viceroy of Zhili.

== Life ==
A boy named Li Liu was the son of a rebel named Li Mao-tz'e (Li Maozi) who rebelled on the border of Henan (Honan) and Anhui (Anhwei) provinces in 1872. Li Liu was captured when he was 6 years old by Qing government forces in Anhui (Anhwei) and handed over to Yulu (Yu Luh), the governor of Anhui. He was imprisoned in the office of the district magistrate of Huaining (Hwaining) until he reached 11 years old in 1877 and was then ordered to be handed to the Imperial Household Department for castration. His case appeared on 28 November 1877 in the Peking Gazette.

In 1900, when the Boxer Rebellion expanded from Shandong to Zhili, Yulu sent troops to encircle and suppress it, adopting the method of "executing everyone regardless of their leader". At that time, there was a folk song among the people: "When you encounter Mei Dongyi, every family has no food to eat; "With Fan Tiangui, every family is a master." Mei Dongyi and Fan Tiangui were both officers of the Qing Army under the direct control of the Qing dynasty. Under Yulu's suppression, the Boxers continued to suppress more and more people, and Qing army deputy general Yang Futong was attacked and killed by the group members. The Boxers were supported by conservative officials Prince of Duan Zaiyi, Gangyi, Zhao Shuqiao and others in Beijing. They entered Beijing to attack foreigners in churches. This led to the ministers of various countries asking Seymour, the commander of the British army in Tianjin, to lead a coalition of various countries to Beijing to protect the embassy. On the one hand, it requires all countries to send more troops to China.

It is remembered that Huanglien Shengmu garnered respect for the Red Lanterns after a confrontation with Zhili Governor-General Yulu. Yulu was resistant to Boxer intervention against foreigners. After resisting Boxer efforts even when fighting had already begun in Tianjin, Huanglien Shengmu confronted him. She argued for his support and condemned him for his opposition to the Boxers. In a triumphant success, he conceded to the Boxers and promised his future support to the Rebellion. Historian Paul Cohen notes that Huanglien Shengmu's confrontation is significant because she was both a working-class person talking up to a ruling-class person, and also a female in a highly patriarchal society talking down to a male with unusual success.

On June 17, the coalition forces attacked the Dagu Fort, and the fort guard Luo Rongguang fired back. On June 18, Dong Fuxiang's Gansu Army and Seymour's Army fought fiercely in Langfang. Seymour's Army retreated to Tianjin, and the war actually broke out. On June 19, Empress Dowager Cixi ordered Yulu: "Foreign soldiers from various countries want to occupy the Dagu Fort. The situation is urgent and the war has begun. The governor must urgently recruit volunteers, consolidate the people's hearts, and help the officers and soldiers defend and resist. Don't be afraid to look around and let foreign soldiers come in."

Starting from June 17, Yulu commanded the front army of Nie Shicheng's armed guards and the left army of Ma Yukun 's armed guards to besiege the Tianjin concession area, intending to put pressure on the Western powers and force them to withdraw their troops. On June 27, Dagu reinforcements and Seymour's army gathered in the Tianjin Concession and turned from defense to offense. On July 9,Nie Shicheng was killed in action. On July 13, Yulu and Ma Yukun were defeated and fled to Beicang. On the 14th, Tianjin fell. They fled in early August. He went to Yangcun and committed suicide by taking poison.

Manchu banner garrisons were annihilated on 5 roads by Russians as they suffered most of the casualties. Manchu Shoufu killed himself during the battle of Peking and the Manchu Lao She's father was killed by western soldiers in the battle as the Manchu banner armies of the Center Division of the Guards Army, Tiger Spirit Division and Peking Field Force in the Metropolitan banners were slaughtered by the western soldiers. Baron von Ketteler, the German diplomat was murdered by Captain Enhai, a Manchu from the Tiger Spirit Division of Aisin Gioro Zaiyi, Prince Duan and the Inner city Legation Quarters and Catholic cathedral (Church of the Saviour, Beijing) were both attacked by Manchu bannermen. Manchu bannermen were slaughtered by the Eight Nation Alliance all over Manchuria and Beijing because most of the Manchu bannermen supported the Boxers in the Boxer rebellion. There were 1,266 households including 900 Daurs and 4,500 Manchus in Sixty-Four Villages East of the River and Blagoveshchensk until the Blagoveshchensk massacre and Sixty-Four Villages East of the River massacre committed by Russian Cossack soldiers. Many Manchu villages were burned by Cossacks in the massacre according to Victor Zatsepine.

Western and Japanese soldiers mass raped Manchu women and Mongol banner women in the Tartar Banner inner city of Beijing in siheyuan hutongs in the city. Sawara Tokusuke, a Japanese journalist wrote in "Miscellaneous Notes about the Boxers," about the rapes of Manchu and Mongol banner girls like when Manchu bannerman Yulu was killed in Yangcun and his seven daughters gang raped in the Heavenly palace. A daughter and wife of Mongol banner noble Chongqi of the Alute clan were gang raped. Multiple relatives including his son Baochu killed themselves after he killed himself on 26 August 1900. (Fang 75).

Manchu royals, officials and officers like Yuxian, Qixiu, Zaixun, Prince Zhuang and Captain Enhai (En Hai) were executed or forced to commit suicide by the Eight Nation Alliance. Manchu official Gangyi's execution was demanded but he already died. Japanese soldiers arrested Qixiu before he was executed. Zaixun, Prince Zhuang was forced to commit suicide on 21 February 1901. They executed Yuxian on 22 February 1901. On 31 December 1900 German soldiers beheaded the Manchu captain Enhai for killing Clemens von Ketteler. Posthumous dishonour was conferred upon Gangyi.

== Family ==
- His father was Chonglun, the governor of Hubei Province.
- His wife was from the Hešeri family. Her father is Longshan from the Manchu bordered blue banner. His uncle Daoguang was a Jinshi in the 18th year of the Reform Movement of 1898. Her aunt was a concubine of the Daoguang emperor.
- Eldest son Xichen
- The second son, Xiyuan w:zh:熙元, was a Jinshi in the Jichou year of Guangxu. He became a Shujishi in 1889. Xiyuan and his family, wife and sister in law committed suicide in Beijing in 1900 after the Eight Nation Alliance took over the city.
- The third son, Xiyan, was a Jinshi in the Renchen year of Guangxu.
- The fourth son is Xizheng; his wife is Wanyan; his father is Songshen, a Jinshi of Wuchen year of Tongzhi, in the Imperial Household Department's Manchu Bordered Yellow Banner
- Xirui (mourn)
- Xiwen
- Xifu
- The ninth son, Xijun, was the heir his brother Yuhui from the Yulu clan. He succeeded the Duke Chengen of Queen Xiao Shurui's Xitala clan and married the fourth daughter of Prince Qing Yikuang. He died in the 26th year of Guangxu's reign (1900).
- A daughter of the Hitara family married Niohuru Enhao. His father was the imperial guard and General Guangke of Hangzhou. His aunt Niohuru was the filial Empress Zhenxian (Empress Dowager Ci'an) of Emperor Xianfeng. His grandfather was Muyanga.

== Gallery ==
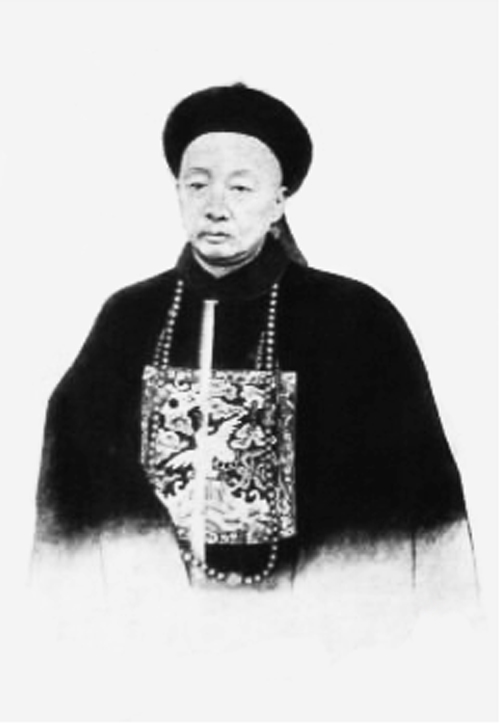
Yulu, a Governor of Anhui

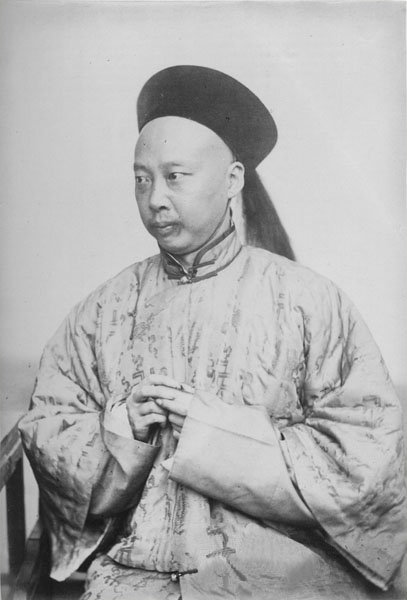
A photograph of Yulu

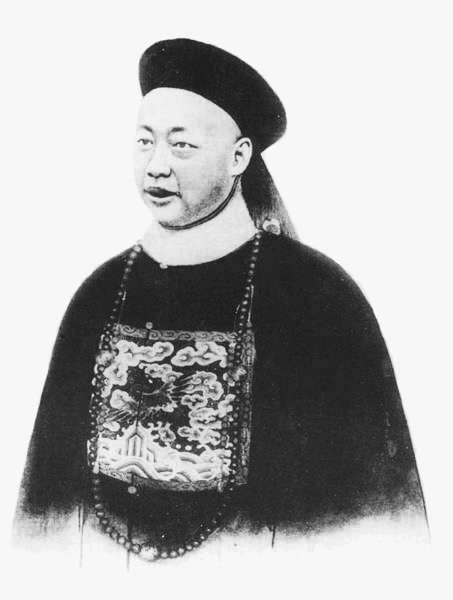
Xiyuan, Yulu's son and professor in Hanlin Academy

Government offices
Preceded by Wu Yuanbing	Governor of Anhui; 1874–1884	Succeeded by Lu Shijie
Preceded by Zuo Zongtang	Viceroy of Liangguang; 1884	Succeeded by Zeng Guoquan
Preceded by Bian Baodi	Viceroy of Huguang; 1885–1889	Succeeded by Zhang Zhidong
Preceded by Qingyu	General of Mukden; 1889–1895	Succeeded by Iktangga
Preceded by Li Bingheng	Viceroy of Sichuan; 1897–1898	Succeeded by Kuijun
Preceded by Waitabu	Minister of Rites; 1898	Succeeded by Qixiu
Preceded by Ronglu	Viceroy of Zhili; 1898–1900	Succeeded by Li Hongzhang
