= Qixiu =

Qing dynasty politician (1839–1901)

Grand Councillor
- In office 17 December 1898 – 13 February 1901

Minister of Zongli Yamen
- In office 10 June 1900 – 13 February 1901

Minister of Rites
- In office 29 September 1898 – 13 February 1901 Serving with Li Duanfen (until 1898), Liao Shouheng (1900), Lu Chuanlin (1900), Sun Jianai (since 1900)
- Preceded by: Yulu
- Succeeded by: Shixu

Minister of Lifan Yuan
- In office 20 September 1894 – 29 September 1898
- Preceded by: Chongli
- Succeeded by: Yude

Deputy Minister of War of Mukden
- In office 7 October 1892 – 20 September 1894
- Preceded by: Fenglie
- Succeeded by: Shouyin

Deputy Minister of Revenue of Mukden
- In office 8 July 1882 – 22 April 1888
- Preceded by: Enfu
- Succeeded by: Mianyi

Deputy Minister of Justice of Mukden
- In office 19 July 1879 – 18 September 1881
- Preceded by: Jige (acting)
- Succeeded by: Baosen

Personal details
- Born: 1839
- Died: 26 February 1901 (aged 61–62) Caishikou Execution Grounds, Beijing, Qing Empire
- Education: Jinshi degree in the Imperial Examination (1865)
- Occupation: politician
- Clan name: Kūyala (庫雅拉)
- Courtesy name: Yingzhi (穎芝)

Military service
- Allegiance: Qing dynasty
- Branch/service: Manchu Plain White Banner
- Battles/wars: Boxer Rebellion

Qixiu (Chinese: 啟秀, 1839–1901), from the Kūyala clan (庫雅拉氏) with the courtesy name Yingzhi (穎芝), was a Manchu politician of the late Qing dynasty. He was a member of the Manchu Plain White Banner.

Qixiu obtained the highest degree (jinshi) in the imperial examination and was selected a shujishi of the Hanlin Academy in 1865. He had served as the literary official of the Ministry of Justice (刑部主事), Secretary of Cabinet (內閣學士), Junior Deputy Minister of Justice (刑部右侍郎), Senior Deputy Minister of Rites (禮部左侍郎), Minister of Lifan Yuan (理藩院尚書) and other positions. He was appointed the Minister of Rites and Grand Councilor in 1898.

During the Boxer Rebellion, Prince Duan led attacks against the Christians in the Church of the Saviour, Beijing. It was said that Qixiu wrote a letter to an old monk in Wutai Mountain, inviting him to attack the church. The monk claimed that Guan Yu had descended into his spirit and possessed him; he rode on Prince Zhuang's horse, holding a broadsword, and led the Boxers to set fire near the church. The monk was shot and fell off his horse, and the Boxers dispersed.

On 14 August 1900, Empress Dowager Cixi, Guangxu Emperor and some other court officials fled from the capital as the Eight-Nation Alliance marched on Beijing. Qixiu's mother was ill, he decided to stay in the capital. He was captured by Japanese soldiers. In the next year, the victorious Eight-Nation Alliance named him as one of the masterminds behind the rebellion. He was dismissed from all official positions and later, executed at the Caishikou Execution Grounds together with Xu Chengyu on 26 February 1901.
