= Li Hongzao =

Chinese government official

Imperial tutor Li Hongzao
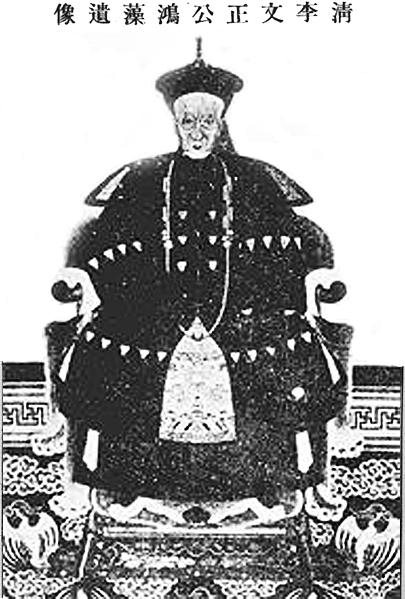

Grand Councillor
- In office 3 November 1894 – 31 July 1897

Assistant Grand Secretary
- In office 2 December 1896 – 31 July 1897

Minister of Zongli Yamen
- In office 6 August 1895 – 31 July 1897

Minister of Personnel
- In office 3 December 1896 – 31 July 1897 Serving with Xijing
- Preceded by: Xu Tong
- Succeeded by: Sun Jianai
- In office 13 March 1882 – 8 April 1884 Serving with Gengshou
- Preceded by: Wan Qingli
- Succeeded by: Xu Tong

Minister of War
- In office 1 February 1881 – 13 March 1882 Serving with Gengshou (until 1881), Zhihe (since 1881)
- Preceded by: Shen Guifen
- Succeeded by: Mao Changxi

Personal details
- Born: 1820 Gaoyang County, Zhili
- Died: 31 July 1897 (aged 76–77) Beijing
- Education: Jinshi degree in the Imperial Examination (1852)
- Courtesy name: Lansun (蘭孫)
- Art name: Shisun (石孫)
- Posthumous name: Wenzheng (文正)

Li Hongzao (Chinese: 李鴻藻; 1820–31 July 1897), styled Lansun (蘭孫), pseudonym Shisun (石孫), was a high government official towards the end of the Qing dynasty. One of his sons was Li Shizeng, a prominent politician in the Chinese Nationalist Party.

== Official career ==
Li was born in Gaoyang County, Zhili, in present-day Hebei province. In 1861, the two dowagers empresses chose Li Hongzao, Qi Junzao, and Weng Xincun, who were all Imperial teachers, to instruct the newly enthroned Tongzhi Emperor in the classics. The Emperor, who was less than five years old at the time, displayed little or no interest in his studies, and would concentrate only when Li was instructing him. Li rose to be vice-president of the Board of Revenue and Grand Councilor, and in 1872 became head of the Board of Works. He then retired for a three-year period, 1877-1880, as required by custom and statute at the death of his mother.

Upon his return to office, he resumed his post with the Grand Council and the Zongli Yamen, which was in effect the dynasty's Ministry of Foreign Affairs. In 1884, Li and all the Grand Councillors, such as Yixin, who had been supported by the Empress Dowager, Cixi, were dismissed in a dispute with a group of conservative officials. He was gradually given permission to resume responsibilities, but often criticized for not carrying them out promptly. After the outbreak of the First Sino-Japanese War in 1894, he was given even greater duties, but died in 1897.

== Family ==
He was the father of Li Shizeng.
