= Sun Jianai =

Qing dynasty official (1827–1909)

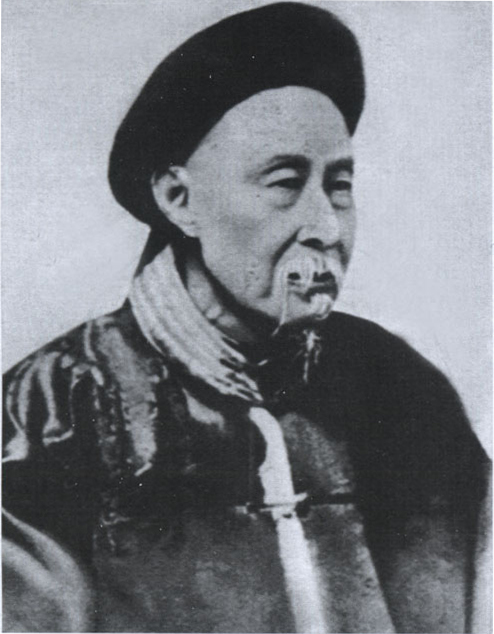
- Sun, early 1900s

Minister of the Imperial University of Beijing
- In office 3 July 1898 – 3 December 1899 (1 year, 153 days)
- Preceded by: Office established
- Succeeded by: Xu Jingcheng

Personal details
- Born: 7 April 1827 Suzhou, Anhui, Qing China
- Died: 29 November 1909 (aged 82) Beijing, Zhili, Qing China

Chinese name
- Traditional Chinese: 孫家鼐
- Simplified Chinese: 孙家鼐
Transcriptions
Standard Mandarin
- Hanyu Pinyin: Sūn Jiānài
- Wade–Giles: Sun^{1} Chia^{1}-nai^{4}

Courtesy name
- Chinese: 燮臣
Transcriptions
Standard Mandarin
- Hanyu Pinyin: Xièchén
- Wade–Giles: Hsieh^{4}-ch`en^{2}

Posthumous name
- Chinese: 文正
Transcriptions
Standard Mandarin
- Hanyu Pinyin: Wénzhèng
- Wade–Giles: Wen^{2}-cheng^{4}

Sun Jianai (7 April 1827 – 29 November 1909) was a Chinese official and educator during the late Qing dynasty, noted as an advisor and tutor to the Guangxu Emperor. Born in Anhui, he passed the imperial examinations and became a jinshi in 1859. After service as an education director in Hubei and at the Palace School for Princes, he was appointed as the tutor of the young Guangxu Emperor alongside Weng Tonghe. He served in various administrative posts during the 1880s and 1890s, including as president of the Censorate, Ministry of Works, Ministry of Rites, and Ministry of Civil Appointments. He was an advocate for the creation of what would become the Imperial University of Peking. Emperor Guangxu appointed Sun the Director of Educational Affairs and the imperial minister of the university. During the Hundred Days' Reform, he managed the university's opening and served as one of the emperor's closest advisors during the period.

A political moderate, Sun survived Empress Dowager Cixi's coup against the reform movement, and continued to manage the university. During the Boxer Rebellion, the university was destroyed and Sun's house was looted by the Kansu Braves. Following Cixi, he fled to Xi'an. After the war, he was promoted to the post of Grand Secretary of the Tiran Ge, and served as an examiner for the metropolitan imperial exams. He returned to managing the university in a triad with Zhang Baixi and Rongqing in 1904. He was named the prospective chairman of the advisory National Assembly, but died before the body could convene.

== Early career ==
Sun Jinai was born in Suzhou, Anhui, Qing China on 7 April 1827. Passing the imperial examinations, a prerequisite for service in the state bureaucracy, he became a juren in 1851, and a jinshi in 1859 after study at the Hanlin Academy. He served for some time as a director of education in Hubei, and was appointed as a tutor at the Palace School for Princes (上书房行走) in 1868. From 1878 to 1888, Sun served as the personal tutor of the young Guangxu Emperor, alongside the preeminent Weng Tonghe. Shortly into their service, both tutors upset conservative Manchu officials after recommending that the 17th century Ming loyalists Huang Zongxi and Gu Yanwu be enshrined at the Beijing Temple of Confucius. (Note: The Manchu-led Qing dynasty conquered the Han Chinese Ming dynasty during the 17th century, although loyalist activities continued afterwards.) However, due to his moderate political leanings, Sun was able to maintain the favor of Empress Dowager Cixi.

Sun served as the vice president of various ministries, some concurrently to his tutoring service; he was the vice president of the Ministry of Works from 1879 to 1883, the Ministry of Revenue from 1883 to 1887, the Ministry of War from 1887 to 1889, and the Ministry of Civil Appointments from 1889 to 1890. He became president of the Censorate in 1890; two years later he was jointly appointed as the president of the Ministry of Works and the governor of Beijing, a post he would hold until 1899. Alongside the general and statesman Li Hongzhang, Sun opposed Weng's advocacy of war against Japan over Korea, believing that China would be unable to defeat the Japanese. Weng's faction was able to push Emperor Guangxu to support the conflict, leading to the First Sino-Japanese War and China's defeat in 1895. After the war, Sun was appointed to establish a state printing office. He served as the president of the Ministry of Rites in 1896–1897 and the Ministry of Civil Appointments in 1897–1899.

In 1895, a group of intellectuals led by Wen Tingshi organized a study society dubbed the Qiangxuehui (強學會; 'Society for the Study of Self-Strengthening'). On the urging of censor Yang Chongyi, Emperor Guangxu banned the society the following year. Sun approached Guangxu and spoke in favor of the society, echoing Li Hongzhang's proposal that the emperor to fund the establishment of a book depot to house the society's library. In response, the Emperor declared Sun the superintendent of the Official Book Depot to maintain the library.

== The Hundred Days and the Imperial University ==
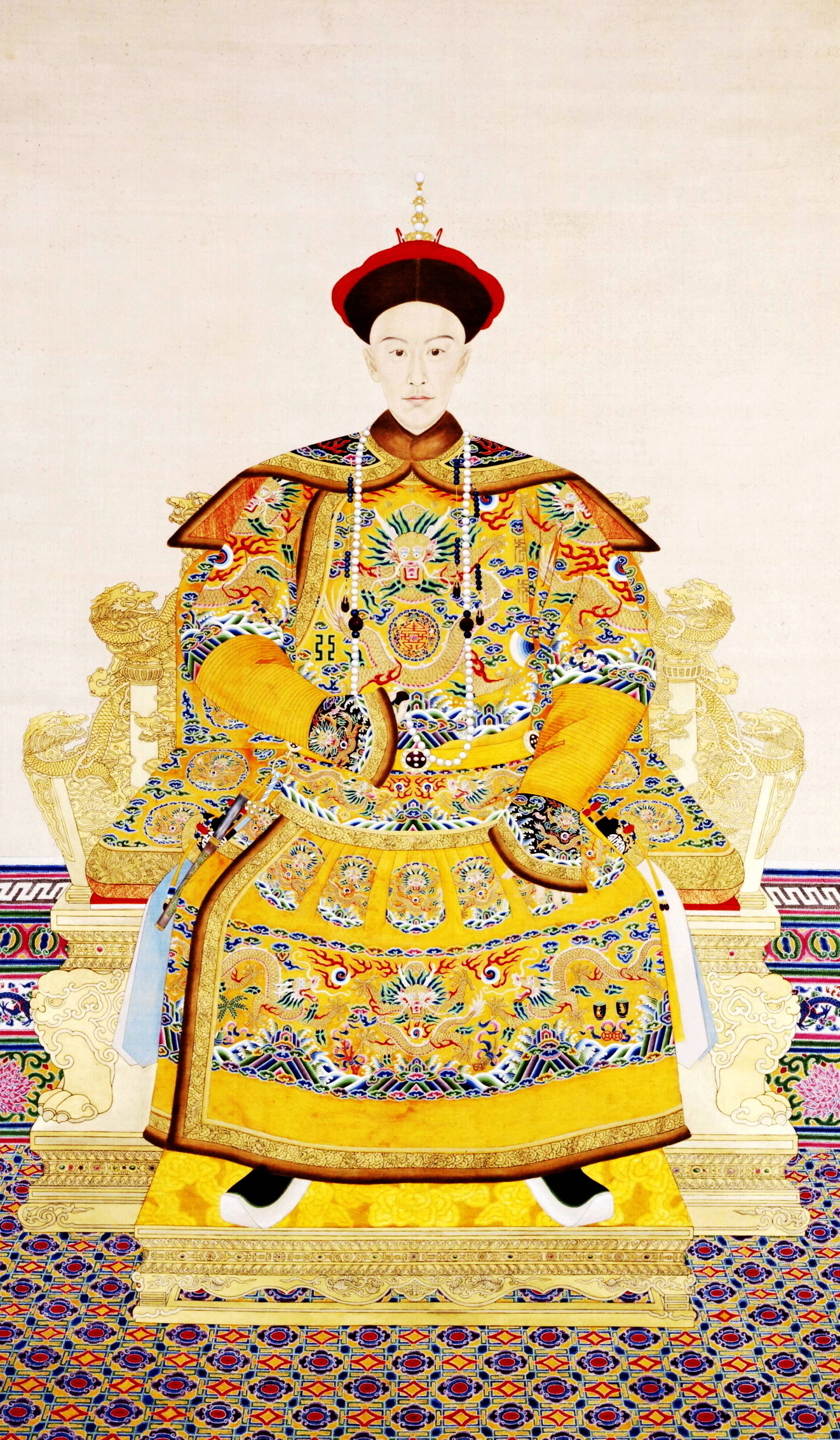
Sun was the Guangxu Emperor's tutor and advisor.

Following the humiliation of the Sino-Japanese War, officials began to advocate for the creation of a national university to strengthen and modernize the Chinese state. In 1896, a memorial ostensibly from the official Li Duanfen (but likely composed by his relative Liang Qichao) was sent to Emperor Guangxu, requesting the university's establishment. Sun wrote in favor of this document, stating that prior western-style government schools (such as naval colleges or the Tongwen Guan) only taught individual skills, rather than a unified educational framework. He sought to combine western and Chinese-style education into a single institution. Sun criticized what he saw as extreme westernization in Japan, writing that "absolutely must not do as the Japanese have done, dispensing with their own learning in favor of Western learning".

Sun stressed that the western powers invested large amount of money and resources into their national universities, and advocated that such an institution should be located in the capital of Beijing, in order to serve as a unifying cultural symbol. He created a draft curriculum for the institution which mixed western and Chinese learning and centered around ten disciplines: astronomy, classics, politics, literature, military science, engineering, commerce, and medicine. The emperor approved the establishment of the university and appointed Sun the Director of Educational Affairs (管學大臣; Guǎnxué dàchén) in order to organize it. However, the university's establishment was delayed by conservative leaders such as Pujing, Prince Yi and Gangyi, who stressed the expenses required by the institution.

On 11 June 1898, Emperor Guangxu began the Hundred Days' Reform. Sun emerged as one of his most trusted officials during this period, and was frequently called to weigh in on proposed reforms. However, as Sun was not a member of the Grand Council, he was only able to meet with the emperor six times during the Hundred Days, mainly communicating with him in writing. In July, Sun wrote to the emperor requesting that Feng Guifen's reformist text Jiaobinlu kangyi (校邠廬抗議; 'Protest from the Jiaobin Studio') be printed and distributed among court officials. The emperor approved this the same day, and around a thousand copies were distributed on 1 August, with encouragement for bureaucrats to make commentaries and notes.

During the reforms, Censor Song Bolu petitioned the government to take over the production of Liang's Shanghai periodical Shiwu bao and convert it into a reformist government gazette under Liang's leadership. Sun agreed with this proposal, but placed Kang Youwei in charge of the gazette in lieu of Liang, who had already been tasked with translation projects. This greatly upset Kang, who wished to stay in Beijing in order to gain political influence within the central government. Kang attempted to modify Sun's guidelines for the paper to obtain greater control over its content, but was forced to defer to Sun's leadership. Unable to gain control of the paper in Shanghai from its owner Wang Kangnian, Kang attempted to halt its publication. Viceroy Zhang Zhidong wrote to Sun to ask whether this action was officially-sanctioned; Sun responded that Kang was acting on his own initiative and should be ignored.

The opening of the university became a priority for the reformers, with a third of Emperor Guangxu's 11 June edict inaugurating the reform campaign dedicated to the establishment of the institution. Sun was promoted to the post of Assistant Grand Secretary. Sun appointed Kang and Liang to prepare a charter and set of regulations for the university, which were approved on 3 July. Although proposed by more radical reformists, Sun was seen as a moderate and tasked to serve as the first imperial minister of the university, managing its operations and staffing.

=== University minister ===
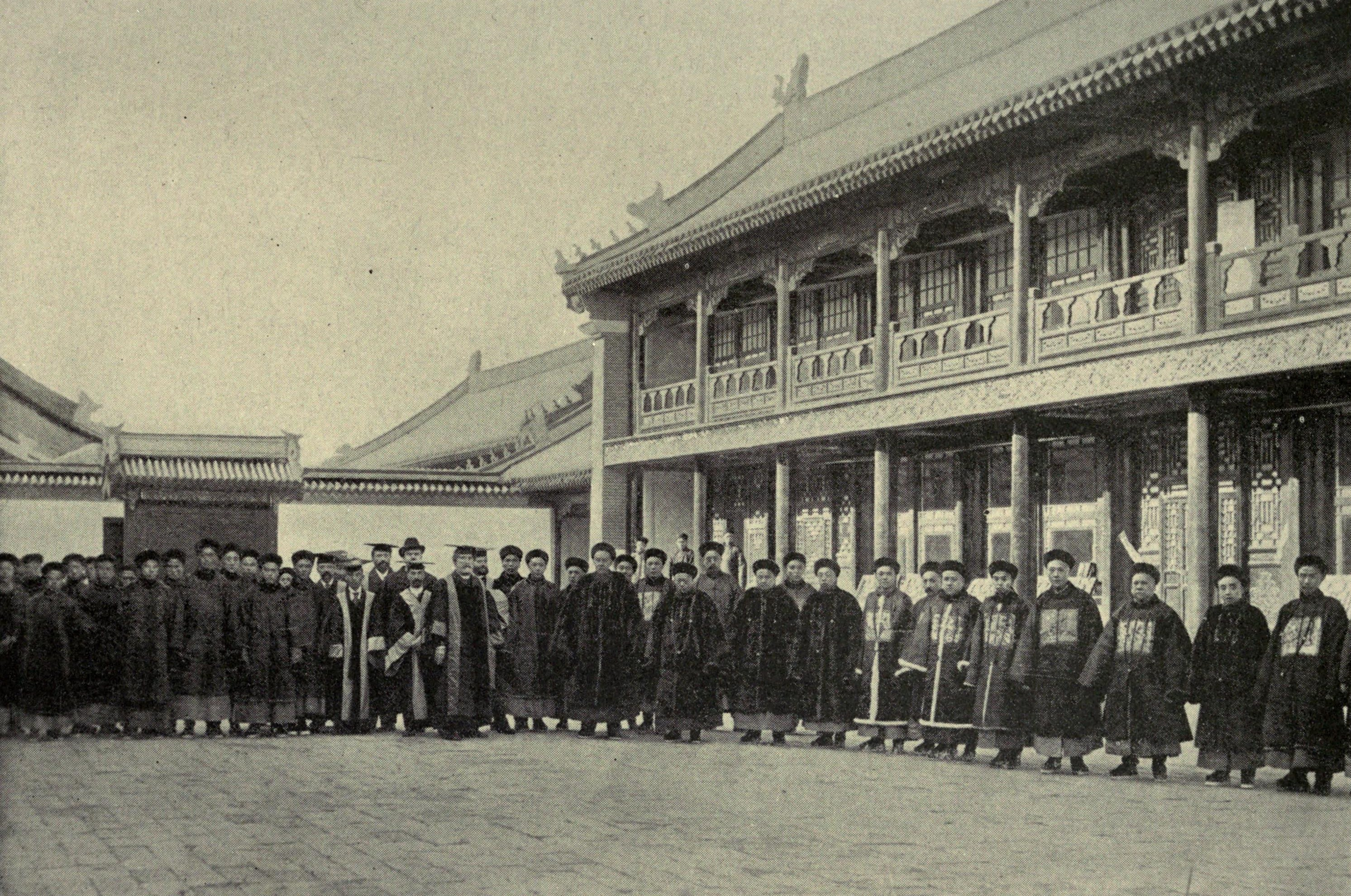
Faculty of the Imperial University with W. A. P. Martin

The Imperial University of Peking was officially founded on 9 August. Sun almost exclusively hired administrators from the ranks of senior government officials. He appointed Hanlin Academy compiler Huang Shaoji as the university supervisor, diplomat Xu Jingcheng as the chief supervisor of Chinese learning, and former Tongwen Guan head W. A. P. Martin as head of faculty and supervisor of Western learning. Sun's appointment of Martin balanced the power between other Chinese officials, allowing Sun greater control over the institution in lieu of its supervisors. This was also likely motivated by the political conflict between Sun and Kang, who was seeking appointment to the supervisor position. As Martin was not a jinshi, Sun petitioned the imperial government to grant him a nominal bureaucratic post.

Sun hired a number of foreign instructors at much higher wages than their Chinese peers. They were mainly missionaries, as the government was unwilling to recruit talent from overseas. Western embassies in the capital lobbied for their nationals to be hired as instructors. Sun advocated for the university to establish a translation bureau in order to compile and translate foreign textbooks for use in an envisioned national university system. This, alongside another request to open a medical studies facility, was granted by the emperor. He additionally requested that a college be established at the university aimed at officials already holding juren and jinshi degrees, and that university agents should be sent to Japan to study their higher education system.

In late September, Empress Dowager Cixi launched a coup d'état, halted the emperor's reforms, and purged many officials. The university was the lone institution established during the reform period to survive, and Sun was able to continue in his position as president of the institution. He scaled back his earlier plans for the institution in the more conservative environment, maintaining that the university's primary purpose was to teach the Chinese classics. However, conservatives within the imperial government continued to oppose the university, and despite political support from Grand Councilor Ronglu, Sun was unable to secure funding to expand it. Rumors of a plot against Emperor Guangxu led Sun to request to retire from his post, citing poor health; this was rejected several times, but he was eventually allowed to retire with full pay in late 1899.

== Later life ==
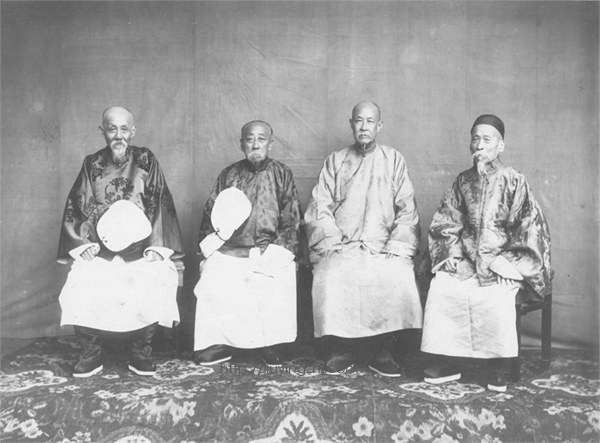
Left to right: Wang Wenshao, Mingan, Sun Jianai, and Yu Shi, c. 1903

During the Boxer Rebellion, Sun's home in Beijing was looted by the Kansu Braves due to his connections with Emperor Guangxu. Rebels destroyed the Imperial University during the fighting. Sun followed Cixi to the provisional capital of Xi'an, where he was again made president of the Ministry of Civil Appointments the following year. In early 1902, he became the Grand Secretary of the Tiran Ge. He was one of eight designated examiners for the 1903 and 1904 metropolitan imperial examinations.

In order to mediate conflict, Sun was appointed in 1904 to manage the reestablished Imperial University alongside his initial replacement as president, Zhang Baixi, as well as the bannerman Rongqing. However, due to Sun's age, most policy decisions were made by Zhang. Sun served on a commission alongside Qu Hongji to study foreign governments for possible reforms, producing small-scale proposals due to conservative opposition. In 1908, he was given the honorary title of Grand Tutor of the Heir Apparent. He was named as the presumptive chairman of the National Assembly, but died on 29 November 1909, a year before the assembly could convene. He was given the posthumous name Wenzheng.

== Notes ==
=== Sources ===
- Chang, Hao (1980). "Intellectual Change and the Reform Movement, 1890–98". In Fairbank, John K. (ed.). The Cambridge History of China. Vol. 11, Late Ch'ing, 1800–1911, Part 2. Cambridge University Press. pp. 274–338. doi:10.1017/CHOL9780521220293. ISBN 9781139054782.
- Dennerline, Jerry (2002). "The Shun-chih Reign". In Peterson, Willard J. (ed.). The Cambridge History of China. Vol. 9, Part 1: The Ch'ing Empire to 1800. Cambridge University Press. pp. 73–119. doi:10.1017/CHOL9780521243346. ISBN 9781139053532.
- Fan, Peiwei (1995). "Educational Reforms, 1903-1904". Chinese Studies in History. 28 (3–4): 85–100. doi:10.2753/CSH0009-463328030485.
- Fang, Chao-ying (1943). Hummel, Arthur W. Sr. (ed.). Eminent Chinese of the Ch'ing Period. Vol. 2. United States Government Printing Office.
- Lin, Xiaoqing Diana (2005). Peking University: Chinese Scholarship and Intellectuals, 1898–1937. Albany: SUNY Press. ISBN 9780791463222.
- Kwong, Luke S. K. (1984). A Mosaic of the Hundred Days: Personalities, Politics, and Ideas of 1898. Vol. 112. Cambridge: Harvard University Press. doi:10.2307/j.ctt1tfjbj1. ISBN 9780674587427. JSTOR j.ctt1tfjbj1.
- Kwong, Luke S. K. (2000). "Chinese Politics at the Crossroads: Reflections on the Hundred Days Reform of 1898". Modern Asian Studies. 34 (3): 663–695. doi:10.1017/S0026749X00003814.
- Weston, Timothy B. (2002). "The Founding of the Imperial University and the Emergence of Chinese Modernity". In Karl, Rebecca E.; Zarrow, Peter (eds.). Rethinking the 1898 Reform Period: Political and Cultural Change in Late Qing China. Cambridge: Harvard University Asia Center. pp. 99–123. doi:10.1163/9781684173747_006. ISBN 9781684173747.
- Weston, Timothy B. (2004). The Power of Position: Beijing University, Intellectuals, and Chinese Political Culture, 1898-1929. Berkeley: University of California Press. ISBN 9780520929906. JSTOR 10.1525/j.ctt1ppjrx.
