= Zhao Shuqiao =

Qing dynasty politician

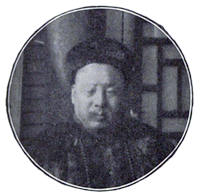

Grand Councillor
- In office 12 December 1899 – 13 February 1900

Minister of Zongli Yamen
- In office 17 December 1898 – 13 February 1900

Minister of Justice
- In office 5 October 1898 – 3 November 1900 Serving with Chongli (until 1900), Guiheng (since 1900)
- Preceded by: Liao Shouheng
- Succeeded by: Xue Yunsheng

Governor of Jiangsu
- In office 18 April 1895 – 4 August 1897
- Preceded by: Kuijun
- Succeeded by: Kuijun

Personal details
- Born: 1848
- Died: 24 February 1901 (aged 52–53) Xi'an
- Education: Jinshi degree in the Imperial Examination (1874)
- Occupation: politician, legal scholar
- Courtesy name: Zhanru (展如)
- Art name: Qinfang (琴舫)

Zhao Shuqiao (Chinese: 趙舒翹, 1848–1901), courtesy name Zhanru (展如), was a politician and legal scholar of Qing dynasty. He was a prominent figure of the "jurisprudence of Shaanxi sect" (陝派律學).

Zhao obtained the highest degree (jinshi) in the imperial examination in 1874. He was made the literary official of the Ministry of Justice (刑部主事), later promoted to the assistant director of the Ministry of Justice (刑部員外郎). He was described as a strict law enforcement official who investigated and dealt with many unjust cases during his tenure, including the "Case of Wang Shuwen" (王樹汶案). Later, he had served as the magistrate of Fengyang Prefecture (鳳陽知府), Circuit intendant of Wenzhou (溫州道台), financial commissioner of Zhejiang (浙江布政使), governor of Jiangsu and other positions. He was appointed the senior deputy minister of justice (刑部左侍郎) in 1897 and promoted to the minister in the next year.

During the Boxer Rebellion, the Boxers occupied Zhuozhou, Zhao was sent there to disperse them. In Gao Shu's (高樹) Trivial Records of a Golden Bell (金鑾瑣記) recorded that Gangyi recommended that Zhao Shuqiao travel to Zhuozhou to "investigate the Boxers and secretly invite them to enter Beijing". Zhao Shuqiao believed that the Boxers could not be relied on, and wrote a memorial to explain. However, because the Empress Dowager Cixi believed deeply in the Boxers, and the courtiers also fawned over the Empress Dowager, he did not dare to hand over the memorial. Soon after, the Boxers swarmed into the capital and busied themselves with burning and killing.

When Beijing fell to the Eight-Nation Alliance in 1900, Zhao Shuqiao and other officials fled to Xi'an with Empress Dowager Cixi. During the negotiations for the Boxer Protocol, Zhao was named as one of the masterminds behind the rebellion. The Empress Dowager Cixi planned to execute him however, after hundreds of Xi'an citizens petitioned for his pardon, she finally decided to force him to commit suicide. Zhao committed suicide on 24 February 1901.

== Publications ==
- Ti lao bei kao (提牢備考) (1893)
