= Ministry of Ceremonies (China) =

Ministry of Han China

Agency overview
- Preceding agency: Upholder of Ceremonies (奉常)
- Superseding agency: Upholder of Ceremonies (奉常)
- Minister responsible: Court Astronomer

The Ministry of Ceremonies (Chinese: 太常寺; pinyin: Tàicháng sì) was one of the nine ministries of the Chinese Han dynasty. The Minister of Ceremonies (Chinese: 太常; pinyin: Tàicháng), also known as Grand Master of Ceremonies, was the chief official in charge of religious rites, rituals, prayers, and the maintenance of ancestral temples and altars. The role's title was changed to Upholder of Ceremonies (Chinese: 奉常; pinyin: Fèngcháng) from 195 to 144 BC before reverting to the original title. Although his main concern was to link the emperor with the supernatural world and Heaven, he was also given the task of setting educational standards for the Imperial University (est. 124 BC) and the academic chairs (Chinese: 博士; pinyin: bóshì) who specialized in the Five Classics, the canon of Confucianism.

One of the Minister of Ceremonies' many subordinates was the Court Astronomer (Chinese: 太史令; pinyin: Tàishǐ lìng; also known as the Prefect Grand Astrologer), who made astronomical observations and drafted the annual lunisolar calendar. The Court Astronomer also upheld a literacy test of 9,000 characters for nominees aspiring to become subordinate officials for either the Minister Steward or Palace Assistant Imperial Clerk. These nominees were often recommended subordinates of commandery-level Administrators. Other subordinates of the Minister of Ceremonies reported illegal acts at ancestral temples, prepared sacrificial offerings of food and wine at shrines and temples, and arranged for the music and dancing that accompanied ceremonies.

This would be the precursor to the Ministry of Rites during the Sui and Tang dynasties, and the State Administration for Religious Affairs in present-day China.

== See also ==
- Government of the Han dynasty
- Ministry of Rites
- Ministry of Culture and Tourism (China)
  - Home Affairs Bureau
  - Secretariat for Social Affairs and Culture
- Ministry of Culture (Taiwan)
- State Administration for Religious Affairs
