= Lianyuan (Manchu politician) =

- 聯元
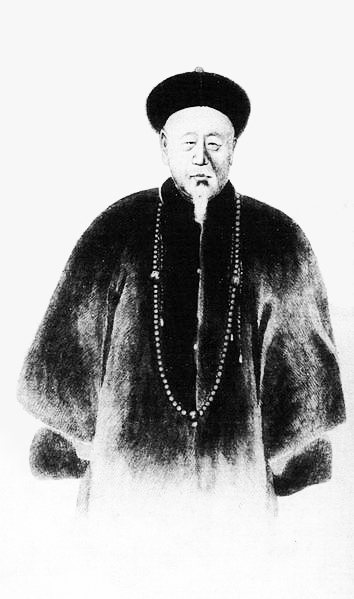
- Lianyuan

Minister of Zongli Yamen
- In office December 17, 1898 – August 1900

Minister of Court of Imperial Sacrifices
- In office April 12 – May 10, 1900 Serving with Yuan Chang
- Preceded by: Guichun
- Succeeded by: Tetušen

Personal details
- Born: 1838
- Died: August 11, 1900 (aged 61–62) Caishikou Execution Grounds, Beijing, Qing Empire
- Cause of death: decapitation
- Education: Jinshi degree in the Imperial Examination (1868)
- Occupation: politician, government official
- Clan name: Cuigiya (崔佳)
- Courtesy name: Xianheng (仙蘅)
- Posthumous name: Wenzhi (文直)

Military service
- Allegiance: Qing dynasty
- Branch/service: Manchu Bordered Red Banner

Lianyuan (Chinese: 聯元; Manchu: ᠯᡞᠶᠠᠨᠶᡠᠸᠠᠨ, 1838–August 11, 1900), courtesy name Xianheng (仙蘅), was a Qing dynasty official from the Manchu Cuigiya clan and the Bordered Red Banner of the Eight Banners. He was best known for his role during the Boxer Rebellion and his execution afterward for his views about how to pacify the internal and external chaos caused by the rebellion.

== Career ==
Lianyuan obtained his Jinshi title by passing the imperial exams in 1868. He was then elected a Shujishi, a temporary position held by elites among the Jinshi rank. His first official appointment as an officer was in the Anqing Fu. He mainly administered the internal affairs of Anhui Province before being summoned to the capital in 1899. Lianyuan was appointed as a supernumerary official of Zongli Yamen, the "de facto" foreign ministry of China during the late Qing dynasty. Soon after, he was promoted to the Secretary of Cabinet (內閣學士).

After the Boxer Rebellion's outbreak, xenophobic rebels attacked the embassies of many European countries. At that point in time, some Chinese government officials could not resist the temptation to expel westerners by the means of this very rebellion. The rebellion was largely against the European powers and consequently drew the sympathy of numerous government officials. During an imperial conference, Xu Tong and Chongqi, both sympathetic to the Boxer rebels, claimed, "The sentiment of the people can be used." This claim was met by opposition from Lianyuan. He insisted that "The sentiment of the people can be used, but the sentiment of criminals cannot be used."

In 1900, the Eight-Nation Alliance captured Taku Forts. The siege of Beijing and its fall marked the failure of the sympathizing policy about the Boxer rebellion. However, ultraconservative members among the Chinese officials tried to initiate a total resistance by moving the capital to the western city of Xi'an. Prince Zaiyi firmly held his aggression against the invading European alliance. Lianyuan found the prince's idea to be quite dangerous, and he retorted that China could not possibly win the war against the eight-country alliance, seeing that China already lost the First Sino-Japanese War to Japan, a single modernized power. The prince denounced his ominous words. The Empress Dowager Cixi was angered and decided to execute Lianyuan. On August 11, 1900. He was executed at the Caishikou Execution Grounds along with Lishan and Xu Yongyi, who shared similar opinions.

On September 7, 1901, the Boxer Protocol was signed between China and the Eight-Nation Alliance. China agreed to put the rebellion to rest and compensate the invading forces for their losses. Among the protocols, five Chinese officials, Xu Yongyi, Lishan, Xu Jingcheng, Lianyuan and Yuan Chang, were mentioned for their consistent opposition to the violent solution. The protocol demanded that they be rewarded. Accordingly, Lianyuan was then posthumously rehabilitated and given the posthumous name Wenzhi (文直).
