= Xu Tong =

Chinese Qing dynasty official (1819–1900)

Imperial tutor Xu Tong 徐桐
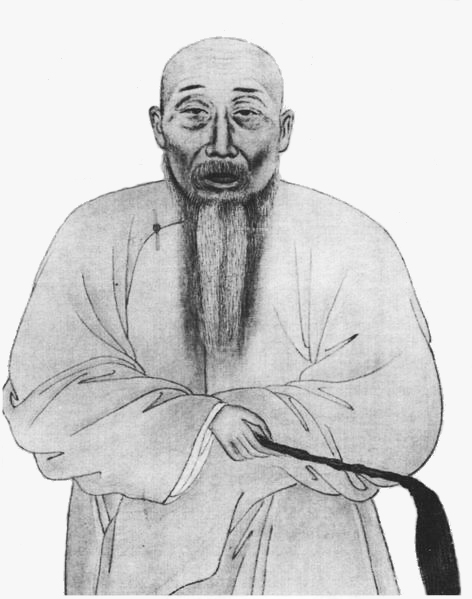

Grand Secretary of the Tiren Hall
- In office 12 June 1896 – 13 August 1900 (4 years, 62 days)

Assistant Grand Secretary
- In office 18 February 1889 – 12 June 1896 (7 years, 115 days)

Minister of Personnel
- In office 10 April 1884 – 2 December 1896 (12 years, 236 days)
- Preceded by: Li Hongzao
- Succeeded by: Li Hongzao

Minister of Rites
- In office 19 June 1878 – 10 April 1884 (5 years, 296 days)
- Preceded by: Wan Qingli
- Succeeded by: Bi Daoyuan

Personal details
- Born: 1819
- Died: 13 August 1900 (aged 80–81) Beijing
- Relations: Xu Chengyu (son)
- Parent: Xu Zechun (father)
- Occupation: politician
- Courtesy name: Yuru (豫如)
- Art name: Yinxuan (廕軒)

Military service
- Allegiance: Qing dynasty
- Branch/service: Han Chinese Plain Blue Banner
- Battles/wars: Boxer Rebellion

Xu Tong (Chinese: 徐桐, 1819 – 13 August 1900) was a Qing dynasty official from the Han Chinese Plain Blue Banner.

Xu Tong was a son of Xu Zechun (徐澤醇), whom had been made the Minister of Rites. He obtained the highest degree (jinshi) in the imperial examination and was selected a shujishi of the Hanlin Academy in 1850. Since 1862 he was made the tutor of the Palace School (上書房) for Tongzhi Emperor. Later, he had served as chief minister of the Court of Imperial Sacrifices (太常寺卿), Junior Deputy Minister of Rites (禮部右侍郎), Minister of Rites, Minister of Personnel, Assistant Grand Secretary, Grand Secretary of the Tiren Library and other positions.

Xu Tong was a Neo-Confucianist who was hostile to Western culture. His residence was located in Dongjiaomin Lane, not far from the Peking Legation Quarter. Hated having foreigners as neighbors, he posted a couplet on his door to mock them. Xu Tong was one of the main supporters of the Boxers. During the Boxer Rebellion, he advocated using the Boxer to support Empress Dowager Cixi's declaration of war against the Westerners, Xu Tong and Chongqi, two high court officials in Beijing, submitted a memorial to the court unambiguously demanding the killing of all Chinese Christians and foreigners in China. In the memorial he wrote "regardless of which province or place, if there are foreigners in the territory, the people should kill them directly." (無論何省何地，見有洋人在境，徑聽百姓殲除). However, when the Boxers besieged the International Legations, they burned, killed and looted, even Xu's house was not spared. It is said that even Xu himself was dragged out from house for trial. He knelt down and begged for mercy, which saved him from death.

When Beijing fell to the Eight-Nation Alliance in 1900, he committed suicide by hanging. His third son, Xu Chengyu, buried his body in the backyard. The women of the Xu family, ranging from a few years old to over 80 years old, committed suicide collectively. Later, the victorious Eight-Nation Alliance named Xu Tong as one of the masterminds behind the rebellion. Xu Tong was dismissed from all official positions by Qing court posthumously.
