= Li Fengbao =

Chinese diplomat

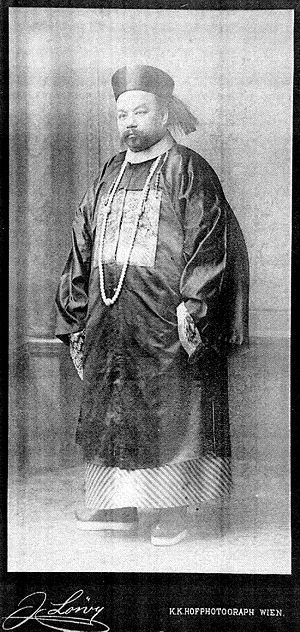
- Li in Vienna

Chinese Ambassador to France
- In office 1884–1884
- Preceded by: Xu Jingcheng (didn't take office)
- Succeeded by: Xu Jingcheng

Personal details
- Born: 1834 Chongming, Jiangsu Province, Qing Empire
- Died: 6 August 1887 (aged 52–53) Chongming, Jiangsu Province, Qing Empire
- Occupation: Diplomat, politician, government official

Li Fengbao (1834–1887, simplified Chinese: 李凤苞; traditional Chinese: 李鳳苞), courtesy name Haike (海客), art name Dan'ya (丹涯), was a late Qing dynasty Chinese diplomat. He was the imperial commissioner or ambassador of China to Germany between 1878 and 1884. During this time, Li also held the concurrent posts of the ambassador to Austro-Hungary, the Netherlands (1881-1884) and Italy.

== Life ==
Li was born in Chongming, then a part of Jiangsu province. In his early years, he was especially fond of the study of astronomy as well as mapping, military strategy and phonology. His talents were appreciated by Ding Richang, governor of Jiangsu. Ding recommended him to Li Hongzhang. Under Li Hongzhang, Li Fengbao worked at Jiangnan Shipyard and Wusong Battery.

In 1875, as a secretary of Li Hongzhang, he participated Hongzhang's meeting with British officer Thomas Francis Wade. In 1877, he was appointed the supervisor of oversea Chinese student in Britain. These students were sent by the Qing government with the purpose of learning advanced naval technologies. Along with Li was the French naval officer Prosper Giquel who was another supervisor of the students.

In August 1878, he was appointed the commissioner of China to Germany and later Austria-Hungary, Netherlands and Italy after his predecessor Liu Xihong was recalled to the imperial court. Diplomatic affairs between France and China also concerned Li, according to historical records. During Sino-French War, Li actively involved in the delivery of the battleship Chinese ironclad Dingyuan from Germany to China. In 1881, Li visited Leiden University, Netherlands and met with German scholar Johann Joseph Hoffmann.

Although being an experienced officer and diplomat, Li was not trusted by the conservative power-blocs in Qing's court. When Chinese cruiser Jiyuan's construction was completed, rumors in Beijing spread and Li was accused of embezzlement of government funds. He was impeached by imperial censors and was dismissed once and for all from the court. Despite the fact that the cruiser Jiyuan functioned well after arriving in China, Li's dismissal was not reversed. On August 6, 1887, Li died in his hometown Chongming after suffering from depression for several years, aged 53.

== Works ==
Li Fengbao contributed to the early advancement of modern Chinese artillery. He was among the first ones to translate technical documents of Western artillery. When the Qing dynasty government purchased cannons from Krupp, his translations no doubt were the key to the understanding of the cannons' way of functioning.

In addition, Li Fengbao translated the German infantry drill codes from German to Chinese. This code in turn was adopted by the new armies, modernized infantry troops of Qing dynasty.

Li also left his "Diary of the ministerial trip to Germany" (使德日記). The diary is one of the few Qing dynasty historical documents that contains a detailed description of the Western society during the late 19th century.
