= Yuan Chang (official) =

Yunqiwei Yuan Chang
- 袁昶
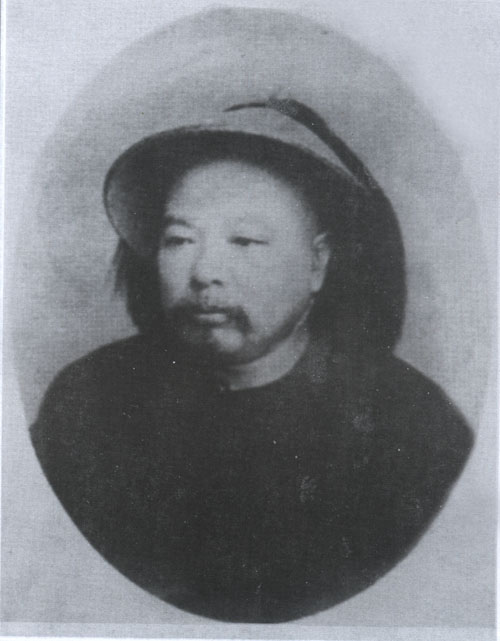

Minister of Zongli Yamen
- In office 2 October 1898 – 28 July 1900

Minister of Court of Imperial Sacrifices
- In office 21 July 1899 – 28 July 1900 Serving with Qingfu (until 1899), Guichun (1899–1900), Lianyuan (1900), Tetušen(1900)
- Preceded by: Li Zhaowei (acting)
- Succeeded by: Wang Peiyou

Minister of Court of Imperial Entertainments
- In office 6 April – 21 July 1899 Serving with Changming
- Preceded by: Lü Haihuan
- Succeeded by: Guo Cengxin

Personal details
- Born: Yuan Zhenchan (袁振蟾); 1846 Tonglu County, Zhejiang, Qing Empire
- Died: 28 July 1900 (aged 53–54) Caishikou Execution Grounds, Beijing, Qing Empire
- Cause of death: decapitation
- Education: jinshi in the imperial examination (1867)
- Occupation: politician, poet

Yuan Chang (Chinese: 袁昶, 1846–1900), courtesy name Shuangqiu (爽秋), was a politician and poet of Qing dynasty. He was a prominent figure of the "Tong–Guang genre" (同光體), a poetry genre popular during the Tongzhi and Guangxu era.

He obtained the jinshi in the imperial examination and was appointed the Main Adviser of the Ministry of Revenue (戶部主事) in 1867. Later he had served as the Military Secretary of the Ministry of Zongli Yamen (總理各國事務衙門章京), editor of Collected Statutes Institute (會典館纂修官), assistant director of Jiangxi Department of the Ministry of Revenue (戶部江西司員外郎) and other positions. He was appointed the intendant of Hui–Ning–Chi–Tai-Guang Circuit (徽寧池太廣道道台) in 1892. During his term, he carried out tax reforms, built water conservancy projects, set up post office, and established academies. As a believer of ti-yong idea, he established several practical learning new departments in Zhongjiang Academy (中江書院) in Wuhu, such as Confucian classics (經史), Xingli (性理), geomancy and fortune-telling (輿算), Physics (格致).

In 1898 he was promoted to the Judicial Commissioner of Shaanxi (陝西按察使), Before taking office, he was made the Administrative Commissioner of Jiangning (江寧布政使) then transferred to Zhili. He was appointed the Minister of Zongli Yamen, the Minister of Court of Imperial Entertainments, then the Minister of Court of Imperial Sacrifices.

The Boxers launched a rebellion in Shandong and massacred foreign priests. Empress Dowager Cixi held an imperial meeting in Yiluan Palace (儀鑾宮) and planned to use the Boxers to start a war against the Westerners. Yuan Chang, Xu Jingcheng, and Lishan firmly opposed war with Westerners and believed that declaring war against Western countries would lead to defeat. Yuan Chang issued two memorials, arguing that rebels should not be indulged and foreign envoys should not be killed. However, Cixi did not respond. He and Xu Jingcheng jointly signed a memorial to impeach Prince Duan and other ministers who had caused the turmoil. Before the memorial could be delivered, Prince Duan preemptively detained him at home.

Yuan Chang and Xu Jingcheng were dismissed from office and later, executed on 28 July 1900. During the negotiations for the Boxer Protocol, Xu Yongyi, Lishan, Xu Jingcheng, Lianyuan and Yuan Chang were posthumously rehabilitated by Qing dynasty. Yuan was given the posthumous name "Zhongjie" (忠節).
