= Xu Yongyi =

Politician of Qing dynasty

- 徐用儀
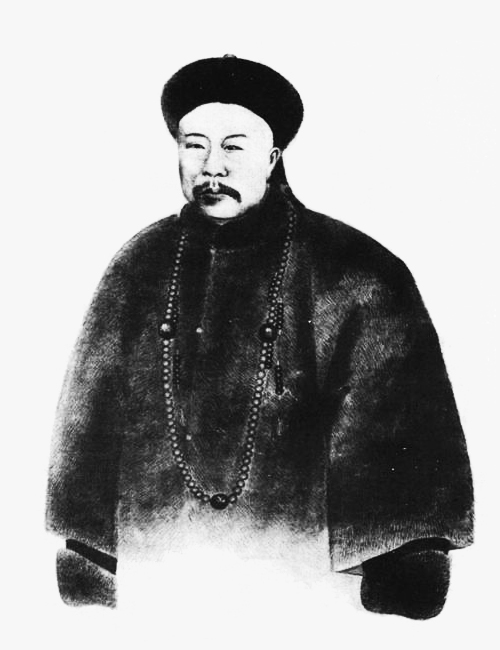

Minister of Zongli Yamen
- In office 26 September 1898 – 11 August 1900
- In office 24 June 1884 – 6 August 1895

Grand Councilor
- In office 9 January 1894 – 6 August 1895

Minister of War
- In office 27 December 1899 – 11 August 1900 Serving with Gangyi (until 1900), Jingxin (1900)
- Preceded by: Xu Pu
- Succeeded by: Xu Huifeng

Personal details
- Born: 22 October 1826 Haiyan County, Zhejiang
- Died: 11 August 1900 (aged 73) Caishikou Execution Grounds, Beijing, Qing Empire
- Cause of death: decapitation
- Education: juren degree in the Shuntian Provincial Examination (1859)
- Occupation: politician, government official
- Courtesy name: Wenyun (筱雲)
- Posthumous name: Zhongmin (忠愍)

Xu Yongyi (Chinese: 徐用儀, 22 October 1826 – 11 August 1900), courtesy name Wenyun (筱雲), was a politician of Qing dynasty.

Xu Yongyi took the Shuntian Provincial Examination (順天鄉試) and obtained a juren degree in 1859. He had served as the Military Secretary of Grand Council (軍機章京), Deputy Minister of the Court of State Ceremonial (鴻臚寺少卿), Deputy Minister of the Court of the Imperial Stud (太僕寺少卿), Minister of the Court of Judicature and Revision (大理寺卿) and other positions. He was appointed Junior Deputy Minister of Works (工部右侍郎) in 1882. Since 1884 he became the Minister of Zongli Yamen. In 1893 he was made the Senior Deputy Minister of Personnel (吏部左侍郎) and the Grand Councilor.

When the First Sino-Japanese War broke out, Xu Yongyi, Li Hongzhang, and Sun Yuwen (孫毓汶) advocated avoiding war, while Weng Tonghe, the Guangxu Emperor's tutor, supported war against Japan. After signing of the Treaty of Shimonoseki, Xu Yongyi and Sun Yuwen were expelled from the offices of the Grand Council and the Zongli Yamen.

Xu stood in the way of Hundred Days' Reform. After the Empress Dowager Cixi launched a coup in 1898, he was made the Minister of Zongli Yamen again. Xu was appointed the Minister of War in the next year. He objected to recognize Pujun as the presumptive heir to the throne, Prince Duan hated him deeply.

During the Boxer Rebellion, Prince Duan planned to use the Boxers to fight against the Westerners, Boxers were secretly invited to enter Beijing. Soon after, the Boxers swarmed into the capital and busied themselves with burning and killing. Xu Yongyi proposed a strict ban on the actions of the Boxers, but this was not accepted. After learning that the German Minister Clemens von Ketteler had been killed by the Boxers, Xu said: "This is the beginning of the disaster". He suggested to hold an elaborate funeral and bury von Ketteler. In the same year Eight-Nation Alliance was sent to China to lift the siege of Legation Quarter. When the Alliance approached Tianjin, the court officials were summoned to the palace for a meeting to discuss countermeasures. Xu Yongyi, Xu Jingcheng, Yuan Chang, Lishan and Lianyuan believed that: "We should not indulge treacherous people and provoke foreigners."

As a stalling tactic, Xu Yongyi went to the Legation Quarter for negotiations on the order of the Empress Dowager Cixi, but his behavior was considered treacherous by Prince Duan. Xu was dismissed from office and imprisoned, and later executed together with Lishan and Lianyuan on 11 August 1900. During the negotiations for the Boxer Protocol, Xu Yongyi, Lishan, Xu Jingcheng, Lianyuan and Yuan Chang were posthumously rehabilitated by Qing dynasty. He was given the posthumous name "Zhongmin" (忠愍) in 1909.

== Publications ==
- Zheng dun Huan fa shu (整頓圜法疏)
- Hai yan xian zhi (海鹽縣志)
- Zhu yin lu shi cun (竹隱廬詩存)
