= Xu Jingcheng =

Chinese diplomat and politician

- 許景澄
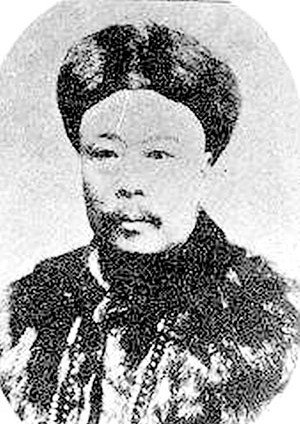
- A photograph of Xu Jingcheng

Minister of Zongli Yamen
- In office 2 November 1898 – 28 July 1900

Chinese Ambassador to Germany (concurrently served as Ambassador to France)
- In office 28 April 1884 – 23 June 1887
- Preceded by: Li Fengbao
- Succeeded by: Lü Haihuan

Personal details
- Born: Xu Guishen (許癸身); 22 October 1845 Jiaxing, Zhejiang Province, Qing Empire
- Died: 28 July 1900 (aged 54) Caishikou Execution Grounds, Beijing, Qing Empire
- Cause of death: decapitation
- Education: Jinshi degree in the Imperial Examination
- Occupation: Diplomat, politician, government official
- Courtesy name: Zhuoyun (倬畇)
- Art name: Zhúyún (竹筠)
- Posthumous name: Wensu (文肅)

Xu Jingcheng
- Traditional Chinese: 許景澄
- Simplified Chinese: 许景澄
Transcriptions
Standard Mandarin
- Hanyu Pinyin: Xǔ Jǐngchéng
- Wade–Giles: Hsü^{3} Ching^{3}-ch'eng^{2}
- IPA: [ɕỳ tɕìŋʈʂʰə̌ŋ]

Xu Jingcheng (Chinese: 許景澄; pinyin: Xǔ Jǐngchéng; Wade–Giles: Hsü Ching-ch'eng; 22 October 1845 – 28 July 1900) was a Chinese diplomat and Qing politician supportive of the Hundred Days' Reform. He was envoy to Belgium, France, Italy, Russia, Austria, the Netherlands, and Germany for the Qing imperial court and led reforms in modernizing China's railways and public works. As a modernizer and diplomat, he protested the breaches of international law in 1900 as one of the five ministers executed during the Boxer Rebellion. In Article IIa of the Boxer Protocol of 1901, the Eight-Nation Alliance that had provided military forces (Austria-Hungary, France, Germany, Italy, Japan, Russia, the United Kingdom, and the United States) successfully pressed for the rehabilitation of Xu Jingcheng by an Imperial Edict of the Qing government:

Imperial Edict of the 13th February last rehabilitated the memories of Hsu Yung-yi, President of the Board of War; Li Shan, President of the Board of Works; Hsu Ching Cheng, Senior VicePresident of the Board of Civil Office; Lien Yuan, Vice-Chancellor of the Grand Council; and Yuan Chang, Vice-President of the Court of Sacrifices, who had been put to death for having protested against the outrageous breaches of international law of last year.

== Early life and career ==
Xu Jingcheng was born in 1845 in Jiaxing, Zhejiang Province, and received his jinshi degree after the 1868 imperial examination. He began his civil service as a bureaucrat in the Hanlin Academy serving as the Bachelor of the six offices of Scrutiny (翰林院庶吉士), a compiler (翰林院編修), and an Academician Expositor-in-waiting (翰林院侍講) until 1884.

As a compiler, he was a keen analyst of foreign and current affairs and was first promoted and appointed as envoy to Japan but failed to journey abroad due to the death of his father and his responsibilities as the eldest son in filial mourning. The end of the mourning period allowed Xu to begin his diplomatic service, succeeding Li Fengbao, first as the Envoy to France, Italy, the Netherlands, Austria, and Germany (1884–1885), and then as the first Qing Envoy to Belgium while also concurrently accredited to France and Germany from 1885 to 1890. During this time, he was charged with inspecting and receiving the new Chinese turret ship Dingyuan Chinese: 定遠, a turret ironclad warship and flagship of the Beiyang Fleet, manufactured by German shipbuilders AG Vulcan Stettin. He wrote an Encyclopedia of Foreign Ships and recommended the modernization of the Qing fleet. Until 1892, Xu was envoy to Russia, Austria, the Netherlands, and Germany.

In 1890, he was recalled to Beijing and was appointed the Secretary of Cabinet (內閣學士) and awarded the brevet title (坐銜) Vice Minister of Rites (禮部侍郎). In 1895, he was promoted as the Senior Vice Minister of Department of Public Works (工部左侍郎), one of the six top ministries of Qing China. During this time, he remained active in diplomacy, serving in various foreign delegations and as Envoy to Germany in 1897 and as the head minister of the Zongli Yamen (Office of Foreign Affairs) from 1895 to 1899. His foreign service also allowed him to serve as an intermediary with foreign railway companies and governments and he was charged with the modernization of major railways in China's industrializing northeast as the president of the Chinese Eastern Railway from January 1897 until his death. His final promotion as the Senior Vice Minister of Ministry of Personnel (吏部左侍郎 also made Xu the Minister of Education and Superintendent of the Imperial University of Peking (now Peking University), posts he served until his execution in 1900.

== Execution ==
A Roman Catholic, Xu was marked with suspicion in the lead up to the Boxer Rebellion. The anti-Christian, anti-foreign, and anti-imperialist movement converged on Beijing in June 1900 after months of violence in Shandong and the North China plain, forcing diplomats, foreigners, and Chinese Christians into the Legation Quarter. Xu, a liberal in the Qing court sided with five other members of the Imperial court, supported a diplomatic resolution and was opposed to an alliance with the Boxer fighters in a war against the foreign powers represented in the Legation Quarter. Along with Hsu Yung-yi, President of the Board of War (Ministry of War); Li Shan, President of the Board of Works (Ministry of Public Works); Lien Yuan, Vice-Chancellor of the Grand Council; and Yuan Chang, vice-president of the Court of Sacrifices (Ministry of Rites), Xu issued a recommendation to Empress Cixi protesting the breaches of international law and urging the repression of the Boxers, the execution of Boxer leaders, and a diplomatic settlement with foreign armies. In his own written memorial (petition) to Cixi, Xu wrote, "the evasion of extraterritoriality rights and the killing of foreign diplomats are unprecedented in China and abroad." Cixi, outraged, sentenced Xu to death for "willfully and absurdly petitioning the Imperial Court" and "building subversive thought" and he was executed on July 28, 1900. His severed head was placed on display at Caishikou Execution Grounds in Beijing.

=== Legacy ===
Xu Jingcheng is memorialized, along with Yuan Chang and Xu Yongyi (Hsu Yung-yi) at Hangzhou's West Lake where a memorial commemorates the three Qing court officials as loyal officials.

=== Roman Catholic influence ===
During his diplomatic career, Xu was also the mentor of the future Premier and Minister of Foreign Affairs of China, Lu Zhengxiang, and was instrumental in Lou's conversion to Roman Catholicism from Protestantism. Xu, as envoy to Russia took an early interest in Lou, a polyglot, in 1893 when he was posted to St Petersburg as an interpreter (fourth-class) to the Chinese embassy. During this time, Lu became increasingly religious under Xu Jingcheng's influence and instructions:

Europe's strength is found not in her armaments, nor in her knowledge — it is found in her religion [...]. Observe the Christian faith. When you have grasped its heart and its strength, take them and give them to China.

The execution of Xu during the Boxer Rebellion paved the way for Lou's service as the Qing delegate at the first and second Peace Conferences in The Hague (1899 and 1907), and as Minister to Belgium and Ambassador to Russia, roles previously held by Xu. Lu referred to Xu as his "second father" and never forgot his execution under the Qing court. When the 1911 Revolution broke out while Lu was Ambassador in St Petersburg, he took it upon himself, against the advice of his colleagues at other European capitals, to cable Beijing that there could be no hope of assistance from the Great Powers. At the death of his wife Lu retired from an active life, and in 1927 became a postulant, under the name Dom Pierre-Célestin, in the Benedictine monastery of Sint-Andries in Bruges, Belgium. He was ordained priest in 1935. In his later years, Lu Zhengxiang hoped to return to China as a missionary to fulfill the instructions Xu Jingcheng had given him at the beginning of his career but his planned departure was postponed during the Chinese Civil War, and Dom Lu died in Belgium on 15 January 1949.

== Publications ==
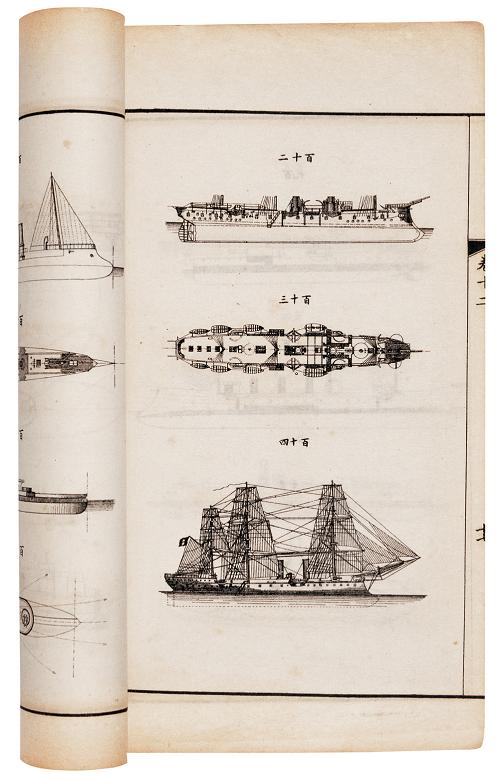
A page from Encyclopedia of Foreign Ships by Xu Jingcheng

See here for a complete list of Xu's publications.

- Pami'er tu shuo (帕米爾圖說)
- Xu Wensu gong wai ji (許文肅公外集)
- Xu Wensu gong ri ji (許文肅公日記)
- Xu Wensu gong shu zha (許文肅公書札)
- Xu Zhuyun xian sheng chu shi han gao (許竹篔先生出使函稿)

In 2015, Zhu Jiaying (朱家英) published a book of Xu's collected works titled Xu Jingcheng ji (許景澄集).
