= Lishan (official) =

Manchu politician

- 立山
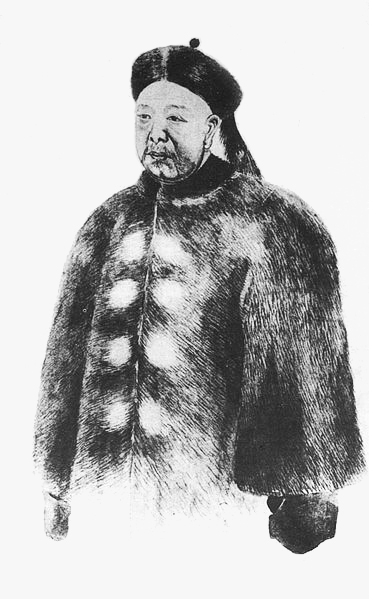

Minister of Revenue
- In office 17 April – 15 July 1900 Serving with Wang Wenshao
- Preceded by: Jingxin
- Succeeded by: Chongqi

Personal details
- Born: 1843
- Died: 11 August 1900 (aged 56–57) Caishikou Execution Grounds, Beijing, Qing Empire
- Cause of death: decapitation
- Education: central government school (guānxué)
- Occupation: politician, government official
- Clan name: Tumet (土默特)
- Courtesy name: Yufu (豫甫)
- Posthumous name: Zhongzhen (忠貞)

Military service
- Allegiance: Qing dynasty
- Branch/service: Mongolian Plain Yellow Banner

Lishan (Chinese: 立山, 1843–1900), from the Tumet clan (土默特氏) with the courtesy name Yufu (豫甫), was a Manchu politician of the late Qing dynasty. He was a member of the Mongolian Plain Yellow Banner.

Lishan entered official life as a bithesi (Chinese: 筆帖式, "clerk") in 1862. In 1879, he was made the Head of Suzhou Waving Department (蘇州織造). Later, he had served as the minister of the Bureau of Imperial Gardens and Parks (奉宸苑卿), minister for the Chancery of the Imperial Household Department (總管內務府大臣), deputy lieutenant-general of the Han Chinese Plain White Banner (正白旗漢軍副都統), then the Junior Deputy Minister of Revenue (戶部右侍郎) and other positions. In 1894, he was awarded the nominal title Crown Prince's Junior Tutor (太子少保). Someone stole items from the Palace of Tranquil Longevity. Due to negligence, he was demoted and temporarily retained in his post.

Lishan was promoted to the Minister of Revenue in 1900. He was deeply trusted by the Empress Dowager Cixi and therefore envied by his colleagues. In the meantime Eight-Nation Alliance was sent to China to lift the siege of Legation Quarter. When the Alliance approached Tianjin, the court officials were summoned to the palace for a meeting to discuss countermeasures. Prince Duan strongly suggested using the Boxers to attack Westerners. As an official close to the Empress Dowager Cixi, Lishan was asked for his opinion. However, Lishan replied: "There's nothing else special about the Boxers but their magic arts are often ineffective." Prince Duan was angried and proposed that Lishan be responsible for persuading the Eight-Nation Allied Forces to withdraw. Lishan claimed that he favored peaceful resolution of conflicts, but he was not familiar with foreign affairs, making him difficult to take on.

Prince Duan hated him even more. Since Lishan's residence was close to a French church, Prince Dan started rumors that he was hiding Westerners and secretly provided food to them through tunnels. Lishan was dismissed from office and imprisoned, and later executed together with Xu Yongyi and Lianyuan on 11 August 1900. During the negotiations for the Boxer Protocol, Xu Yongyi, Lishan, Xu Jingcheng, Lianyuan and Yuan Chang were posthumously rehabilitated by Qing dynasty. He was given the posthumous name "Zhongzhen" (忠貞) in 1909.
