= Zhang Baixi =

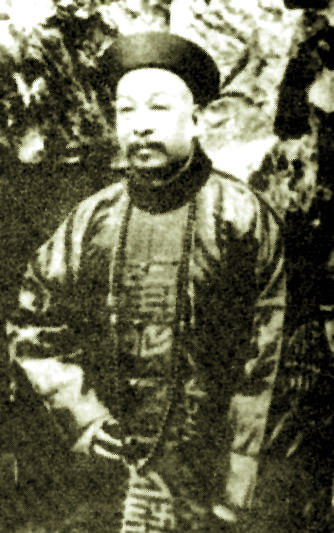
- Zhang in official robes

Minister of Post
- In office November 7, 1906 – March 16, 1907
- Preceded by: New position
- Succeeded by: Lin Shaonian

Minister of Revenue
- In office May 7, 1905 – November 6, 1906 Serving with Rongqing (until 1905), Tieliang (since 1905)
- Preceded by: Zhao Erxun
- Succeeded by: Puting (as minister of Finance)

Minister of Personnel
- In office February 1, 1902 – May 7, 1905 Serving with Jingxin (until 1903), Shixu (1903–1905), Kuijun (since 1905)
- Preceded by: Sun Jianai
- Succeeded by: Lu Chuanlin

Minister of Justice
- In office November 14, 1901 – February 1, 1902 Serving with Guiheng
- Preceded by: Xue Yunsheng
- Succeeded by: Ge Baohua

Minister of Works
- In office July 25 – November 4, 1901 Serving with Songgui
- Preceded by: Qi Hongji
- Succeeded by: Ge Baohua

Personal details
- Born: 1847 Changsha, Qing China
- Died: March 30, 1907 (aged 59–60) Beijing, Qing China
- Occupation: politician, educator

Zhang Baixi (simplified Chinese: 张百熙; traditional Chinese: 張百熙; pinyin: Zhāng Bǎixī; Courtesy Yěqiū (埜秋); Posthumous name: Wéndá (文達)) (1847–March 30, 1907) was a Chinese government official during the late Qing Dynasty who is known for initializing the education reform. He was considered to be the "father of university" in China. Both the Peking University and the Beijing Normal University respect him as a founder and president.

Zhang Baixi was born in Changsha County of Hunan province, where he studied in the top local school, Chengnan 城南书院, under Guo Songtao (1818-1891). In 1874, he earned a Jinshi degree and was elevated to the Hanlin Academy. As high administrator for many years, Zhang Baixi advocated profound political, economical and educational reforms. Although he was a member of the reform group led by Kang Youwei in the Hundred Days Reform of 1898, his role was small enough that his career continued to develop after the reformers were suppressed. After the Boxer Rebellion, partly because there were few surviving officials of ability and experience, he became a close advisor to the Empress Dowager.

Zhang proposed to reopen the Imperial Capital University (京師大學堂, former Peking University) founded in 1898. He had several motivations. One was national pride, to show the world that China could have a world-class university even after the Boxer debacle. A second was to keep higher education under the control of the central government, not local or provincial governments or private universities. He succeeded in getting government funding for an expanded and more impressive campus in the heart of the capital and for a well-supported faculty. Among his priorities for the university was a bureau to translate Japanese books and a compilation bureau which would publish text books of modern knowledge. According to one later official, Zhang's contribution to the development of Peking University was second only to that of Cai Yuanpei.

In 1902, Zhang drafted the "Authorized School Regulation" (《欽定學堂章程》, alternatively called Renyin Educational system (壬寅學制)), "renyin" being the year 1902, which was put into effect by Qing government. In 1904, Zhang participated in the establishment of the "Presented School Regulation" (《奏定學堂章程》, also called "Guimao Educational System" (癸卯學制)), "guimao" being the year 1904, which was the first modern Chinese educational system.

Zhang died in Beijing in 1907.

== References and further reading ==
- Xiaoqing Diana Lin. (SUNY series in Chinese Philosophy and Culture) Peking University, Chinese Scholarship and Intellectuals, 1898-1937. ISBN 0-7914-6321-4; ISBN 978-0-7914-6321-5
- Weston, Timothy B. (2004). The Power of Position: Beijing University, Intellectuals, and Chinese Political Culture, 1898-1929. Berkeley: University of California Press. ISBN 0520237676.
