= Gangyi =

Manchu politician of the late Qing dynasty

Grand Councillor
- In office 1894–1900

Assistant Grand Secretary
- In office 1898–1900

Minister of Personnel
- In office 17 April – 27 October 1900 Serving with Xu Fu
- Preceded by: Xijing
- Succeeded by: Jingxin

Minister of War
- In office 10 June 1898 – 17 April 1900 Serving with Xu Fu (until 1899), Xu Yongyi (since 1899)
- Preceded by: Ronglu
- Succeeded by: Jingxin

Minister of Justice
- In office 4 August 1897 – 10 June 1898 Serving with Liao Shouheng
- Preceded by: Songgui
- Succeeded by: Chongli

Minister of Works
- In office 6 June 1896 – 4 August 1897 Serving with Xu Yingkui
- Preceded by: Huaitabu
- Succeeded by: Songgui

Governor of Guangdong
- In office 7 May 1892 – 4 November 1894
- Preceded by: Liu Ruifen
- Succeeded by: Ma Piyao

Governor of Jiangsu
- In office 20 November 1888 – 7 May 1892
- Preceded by: Songjun
- Succeeded by: Songjun

Governor of Shanxi
- In office 12 April 1885 – 20 November 1888
- Preceded by: Kuibin
- Succeeded by: Wei Rongguang

Personal details
- Born: 1834
- Died: 1900 (aged 65–66) Houma, Shanxi
- Occupation: politician
- Clan name: Tatara
- Courtesy name: Ziliang (子良)

Military service
- Allegiance: Qing dynasty
- Branch/service: Manchu Bordered Blue Banner
- Battles/wars: Boxer Rebellion

Gangyi (Chinese: 剛毅, 1834–1900), from the Tatara clan with the courtesy name Ziliang (子良), was a Manchu politician of the late Qing dynasty. He was a member of the Manchu Bordered Blue Banner.

In 1894, Gangyi resolutely advocated war against Japan, which was appreciated by Empress Dowager Cixi. He opposed the Hundred Days' Reform movement initiated by the Guangxu Emperor and his allies. On 22 September 1898 Cixi launched a coup d'état and put Guangxu under house arrest in the Summer Palace. Gangyi sided with Cixi, he advocated to depose the emperor.

Gangyi was one of the main supporters of the Boxers. After the Boxer Rebellion of broke out, he placed in command of Boxer groups to fight against the Eight-Nation Alliance together with Zaixun, Prince Zhuang.

When Beijing fell to the Eight-Nation Alliance in 1900, he fled from Beijing and later died at Houma, Shanxi. The victorious Eight-Nation Alliance named Gangyi as one of the masterminds behind the rebellion. Gangyi was dismissed from all official positions by Qing court posthumously.

== Publications ==
- Jinzheng jiyao 晉政輯要 (1887)
