= Ministry of Rites =

Imperial Chinese government ministry

Chinese name
- Traditional Chinese: 禮部
- Simplified Chinese: 礼部
- Literal meaning: Rites Ministry
Transcriptions
Standard Mandarin
- Hanyu Pinyin: Lǐbù
- Wade–Giles: Li Pu

Vietnamese name
- Vietnamese alphabet: Lễ Bộ
- Chữ Hán: 禮部

Manchu name
- Manchu script: ᡩᠣᡵᠣᠯᠣᠨ ᡳ ᠵᡠᡵᡤᠠᠨ
- Möllendorff: dorolon i jurgan

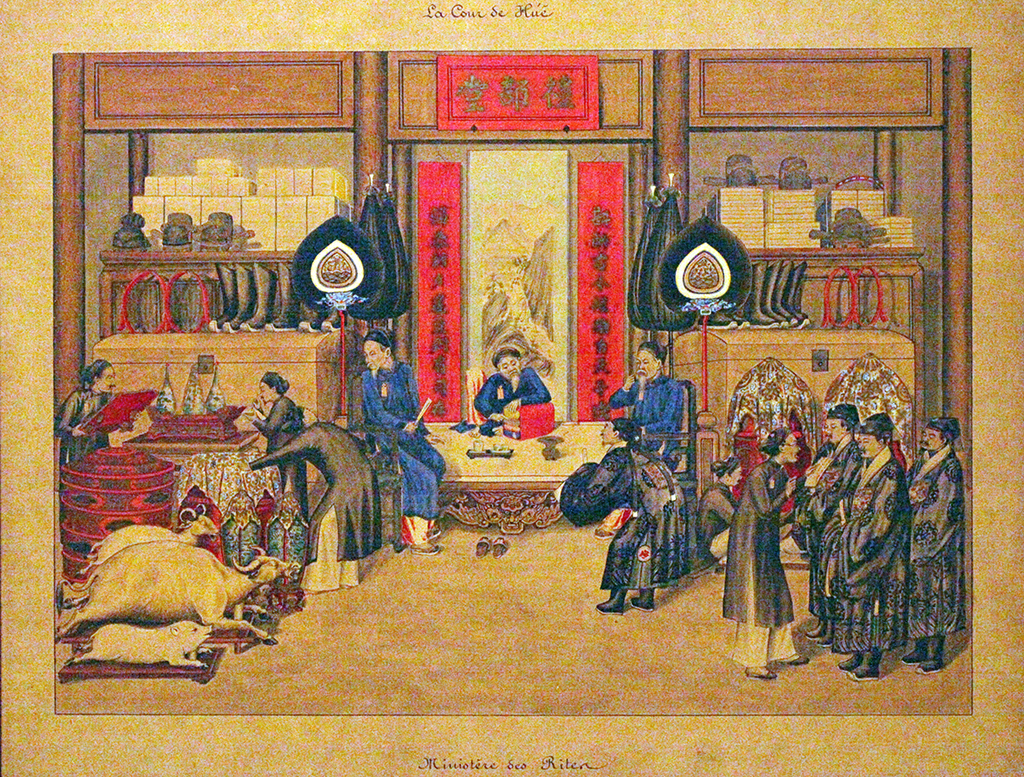
Ministry of Rites of Nguyen

The Ministry or Board of Rites was one of the Six Ministries of government in late imperial China. It was part of the imperial Chinese government from the Tang (7th century) until the 1911 Xinhai Revolution. Along with religious rituals and court ceremonial the Ministry of Rites also oversaw the imperial examination and China's foreign relations.

A Ministry of Rites also existed in imperial Vietnam. One of its tasks was enforcing the naming taboo.

== History ==
Under the Han, similar functions were performed by the Ministry of Ceremonies. In early medieval China, its functions were performed by other officials including the Grand Herald. Under the Song (10th-13th centuries), its functions were temporarily transferred to the Zhongshu Sheng. Its administration of China's foreign relations was ended by the establishment of the Zongli Yamen in 1861.

== Functions ==
- Management of imperial court ceremonies and ritual offerings.
- Registration and supervision of Buddhist and Taoist priests within China.
- Management of the Imperial examinations.
- Foreign relations.

In the Republic of China (Taiwan), the functions of this ministry are currently carried out by the following ministries and organs: Foreign Affairs, Education and the Department of Religious and Ceremonial Affairs (the last one being an organ of the Ministry of the Interior). Whereas in the People's Republic of China the functions of this ministry are currently performed by the following ministries and organs: Foreign Affairs, Education and the United Front Work Department also known as National Religious Affairs Administration (the last one being an organ of the Central Committee of the Chinese Communist Party).

== See also ==
- The Book of Rites
- Ministry of Ceremonies under the Han
- Bureau of Buddhist and Tibetan Affairs (Yuan) and Board for the Administration of Outlying Regions (Qing), overseeing Tibetan Buddhism
- Ministry of Foreign Affairs (China)
  - Office of the Commissioner (Hong Kong)
  - Office of the Commissioner (Macau)
- Ministry of Foreign Affairs (Taiwan)
- Ministry of Foreign Affairs (Vietnam)
- Ministry of Education (China)
  - Education Bureau
- Ministry of Education (Taiwan)
- Ministry of Education and Training (Vietnam)
  - Home Affairs Bureau
  - Secretariat for Social Affairs and Culture
- State Administration for Religious Affairs under the PRC State Council
- United Front Work Department
